= Super Mario =

Video game series

- Logo used since 2026
- Genre: Platform
- Developers: Nintendo EAD (1985–2015); Nintendo EPD (2016–present)
- Publisher: Nintendo
- Creator: Shigeru Miyamoto
- Artists: Yoichi Kotabe; Shigehisa Nakaue
- Composers: Koji Kondo; Mahito Yokota; Kazumi Totaka
- Platforms: Game & Watch; NES; Famicom Disk System; Arcade; Game Boy; Super NES; Nintendo 64; Game Boy Color; Game Boy Advance; GameCube; Nintendo DS; Wii; Nintendo 3DS; Wii U; iOS; Android; Nintendo Switch; Nintendo Switch 2
- First release: Super Mario Bros. September 13, 1985
- Latest release: Super Mario Bros. Wonder; October 20, 2023
- Spin-offs: Luigi; Yoshi; Wario; Mario Kart; Mario Party; Paper Mario; Mario & Luigi

Super Mario (Note: Japanese: スーパーマリオ, Hepburn: Sūpā Mario) (also known as Super Mario Bros. (Note: Japanese: スーパーマリオブラザーズ, Hepburn: Sūpā Mario Burazāzu) and simply Mario (Note: Japanese: マリオ)) is a platform game series developed and published by Nintendo and starring their mascot, Mario. The series was created by Japanese game designer Shigeru Miyamoto and is the flagship series of the greater Mario franchise. At least one Super Mario game has been released for every major Nintendo video game console. A limited number of Super Mario games have also released on non-Nintendo gaming platforms.

The Super Mario games are set primarily in the fictional Mushroom Kingdom, typically with Mario as the main player character. He is often joined by his brother, Luigi, and other members of the Mario cast. As platform games, they involve the player character running and jumping across platforms and defeating enemies in themed levels. The games have simple plots, typically with Mario and Luigi having to rescue the kidnapped Princess Peach from the primary antagonist, Bowser. The first game in the series, Super Mario Bros., released for the Nintendo Entertainment System (NES) in 1985, established the series' core gameplay concepts and elements. These include a multitude of power-ups that give the character special powers such as size-changing and fireball-throwing.

The Super Mario series, part of the greater Mario franchise, includes numerous spin-offs spanning various genres and media such as film, television, printed media, and merchandise. More than 430 million copies of Super Mario games have been sold worldwide, making it the sixth-best-selling video game series, behind the larger Mario franchise, the puzzle series Tetris, the Call of Duty series, the Pokémon video game series, and Grand Theft Auto.

== Gameplay ==
The 2D Super Mario games are known for their side-scrolling gameplay, seen here in the first level of Super Mario Bros. (1985), the series' first game.

Objectives in the Super Mario games involve progressing through levels by defeating enemies, collecting items and solving puzzles without dying. Power-up use is integral to the series. The series has installments featuring both two and three-dimensional gameplay. In the 2D games, the player character, usually Mario, jumps on platforms and enemies while avoiding their attacks and moving to the right of the scrolling screen. 2D Super Mario game levels typically have a single-exit objective that must be reached within a time limit, leading to the next sequential level. Super Mario Bros. 3 introduced the overworld, a map of nonlinear levels that branches according to the player's choice. Super Mario World introduced levels with secret exits.

3D installments in the series are split into two subgenres: open world exploration-based games and more linear 3D games with a predetermined path. Levels in the open world games, 64, Sunshine and Odyssey, allow the player to freely explore multiple enclosed environments in 360-degree movement. As the game progresses, more environments become accessible. The linear 3D games, Galaxy, Galaxy 2, 3D Land and 3D World, feature more fixed camera angles and a predetermined path to a single goal, with minor exceptions.

=== Playable characters ===
The series often features the option to play as characters other than Mario, usually Luigi. Earlier games offer an alternating multiplayer mode in which the second player controls Luigi on their turn. Luigi is often only playable by player one in a second, more challenging iteration of the base game, such as in The Lost Levels, Galaxy 2, New Super Luigi U, and the special worlds in 3D Land; these feature lower gravity and reduced friction for Luigi. Later games allow four player simultaneous play. Other playable characters include Princess Peach, Princess Daisy, Toads, Yoshi, Rosalina, and Nabbit, among others. Characters are sometimes differentiated by special abilities.

==== Power-ups and transformations ====
UGO described the Super Mushroom item as "the quintessential power-up".

Mushroom power-ups appear in almost every Super Mario game. The most iconic of these is the Super Mushroom. The power-up increases the character's size, turning them into a "Super" variant, and allows them to break certain blocks. When hit by an enemy, the character reverts to their smaller size instead of losing a life. When the character is in their "Super" form, most blocks that would contain a Super Mushroom instead offer a more powerful power-up such as the Fire Flower. The Super Mushroom is similar in appearance to the Amanita muscaria, with an ivory stalk below a most commonly red and white (originally red and orange) spotted cap. Created by chance, Shigeru Miyamoto stated in an interview that beta tests of Super Mario Bros. proved Mario too tall, so the development team implemented mushrooms to grow and shrink Mario.

Different variants of mushroom power-ups appear in the series. For example, Super Mario Bros.: The Lost Levels introduces the Poison Mushroom, which causes damage when collected; and New Super Mario Bros. introduces the Mini Mushroom, which shrinks the character to miniature size; and the Mega Mushroom, which temporarily grows the character into a towering, invulnerable giant who can destroy enemies and the environment by running through them.

Super Mario Bros. 3 introduces suits to the Super Mario series, many of which are based on animals or Mario enemies. The Raccoon Suit (provisioned by a Super Leaf) and the Tanuki Suit (turning Mario into Tanuki Mario) each provide the character with a tail that enables flight. The Tanuki Suit lets the character spontaneously change into an invincible statue for about five seconds. Super Mario Bros. 3 also introduces a Hammer Bros. suit, which allows Mario and Luigi to throw hammers as projectiles to defeat enemies at a distance. Other suits in later games in the series include the Frog Suit, Penguin Suit, Cat Suit, Boomerang Suit, and Bee Suit. Super Mario Maker includes costume power-ups that depict many more characters from various franchises (Super Mario Maker 2 includes only a Link power-up).

==== Projectiles ====
Flower power-ups let the player character shoot projectiles. The Fire Flower, introduced in Super Mario Bros., transforms the character into a Fire variant who can throw bouncing fireballs at enemies. Galaxy is the first 3D Super Mario game to have the Fire Flower, although it is a limited-time item in the game and in Galaxy 2. In Land and Maker 2, the Superball is obtained from a Super Flower and allows the player to shoot a bouncing ball, which can be used to defeat enemies and collect coins. The Ice Flower transforms the character into an Ice variant who can shoot balls of ice as projectiles similar to those of the Fire Flower; they freeze enemies in blocks of ice that can be used as platforms or thrown as projectiles, as seen in New Super Mario Bros. Wii and New Super Mario Bros. U. In its first series appearance in Galaxy, the Ice Flower turns Mario or Luigi into ice and lets him walk on lava or water for a limited time by freezing the surface. Lastly, New Super Mario Bros. 2's Gold Flower lets Mario or Luigi turn brick blocks into coins and earn bonus coins for defeating enemies.

Koopa Shells serve as a major projectile in the series, featuring since the original game. The character can throw them to defeat enemies, collect coins, and activate the functions of blocks. Power-ups are available for Yoshi to breathe fire in World, Yoshi's Island, and 64 DS, breathe freezing air and spit seeds in Yoshi's Island, spit out enemies in the World games, and spit juice in Sunshine. Other power-ups let the character throw bombs, boomerangs, and baseballs and shoot cannonballs. In Odyssey, Mario can possess characters, some of which can launch various projectiles. Flying shoot 'em up gameplay also appears in the series. Mario pilots the armed Sky Pop biplane and Marine Pop submarine in Land. The Koopa Clown Car, personal transport vehicle of Bowser and the Koopalings, has a fireball-shooting variant in Maker.

==== Ridable animals and vehicles ====
Apart from automated objects in levels that may transport the player character, certain ridable animals and vehicles have appeared that the player controls. Mario's dinosaur friend Yoshi has appeared as a mount to the player character in several Super Mario games since Super Mario World. In Yoshi's Island and 64 DS, instead of the player character merely riding on Yoshi's back, Yoshi is the player character. Yoshis generally have abilities including eating enemies, flying, shooting projectiles, and breathing fire. Miyamoto had originally wished for Mario to be able to ride a dinosaur in Super Mario Bros., but this wasn't possible due to technical limitations. Poochy is a dog featuring in Yoshi's Island who Yoshi can ride. Plesiosaurs Dorrie and Plessie can be ridden by the player characters in 64 and 3D World respectively, with Plessie serving a larger role in Bowser's Fury.

Various vehicles that the player character can control have also appeared. These include a magic carpet in 2, flying clouds in several 2D games, submarines in Land and Yoshi's Island, an airplane in Land, a helicopter, train, and mole tank in Yoshi's Island, cars in Yoshi's Island and Maker 2, and the Koopa Clown Car aircraft in the Maker games.

=== Blocks ===
Most items in the Super Mario series appear from floating item blocks when hit, which originated in Super Mario Bros. and have persisted throughout the series, where the character hits a block to receive either coins or power-ups. Variations include ones that are invisible until hit, advice dispensers, produce another block, move, frozen, contingent on a switch, bounce and more. The propeller block lets the character spin up into the air and slowly descend, and the Gold Block generates coins through running. A single block is the unit of measurement in the design of Super Mario levels.

=== Extra lives ===
Player characters can gain extra lives in most of the games. The 1-Up mushroom was introduced in Super Mario Bros., with the term 1-up subsequently being used generically in other video game series to refer to extra lives. In the monochromatic Super Mario Land and Super Mario Land 2, instead of a differently colored mushroom, the 1-Up is shown as a heart. Super Mario World introduced the 3-Up Moon, of which there are only seven in the entire game, one in each world. 1-Ups can also be earned through collecting a certain number of coins or playing minigames.

=== Invincibility ===
Invincibility is an effect first appearing in Super Mario Bros., where it is granted by a Super Star, a yellow flashing star with eyes, originally known as the "Starman" and also called the "Rainbow Star" in Super Mario Galaxy and Super Mario Galaxy 2. Picking up the star makes the character temporarily invincible, able to resist any harm. Use of the item is accompanied by a distinctive music track that appears consistently across most of the games. The player character flickers a variety of colors – and in some games, moves with increased speed and enhanced jumping ability – while under the Star's influence.

While invincible, the character can defeat almost any enemy upon contact with it. In Super Mario World 2: Yoshi's Island, the star gives the normally immobile baby Mario the ability to run along with invincibility. In Super Mario 64 and 64 DS, invincibility is provided when the character becomes metal or intangible. The Mega Mushroom provides temporary invincibility with the addition of giant size and environment destruction (see Power-ups and transformations).

=== Collectibles ===
Super Mario level design traditionally incorporates distributed yellow coins as puzzles, rewards, and guidance through the level. Coins are often found floating in the air in groups. Most Super Mario games award the player an extra life once a certain amount of coins are collected, commonly 50 or 100. Several coin variants exist, such as blue coins, red coins, silver coins, dragon coins, star coins, and more. In 64, Sunshine, Galaxy, and Galaxy 2, coins replenish health, and air, when the character is underwater.

In 64 and Sunshine, collecting 100 coins in a level results in a Power Star or Shine Sprite respectively. There are also stages in 64 that reward a Power Star for collecting eight red coins in a level, worth two normal coins each. In 64, a blue coin is worth five normal coins. In Sunshine, blue coins act as a side quest when brought to the Delfino Bank and for every ten blue coins deposited, Mario will earn a Shine Sprite. In the Galaxy series, after finishing each game once, missions unlock where Mario or Luigi have to collect 100 purple coins to earn a Power Star. In Galaxy 2, they can also be used to feed "Hungry Luma" characters that can turn into either an item or another planet/level.

The games often feature other collectibles found in levels to progress in the overworld, most frequently with the visual motif of a star. They are typically situated in locations that are not readily found or reached, awarded for completing stunts, or are objectives given by NPCs. They include the Power Stars in Super Mario 64 and the Super Mario Galaxy games, Shine Sprites in Super Mario Sunshine, Cat Shines in Bowser's Fury, Star Coins in the New Super Mario Bros. series, Star Medals in Super Mario 3D Land, Green Stars in the Galaxy games and Super Mario 3D World, and Power Moons in Super Mario Odyssey. In Super Mario Land 2, there are six Golden Coin collectibles that must be collected to unlock Wario's castle and battle Wario.

=== Warp Pipes and Warp Cannons ===
The Warp Pipe is a common method of transportation used in many of the Mario series games. Warp Pipes are most often green but also appear in other colors (early games included silver pipes, later games introduced red, blue and yellow pipes), and have many uses in the series. Warp Pipes can contain enemies, usually Piranha Plants, and sometimes launch the player into the air, most commonly seen in the New Super Mario Bros. series. In early Mario games such as Super Mario Bros., special, well-hidden areas known as Warp Zones contain pipes that allow players to skip several worlds at once.

In the New Super Mario Bros. series, pipe-shaped Warp Cannons work similarly to the Warp Zones of the earlier games and are unlocked by finding secret exits in levels. Cannons appear in most of the 3D games in the series starting with Super Mario 64. The character uses the cannon by jumping into the barrel, aiming themself and firing at a distant target. This allows the character to progress through a level or reach otherwise inaccessible areas.

=== Music ===
Much of the original Super Mario Bros. music and sound effects have become iconic and are oftentimes incorporated into modern games. The original Super Mario Bros. theme, composed by Koji Kondo, has become one of the most well-known video game themes around the world.

Super Mario Galaxy, released in 2007, became the first game in the Super Mario series to feature orchestrated music, which would return in its sequel and other subsequent games such as Super Mario 3D World.

== History and development ==
Release timeline
1985	Super Mario Bros.
1986	Super Mario Bros.: The Lost Levels
1986	(Super Mario Bros. Special)
1987
1988	Super Mario Bros. 2
1988	Super Mario Bros. 3
1989	Super Mario Land
1990	Super Mario World
1991
1992	Super Mario Land 2: 6 Golden Coins
1993
1994	(Wario Land: Super Mario Land 3)
1995	(Super Mario World 2: Yoshi's Island)
1996	Super Mario 64
1997
1998
1999
2000
2001
2002	Super Mario Sunshine
2003
2004
2005
2006	New Super Mario Bros.
2007	Super Mario Galaxy
2008
2009	New Super Mario Bros. Wii
2010	Super Mario Galaxy 2
2011	Super Mario 3D Land
2012	New Super Mario Bros. 2
2012	New Super Mario Bros. U
2013	(New Super Luigi U)
2013	Super Mario 3D World
2014
2015	Super Mario Maker
2016	Super Mario Run
2017	Super Mario Odyssey
2018
2019	Super Mario Maker 2
2020
2021	Bowser's Fury
2022
2023	Super Mario Bros. Wonder

=== 1980–1989: Conception and Super Mario Bros. games ===
In 1980, Nintendo released Radar Scope, their first arcade video game, which was a commercial failure. Nintendo president Hiroshi Yamauchi appointed Shigeru Miyamoto to repurpose unused Radar Scope arcade cabinets into a new game. While Miyamoto wanted the game to star Popeye characters, negotiations between Nintendo and Popeye owner King Features fell through, and the game required reworking. Three new characters were created for the game instead: Jumpman, Lady, and Donkey Kong. Titled Donkey Kong, the game was released in arcades in 1981. Lady was later renamed to Pauline, and Jumpman was renamed to Mario. Miyamoto created Mario's brother Luigi using palette swap of Mario's sprite. Mario and Luigi starred together in the 1983 arcade game Mario Bros. The gameplay of Donkey Kong and Mario Bros., centered around the act of jumping to dodge obstacles, caused the games to be considered landmark titles in the platformer genre of games.

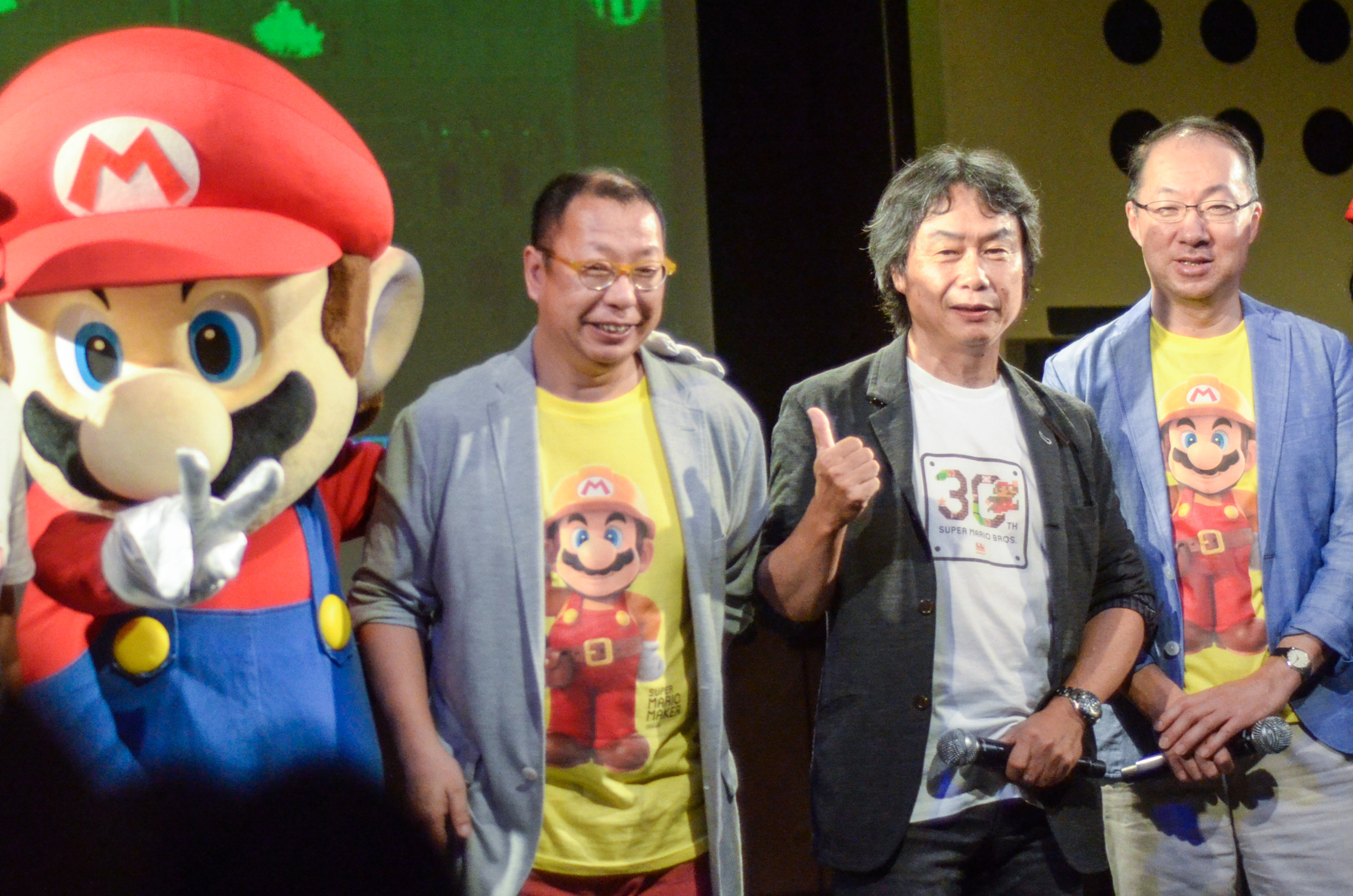
Development of Super Mario Bros. was led by Shigeru Miyamoto (center) and Takashi Tezuka (left), while Koji Kondo (right) served as composer.

Following a 1983 crash in the video game market, Nintendo released the Famicom / Nintendo Entertainment System (NES) in Japan in July 1983, and the console released outside of Japan in 1985. Yamauchi granted Miyamoto his own development team, Nintendo R&D4 (later Nintendo EAD), which aimed to develop games for the console before its introduction in North America. Prototyping for a new Mario game began in December 1984, directed by Miyamoto and programmed by SRD. Led by Miyamoto and Takashi Tezuka, Super Mario Bros. was released on September 13, 1985, for the NES. The game's soundtrack was composed by Koji Kondo. Credited with helping to revive the video game industry following the crash of 1983 and largely contributing to the success of the NES in North America, Super Mario Bros. went on to sell over forty million units, making it one of the best-selling games of all time.

After Super Mario Bros. released, development began for a sequel to be released on the Famicom Disk System. In 1986, Super Mario Bros. 2 released in Japan. Super Mario Bros. 2 reused many assets from the first game, but was much more difficult, with some levels being taken from Vs. Super Mario Bros., an arcade adaptation of the first game. Fearing that the game would be too difficult for Western audiences, the game did not release outside of Japan. Instead, Nintendo chose to adapt Yume Kōjō: Doki Doki Panic, replacing its characters with Mario characters. Doki Doki Panic was created out of a prototype for a vertically scrolling two-player cooperative game. It later introduced more side-scrolling elements to make it more like Super Mario Bros., however it starred characters from the Yume Kōjō expo as a tie-in. The version of Doki Doki Panic adapted with Mario characters was released outside of Japan in October 1988 as Super Mario Bros. 2, directed by Kensuke Tanabe. The version of Super Mario Bros. 2 released outside of Japan was later released in Japan as Super Mario USA, and the version released in Japan was later released internationally as Super Mario Bros.: The Lost Levels. The next game, Super Mario Bros. 3, was directed and designed by Miyamoto and Tezuka, while Kondo returned as composer. Released in Japan 1988 and in the United States two years later, the game was a critical and commercial success.

=== 1989–1995: 2D sequels ===
Super Mario Land is the first handheld Super Mario game apart from the Game & Watch conversion of Super Mario Bros., and was released for the Game Boy in 1989. Like the Super Mario Bros. games, it is a sidescrolling platformer. Mario sets out to save Princess Daisy from the spaceman Tatanga. Items include the Super Mushroom, Super Flower, which allows Mario to shoot projectiles, Super Star, and hearts, which give Mario an extra life. The game consists of twelve levels split across four worlds. Reaching the higher of two exits at each level's end activates a minigame where the player can try to get extra lives.

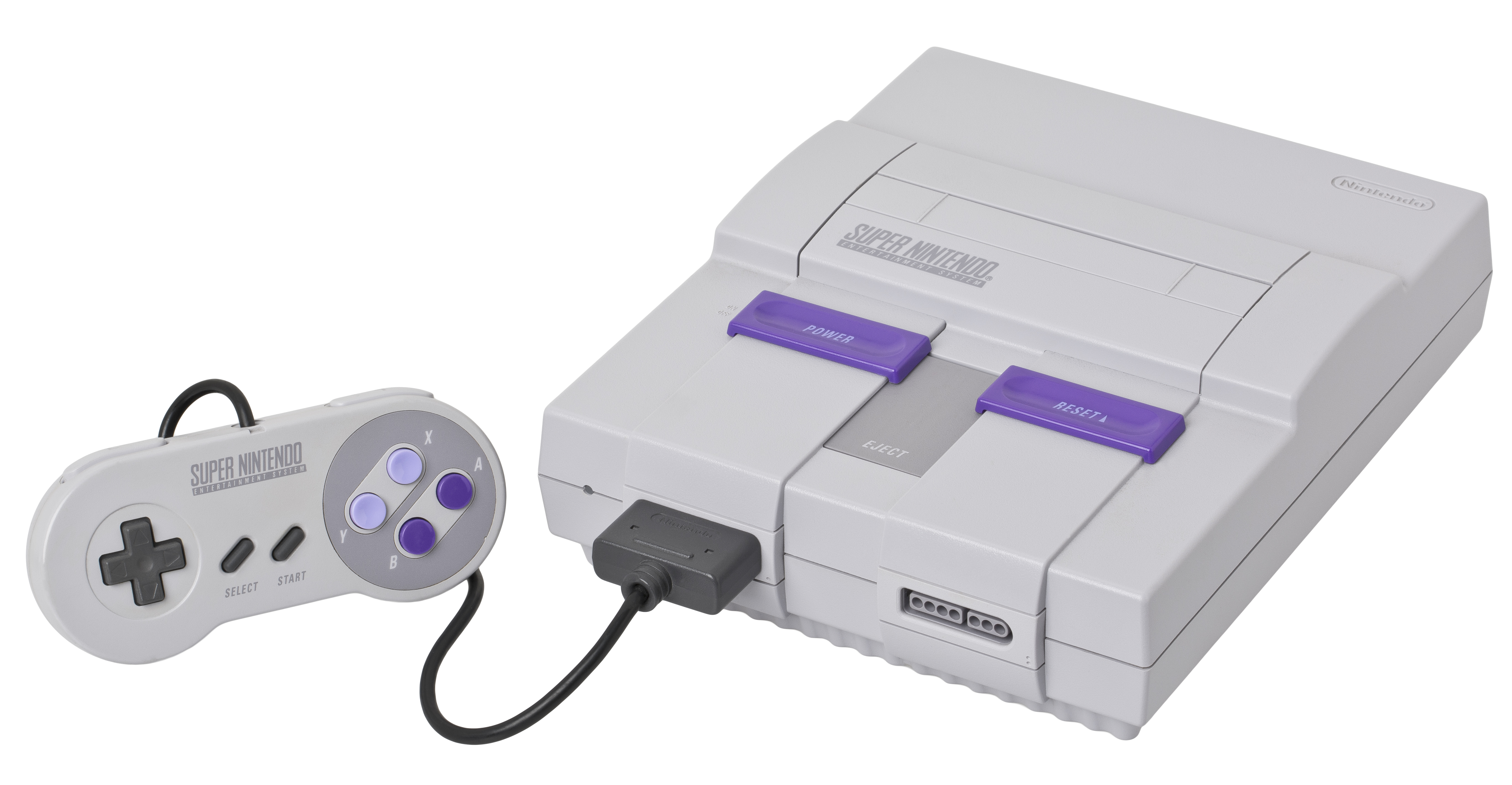
Super Mario World is the bestselling game for the Super Nintendo Entertainment System.

Super Mario World was released for the Super Nintendo Entertainment System and consists of nine worlds displayed via a world map. It is a direct successor to the Super Mario Bros. games, bearing the subtitle Super Mario Bros. 4 in Japan. Unlike Super Mario Bros. 3, however, where each world map is separate, the world map here covers the whole game. Some of the levels have hidden alternate exits leading to different areas. New abilities include a spin jump and the rideable Yoshi, who can eat enemies and either swallow or spit them out. Power-ups include the new Cape Feather, which lets Mario and Luigi fly with a cape, and the P-balloon, which inflates the player character to allow him to float.

Super Mario Land 2: 6 Golden Coins was released for the Game Boy in 1992. It introduces Mario's rival, Wario, who took over Mario's castle during the events of Super Mario Land and forces Mario to collect the six golden coins to reenter and reclaim his castle. While its predecessor is similar to the original Super Mario Bros., Super Mario Land 2 has more in common with Super Mario World, featuring a world map and the ability to move back to the left within levels. There are 32 levels, divided into several themed worlds that each have their own boss. Three power-ups return: the Super Mushroom, Fire Flower, and Super Star. The game also introduces the Carrot power-up, which gives Mario large rabbit ears that let him glide when falling for a limited time. Its story was continued in Wario Land: Super Mario Land 3, which retroactively became the first of a spin-off series, Wario Land.

Super Mario World 2: Yoshi's Island was released for the SNES in 1995. To reunite baby Mario with his brother Luigi, who has been kidnapped by Kamek, the player controls Yoshi as the primary character through 48 levels while carrying Baby Mario. Yoshi runs and jumps to reach the end of the level while solving puzzles and collecting items. In a style new to the series, the game has a hand-drawn aesthetic. The game introduces his signature abilities to flutter jump and produce eggs from swallowed enemies. Yoshi's Island received "instant" and "universal acclaim", according to IGN and review aggregator Metacritic, and sold over four million copies. Yoshi's signature characteristics established in Yoshi's Island would carry throughout a series of cameos, spin-offs, and sequels. Sources have debated on whether Super Mario World 2: Yoshi's Island, where the player primarily controls a Yoshi carrying Baby Mario, should count as a Super Mario game, with some sources considering it strictly a Yoshi game. Miyamoto responded affirmatively when asked if Yoshi's Island is a Super Mario game, with Tezuka later adding:

"When that game debuted, I wanted people to understand that Yoshi was part of the Mario world, and that be conveyed whether through title or gameplay. To me, it's part of the Mario series, but today's Yoshi games? They've changed from those origins, so I think it's okay to think of Yoshi living in his own universe. You can think of it separately from Mario's world."

=== 1996–2005: Introduction of 3D and open-ended exploration ===
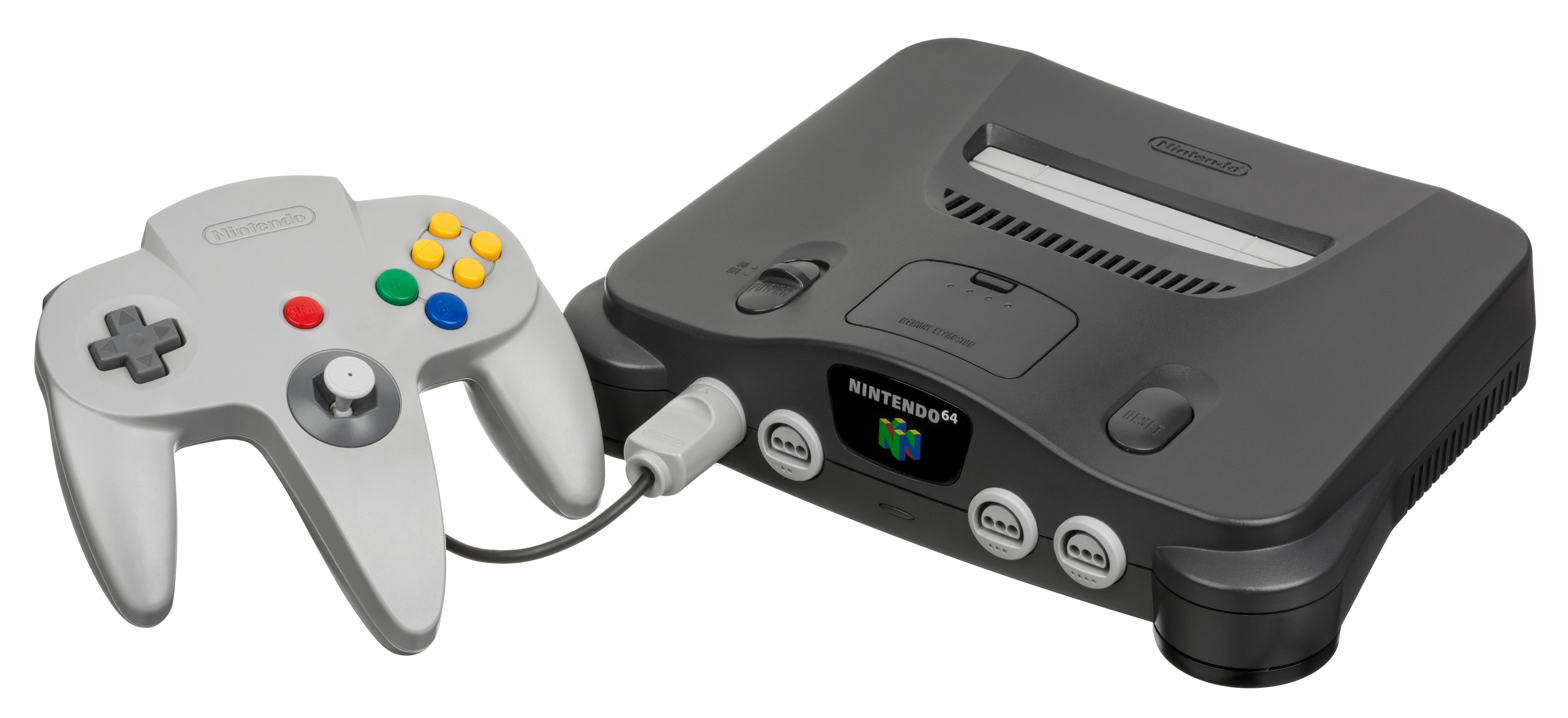
Super Mario 64 for the Nintendo 64 (pictured) is the first 3D and open world entry.

In the early 1990s, director and producer Shigeru Miyamoto had conceived a 3D Mario design during development of the Super Nintendo Entertainment System (SNES) game Star Fox (1993). He considered using the Super FX chip to develop a SNES game, Super Mario FX, with gameplay based on "an entire world in miniature, like miniature trains". He eventually reformulated the idea for the Nintendo 64, not for its substantially greater power, but because its controller has more buttons for gameplay. Super Mario 64 was developed over approximately three years, with one year spent on the design concept and approximately two years on production. Production began on September 7, 1994, and concluded on May 20, 1996. Super Mario 64 is the first 3D and open world game in the series, and a launch game for the Nintendo 64 home console. Each level is an enclosed environment where the player is free to explore in all directions without time limits. The player collects the scattered Power Stars from the paintings in Peach's castle to unlock later courses and areas. The Nintendo 64's analog stick makes an extensive repertoire of precise movements in all directions possible. The game's power-ups differ from previous games, now being three different hats with temporary powers: the Wing Cap, allowing Mario to fly; the Metal Cap, turning him into metal; and the Vanish Cap, allowing him to walk through obstacles. Super Mario 64 is considered seminal to 3D video games. It is the first Super Mario series game to feature Charles Martinet's voice acting for Mario. A remake of the game called Super Mario 64 DS was released for Nintendo DS in 2004 and 2005, adding new playable characters, abilities, objectives, multiplayer, and minigames.

Super Mario Sunshine is the second 3D Super Mario game. It was released in 2002 for the GameCube. In it, Mario and Peach travel to Isle Delfino for a vacation when a Mario doppelgänger, going by the name of Shadow Mario, appears and vandalizes the entire island. Mario is sentenced to clean the island with a water-squirting accessory called F.L.U.D.D. Super Mario Sunshine shares many similar gameplay elements with its predecessor Super Mario 64, yet introduces moves, like spinning while jumping, and several other actions through the use of F.L.U.D.D. The game contains a number of independent levels, which can be reached from the hub, Delfino Plaza. Mario collects Shine Sprites by completing tasks in the levels, which in return unlock levels in Delfino Plaza by way of abilities and plot-related events. Sunshine introduces Bowser's son, Bowser Jr., as an antagonist. Yoshi also appears again for Mario to ride in certain sections.

=== 2006–2016: 2D revival and path-focused 3D games ===
New Super Mario Bros. series logo

After no original 2D game releases in the series since 1995, New Super Mario Bros. was released on the Nintendo DS in 2006. In it, Mario and Luigi set out to save Princess Peach from Bowser Jr. The gameplay is 2D, but most of the characters and objects are 3D on two-dimensional backgrounds, resulting in a 2.5D effect. The game uses an overworld map similar to those of Super Mario Bros. Deluxe. Some levels have multiple exits. The classic power-ups (Super Mushroom, Fire Flower and Super Star) return alongside the Mega Mushroom, Blue Shell, and Mini Mushroom.

Miyamoto explained that when he was developing Super Mario 64 with Yoshiaki Koizumi, they realized that the title would be more directed towards the "core gamer", rather than the casual, "pick-up-and-go" gamer. After Sunshine, their focus shifted to more accessible, casual games, leading them to develop Super Mario Galaxy with more progression-oriented paths. Galaxy was launched in 2007 for the Wii. It is set in outer space, where Mario or Luigi travel between "galaxies" to collect Power Stars, earned by completing quests or defeating enemies. It introduced motion controls to the series. Each galaxy contains a number of planets and other space objects for the player to explore. The game's physics system gives each celestial object its own gravitational force, which lets the character circumnavigate rounded or irregular planetoids by walking sideways or upside down. The character is usually able to jump from one independent object and fall towards another close object. Though the main gameplay and physics are in 3D, there are several points in the game where the character's movements are restricted into a 2D axis. Several new power-ups appear following the new game mechanics.

New Super Mario Bros. Wii, released in 2009, features 4-player co-op and new power-ups: the Propeller Mushroom, the Ice Flower, and the Penguin Suit. All characters can ride Yoshi.

Super Mario Galaxy 2, released in 2010, was initially developed as an expansion pack to Galaxy, but was eventually developed into its own game. It retains the basic premise of its predecessor and includes its items and power-ups besides the Ice Flower and Red Star. New power-ups include the Cloud Flower, which allows Mario or Luigi to create platforms in mid-air and the Rock Mushroom, which turns the character into a rolling boulder. The character can also ride Yoshi. The game was released to widespread critical acclaim, getting better reviews than its predecessor.

Super Mario 3D Land was released for the Nintendo 3DS in November and December 2011. It was the first attempt to translate the gameplay of the 2D games into a 3D environment, and simplify the control scheme of the 3D games through including more linear levels. It is the first original 3D Super Mario game on a handheld console, since all previous handheld games were either 2D or a port of a previous game. It also brought back several older gameplay features, including the Super Leaf power-up last seen in Super Mario Bros. 3.

New Super Mario Bros. 2 was released in Summer 2012 for the Nintendo 3DS. Mario and Luigi must once again save Princess Peach from Bowser and the Koopalings, with the game's secondary goal to collect as many coins as possible. Several gameplay elements were introduced to help achieve this goal, such as the Gold Flower, a rarer variant of the Fire Flower that turns items into coins.

New Super Mario Bros. U, the Wii U follow-up to New Super Mario Bros. Wii, was released in November 2012. It introduces both a Flying Squirrel suit that lets the characters glide through the air, and asymmetric gameplay that allows the player holding the GamePad to influence the environment. In June 2013, New Super Luigi U was released as a downloadable content (DLC) package for the game, featuring shorter, but more difficult levels, starring Luigi as the main protagonist instead of his brother. Subsequently, it was released as a standalone retail game on August 25 in North America. The Nintendo Switch port New Super Mario Bros. U Deluxe includes both the main game and New Super Luigi U, and new playable characters Nabbit and Toadette.

Super Mario 3D World, the sequel to 3D Land, was released for the Wii U on November 22, 2013, in North America, and used the same gameplay mechanics as its predecessor. Co-operative multiplayer is available for up to four players. The game introduced the ability to turn the characters into cats able to attack and scale walls to reach new areas, and to create clones of the characters. Like Super Mario Bros. 2, it features Princess Peach and Toad as playable characters in addition to Mario and Luigi. Rosalina from Super Mario Galaxy is also unlocked later in the game. Miyamoto said that "even though that's a 3D game, it's a little more accessible to everybody."

Super Mario Maker series logo

Super Mario Maker is a creation tool released for the Wii U in September 2015 which allows players to create their own levels based on the gameplay and style of Super Mario Bros., Super Mario Bros. 3, Super Mario World, and New Super Mario Bros. U, as well as to share their creations online. Based on existing games, several gameplay mechanics were introduced for the game, with existing ones also available to be used together in new ways. A Nintendo 3DS version of the game called Super Mario Maker for Nintendo 3DS, was released in December 2016. It features a few new pre-installed levels, but no online level sharing. Super Mario Maker 2 is a newer version of Super Mario Maker with many new items, themes, and enemies, a world-builder, as well as online multiplayer. The game was released on June 28, 2019, for the Nintendo Switch.

Super Mario Run is a side-scrolling and auto-scrolling video game released in December 2016 on the iOS platform, then in March 2017 on Android. It is the first official Super Mario game developed for mobile devices. As such, it features simplified controls that allow it to be played with only one hand. In this game, the character runs automatically, with the player controlling the jumping action to avoid hazards. This is achieved by touching the tactile screens these devices are built with. The longer the player touches the jump button, the higher the character jumps. This game also includes a "Toad Rally" mode, similar to the "VS Boo" mode of Super Mario Bros Deluxe, in which players have to complete a level faster than a computer-controlled Toad. Success in this mode earns the player access to in-game money to spend on customizing the Mushroom Kingdom map, using mechanics similar to FarmVille. This is the first Super Mario game that Princess Daisy is playable in and the first to feature a music track with vocals.

=== 2017–present: Return to open-ended exploration ===
After having fallen out of favor by the mid-2000s, open-world "collectathon" 3D platformers such as Super Mario 64 had become less common. By the mid-2010s, however, 3D platformers were aiming to replicate such experiences, including Yooka-Laylee and A Hat in Time. Likewise, Super Mario Odyssey is a return to the open-world "sandbox" 3D style of gameplay, with "more open-ended exploration like in Super Mario 64 and Super Mario Sunshine." Mario must save Peach from a forced marriage with Bowser. It was released in October 2017 for Nintendo Switch.

Bowser's Fury is part of the 2021 re-release of Super Mario 3D World on the Nintendo Switch. It implements 3D open-world "free-roaming" gameplay in a similar fashion to Odyssey, from which it includes many elements.

Super Mario Bros. Wonder is a 2D sidescrolling Super Mario game released in 2023. Players can explore most levels and worlds in any order they want. New power-ups include a fruit that transforms the player into an elephant and a flower that allows the player to create bubbles that capture enemies. When touching a Wonder Flower, the player character experiences strange effects that involve the character and the world being altered. It is the first game to feature Kevin Afghani as the new voice of Mario and Luigi, following the announcement of previous actor Charles Martinet's departure from the roles in August 2023.

== Remakes and remasters ==
Game	System	Year	Original game(s)	Original release year(s)
Super Mario All-Stars (+ Super Mario World)	Super NES	1993/1994	Super Mario Bros.	1985
Super Mario All-Stars (+ Super Mario World)	Super NES	1993/1994	Super Mario Bros.: The Lost Levels	1986
Super Mario All-Stars (+ Super Mario World)	Super NES	1993/1994	Super Mario Bros. 2	1988
Super Mario All-Stars (+ Super Mario World)	Super NES	1993/1994	Super Mario Bros. 3	1988/1990
Super Mario All-Stars (+ Super Mario World)	Super NES	1993/1994	Super Mario World (Note: Not included in original version of All-Stars)	1990/1991
Super Mario Bros. Deluxe	Game Boy Color	1999	Super Mario Bros.	1985
Super Mario Bros. Deluxe	Game Boy Color	1999	Super Mario Bros.: The Lost Levels	1986
Super Mario Advance	Game Boy Advance	2001	Super Mario Bros. 2	1988
Super Mario Advance	Game Boy Advance	2001	Mario Bros.	1983
Super Mario World: Super Mario Advance 2	Game Boy Advance	2001/2002	Super Mario World	1990/1991
Super Mario World: Super Mario Advance 2	Game Boy Advance	2001/2002	Mario Bros.	1983
Yoshi's Island: Super Mario Advance 3	Game Boy Advance	2002	Super Mario World 2: Yoshi's Island	1995
Yoshi's Island: Super Mario Advance 3	Game Boy Advance	2002	Mario Bros.	1983
Super Mario Advance 4: Super Mario Bros. 3	Game Boy Advance	2003	Super Mario Bros. 3	1988/1990
Super Mario Advance 4: Super Mario Bros. 3	Game Boy Advance	2003	Mario Bros.	1983
Super Mario 64 DS	Nintendo DS	2004/2005	Super Mario 64	1996
New Super Mario Bros. U Deluxe	Nintendo Switch	2019	New Super Mario Bros. U	2012
New Super Mario Bros. U Deluxe	Nintendo Switch	2019	New Super Luigi U	2013
Super Mario 3D All-Stars	Nintendo Switch	2020	Super Mario 64	1996
Super Mario 3D All-Stars	Nintendo Switch	2020	Super Mario Sunshine	2002
Super Mario 3D All-Stars	Nintendo Switch	2020	Super Mario Galaxy	2007
Super Mario 3D World + Bowser's Fury	Nintendo Switch	2021	Super Mario 3D World	2013
Super Mario Galaxy + Super Mario Galaxy 2	Nintendo Switch	2025	Super Mario Galaxy	2007
Super Mario Galaxy + Super Mario Galaxy 2	Nintendo Switch	2025	Super Mario Galaxy 2	2010
Super Mario Bros. Wonder: Nintendo Switch 2 Edition + Meetup in Bellabel Park	Nintendo Switch 2	2026	Super Mario Bros. Wonder	2023

== Reception ==
Sales and aggregate review scores As of November 8, 2025.
Game	Year	Units sold (in millions)	GameRankings	Metacritic (out of 100)	OpenCritic
Super Mario Bros.	1985	NES: 40.23; SNES: 10.55; GBA: –	NES: 86% GBC: 92% GBA: 80%	NES: – GBC: – GBA: 84	–
Super Mario Bros. 2	1988	NES: 7.46; GBA: 5.57	NES: 81% GBA: 82%	NES: – GBA: 84	–
Super Mario Bros. 3	1988	NES: 17.28; GBA: 5.43	NES: 97% GBA: 92%	NES: – GBA: 94	–
Super Mario Land	1989	18.14	77%	–	–
Super Mario World	1990	SNES: 20.61; GBA: 5.69	SNES: 94% GBA: 92%	SNES: – GBA: 92	–
Super Mario Land 2: 6 Golden Coins	1992	11.18	79%	–	–
Super Mario World 2: Yoshi's Island	1995	SNES: – GBA: –	SNES: – GBA: –	SNES: – GBA: 91	–
Super Mario All-Stars	1993	10.55	90%	–	–
Super Mario 64	1996	N64: 11.91; DS: 11.06	N64: 96% DS: 86%	N64: 94; DS: 85	–
Super Mario Sunshine	2002	6.28	91%	92	–
New Super Mario Bros.	2006	30.80	89%	89	–
Super Mario Galaxy	2007	12.80	97%	97	–
New Super Mario Bros. Wii	2009	30.32	88%	87	–
Super Mario Galaxy 2	2010	7.41	97%	97	–
Super Mario 3D Land	2011	12.84	90%	90	–
New Super Mario Bros. 2	2012	13.39	78%	78	–
New Super Mario Bros. U	2012	Wii U: 5.82; NS: 12.72	Wii U: 84% NS: 81%	Wii U: 84; NS: 81	–
Super Mario 3D World	2013	Wii U: 5.89; NS: 8.85	Wii U: 92% NS: –	Wii U: 93; NS: 89	Wii U: 96% recommend NS: 95% recommend
Super Mario Maker	2015	Wii U: 4.02; 3DS: 3.79	Wii U: 89%; 3DS: 72%	Wii U: 88; 3DS: 73	Wii U: 94% recommend 3DS: 38% recommend
Super Mario Run	2016	—	—	76	—
Super Mario Odyssey	2017	30.50	97%	97	98% recommend
Super Mario Maker 2	2019	8.42	—	88	96% recommend
Super Mario 3D All-Stars	2020	9.07	—	82	86% recommend
Super Mario Bros. Wonder	2023	17.15	—	92	98% recommend

The Super Mario series has seen tremendous critical acclaim from both critics and audiences. The series was ranked as the best game franchise by IGN in 2006. In 1996 Next Generation ranked the series as number 5 on their "Top 100 Games of All Time", (Note: The entry name is "Mario (series)", but the description as a "side-scrolling platformer" makes it clear that Next Generation meant the Super Mario series specifically.) additionally ranking Super Mario 64 at number 1 although stating the rule that series of games be confined to a single entry.

In 1999, Next Generation listed the Mario series as number 3 on their "Top 50 Games of All Time", commenting that, "The depth of the game design was never matched in 2D and has yet to be equaled by a 3D action performer. The gameplay is simply genius – Shigeru Miyamoto wrote the book on platformers." Electronic Gaming Monthly attributed the series' excellence to the developers' tireless creativity and innovation, pointing out that "Sega's Sonic the Hedgehog series changed very little in its four installments on the Genesis. The Mario series has changed significantly with each new game."

The original Super Mario Bros. was awarded the top spot on Electronic Gaming Monthly's greatest 200 games of their time list and IGN's top 100 games of all-time list twice (in 2005 and 2007). Super Mario Bros. popularized side-scrolling video games and provided the basic concept and mechanics that persisted throughout the rest of the series. Super Mario Bros. sold 40.24 million copies, making it the bestselling video game of the whole series.

Various other video games of the series were ranked as the best within the series. Games included are Super Mario Bros. 3, Super Mario World and Super Mario 64 to name a few. Before Super Mario Odyssey, Super Mario Galaxy has been for 10 years the best-ranked game on GameRankings.

=== Sales ===
Super Mario is the best-selling video game franchise of all time, having sold more than 430 million units worldwide as of 2023. The first seven Super Mario games (including the first three Super Mario Bros. titles, the first two Super Mario Land titles, and Super Mario World) had sold 100 million units by March 1993.

Games in the Super Mario series have had consistently strong sales, ranking among the best-selling video games of all time. Super Mario Bros. sold more than 50 million units worldwide sold across multiple platforms by 1996. The original NES version sold 40.23 million units and is the best-selling NES game, with its two sequels, Super Mario Bros. 3 (18 million copies) and Super Mario Bros. 2 (10 million copies), ranking in second and third place respectively.

Super Mario World is the best-selling game for the SNES console, selling 20 million copies. Super Mario 64 sold the most copies for the Nintendo 64 (11 million), whereas Super Mario Sunshine is the second bestselling game (5.5 million) on the GameCube (second to Super Smash Bros. Melee). Super Mario Galaxy has sold 12.80 million units as of March 2020, which was the bestselling 3D game in the series until 2019, and is the ninth bestselling game for the Wii.

Its sequel Super Mario Galaxy 2 has 7.41 million units sold, placing in twelfth. New Super Mario Bros. Wii has sold 30.32 million copies worldwide, the fourth bestselling game on the Wii, as well as one of the bestselling video games of all time. Super Mario 3D World was the second bestselling game on the Wii U and along with its more popular Switch port has sold over 19 million copies combined making it the 2nd bestselling 3D Mario game. Super Mario Odyssey has 29.28 million units sold as of March 2025, making it the bestselling 3D game in the series to date, and among the best-selling games for the Nintendo Switch.

The Super Mario series also sold well on handheld consoles. Super Mario Land has sold 18.14 million copies, and is the fourth bestselling game for the Game Boy. Its sequel, Super Mario Land 2: 6 Golden Coins, sold 11.18 million copies, placing sixth. New Super Mario Bros. for the Nintendo DS sold 30.80 million units, making it the bestselling game for the console, and the bestselling portable entry.

For all console and handheld games that have not been bundled with a console, Super Mario Bros. 3 is the fourth bestselling game, whereas New Super Mario Bros. is fifth, Super Mario Land is eleventh, and Super Mario 64 is eighteenth.

In the United Kingdom, the Mario franchise is the most famous video game franchise, recognized by 91% of the UK adult population as of 2021.

== See also ==
- Luigi's Mansion series, a spin-off of the series
- Captain Toad: Treasure Tracker, a spin-off of the series
- Donkey Kong Country series a similar platform series
- Super Princess Peach, a spin-off Nintendo platform game that role reverses Mario and Peach
- Wario Land series, a spin-off platform sub-series
- Yoshi series, a spin-off of the series
