= List of best-selling Nintendo 3DS video games =

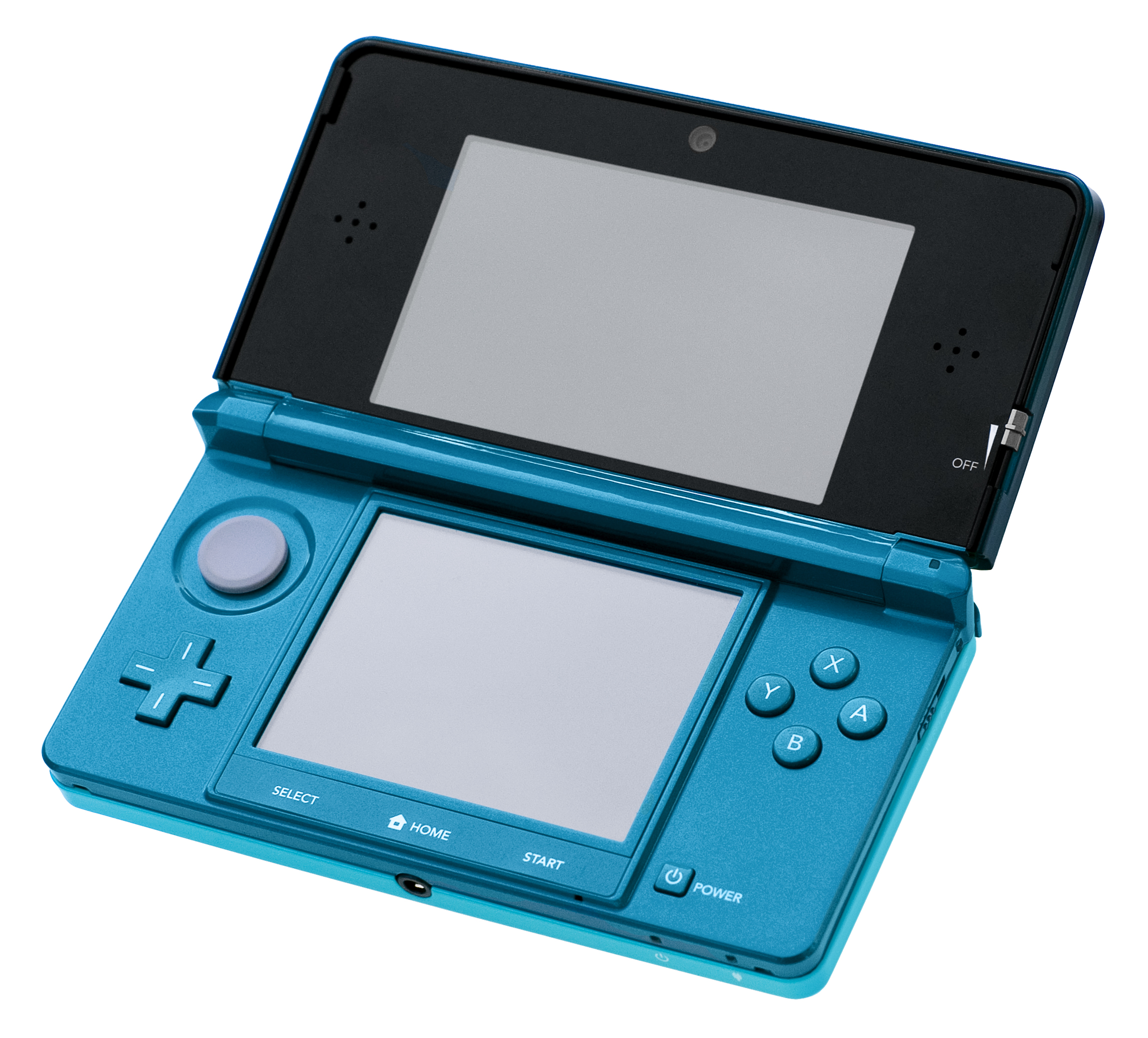
Nintendo 3DS

This is a list of video games for the Nintendo 3DS video game console that have sold or shipped at least one million copies. The best-selling game on the Nintendo 3DS is Mario Kart 7. First released in Japan on December 1, 2011, it went on to sell 18.99 million units worldwide.

There are a total of 59 Nintendo 3DS games on this list that are confirmed to have sold or shipped at least one million units. Of these, ten were developed by internal Nintendo development divisions. Of the 59 games on this list, 50 were published in one or more regions by Nintendo.

As of December 31, 2025, over 392.29 million total copies of games had been sold for the Nintendo 3DS.

== List ==
Key
†	Game was bundled with Nintendo 2DS or 3DS consoles during its lifetime

Game	Copies sold	As of	Release date (Note: Only the initial release date on this platform is listed.)	Genre(s)	Developer(s)	Publisher(s)
Mario Kart 7 †	18.99 million	March 31, 2025	December 1, 2011	Racing	Nintendo EAD; Retro Studios	Nintendo
Pokémon X and Y †	16.80 million	March 31, 2025	October 12, 2013	Role-playing	Game Freak	The Pokémon Company; Nintendo
Pokémon Sun and Moon †	16.34 million	March 31, 2025	November 18, 2016	Role-playing	Game Freak	The Pokémon Company; Nintendo
Pokémon Omega Ruby and Alpha Sapphire †	14.68 million	March 31, 2025	November 21, 2014	Role-playing	Game Freak	The Pokémon Company; Nintendo
New Super Mario Bros. 2 †	13.42 million	March 31, 2025	July 28, 2012	Platform	Nintendo EAD	Nintendo
Animal Crossing: New Leaf †	13.07 million	March 31, 2025	November 8, 2012	Life simulation	Nintendo EAD	Nintendo
Super Mario 3D Land †	12.89 million	March 31, 2025	November 3, 2011	Platform	Nintendo EAD	Nintendo
Super Smash Bros. for Nintendo 3DS	9.65 million	March 31, 2025	September 13, 2014	Fighting	Bandai Namco Studios; Sora Ltd.	Nintendo
Pokémon Ultra Sun and Ultra Moon	9.26 million	March 31, 2025	November 17, 2017	Role-playing	Game Freak	The Pokémon Company; Nintendo
Yo-kai Watch 2	7.30 million	December 31, 2022	December 13, 2014	Role-playing	Level-5	JP: Level-5; WW: Nintendo
Tomodachi Life †	6.73 million	March 31, 2025	April 18, 2013	Life simulation	Nintendo SPD	Nintendo
Luigi's Mansion: Dark Moon	6.48 million	December 31, 2022	March 20, 2013	Action-adventure	Next Level Games	Nintendo
The Legend of Zelda: Ocarina of Time 3D †	6.44 million	December 31, 2022	June 16, 2011	Action-adventure	Grezzo	Nintendo
Nintendogs + Cats	4.69 million	December 31, 2022	February 26, 2011	Pet-raising simulation	Nintendo EAD	Nintendo
Monster Hunter Generations	4.30 million	December 31, 2019	November 28, 2015	Action role-playing	Capcom	Capcom
The Legend of Zelda: A Link Between Worlds †	4.26 million	December 31, 2022	November 22, 2013	Action-adventure	Nintendo EAD	Nintendo
Monster Hunter 4 Ultimate †	4.20 million	December 31, 2019	February 13, 2015	Action role-playing	Capcom	Capcom
Monster Hunter 4	4.10 million	December 31, 2019	September 14, 2013	Action role-playing	Capcom	Capcom
Super Mario Maker for Nintendo 3DS	3.79 million	December 31, 2021	December 1, 2016	Level editor; platform	Nintendo EAD	Nintendo
Animal Crossing: Happy Home Designer	3.51 million	December 31, 2020	July 2, 2015	Life simulation	Nintendo EAD	Nintendo
The Legend of Zelda: Majora's Mask 3D	3.46 million	December 31, 2022	February 13, 2015	Action-adventure	Grezzo	Nintendo
Fire Emblem Fates: Birthright and Conquest	3.09 million	December 31, 2022	June 25, 2015	Tactical role-playing	Intelligent Systems; Nintendo SPD	Nintendo
Yo-kai Watch †	2.97 million	December 31, 2022	July 11, 2013	Role-playing	Level-5	JP: Level-5; WW: Nintendo
Mario Party: Island Tour	2.95 million	December 31, 2021	November 22, 2013	Party	NDcube	Nintendo
Donkey Kong Country Returns 3D	2.94 million	December 31, 2022	May 24, 2013	Platform	Retro Studios; Monster Games	Nintendo
Mario & Luigi: Dream Team †	2.70 million	December 31, 2022	July 12, 2013	Role-playing	AlphaDream; Good-Feel	Nintendo
Kirby: Triple Deluxe	2.66 million	December 31, 2022	January 11, 2014	Action; platform	HAL Laboratory	Nintendo
Monster Hunter 3 Ultimate	2.60 million	December 31, 2019	December 10, 2011	Action role-playing	Capcom	Capcom
Paper Mario: Sticker Star	2.49 million	December 31, 2022	November 11, 2012	Role-playing	Intelligent Systems	Nintendo
Fire Emblem Awakening	2.37 million	December 31, 2022	April 19, 2012	Tactical role-playing	Intelligent Systems; Nintendo SPD	Nintendo
Yo-kai Watch Blasters: Red Cat Corps and White Dog Squad	2.37 million	December 31, 2022	July 11, 2015	Role-playing	Level-5	JP: Level-5; WW: Nintendo
Yo-kai Watch 3	2.21 million	December 31, 2022	July 16, 2016	Role-playing	Level-5	JP: Level-5; WW: Nintendo
Yoshi's New Island	2.06 million	December 31, 2022	March 14, 2014	Platform	Arzest	Nintendo
Lego City Undercover: The Chase Begins	2.04 million	December 31, 2020	April 21, 2013	Action-adventure	TT Fusion	Nintendo
Monster Hunter XX	1.80 million	December 31, 2018	March 18, 2017	Action role-playing	Capcom	Capcom
Dragon Quest XI: Echoes of an Elusive Age	1.74 million		July 29, 2017	Role-playing	Square Enix	Square Enix
Pokémon Super Mystery Dungeon	1.67 million	December 31, 2022	September 17, 2015	Roguelike	Spike Chunsoft	The Pokémon Company; Nintendo
Kirby: Planet Robobot	1.64 million	December 31, 2022	April 28, 2016	Action; platform	HAL Laboratory	Nintendo
Dragon Quest VII: Fragments of the Forgotten Past	1.60 million	December 31, 2022	February 7, 2013	Role-playing	Heartbeat; ArtePiazza	JP: Square Enix; WW: Nintendo
Mario Tennis Open	1.58 million	December 31, 2021	May 20, 2012	Sports	Camelot Software Planning	Nintendo
Puzzle & Dragons Z: Pazudora Z	1.50 million		December 12, 2013	Puzzle	GungHo Online Entertainment	JP: GungHo Online Entertainment; WW: Nintendo
Pokémon Red / Green / Blue / Yellow (Note: Virtual Console release)	1.50 million	April 28, 2016	February 27, 2016	Role-playing	Game Freak	Nintendo
Professor Layton and the Miracle Mask	1.48 million	December 31, 2022	February 26, 2011	Puzzle; adventure	Level-5	JP: Level-5; WW: Nintendo
Style Savvy: Trendsetters	1.44 million	December 31, 2022	September 27, 2012	Simulation	Syn Sophia	Nintendo
Pokémon Rumble Blast	1.40 million	December 31, 2022	August 11, 2011	Action role-playing; beat 'em up	Ambrella	The Pokémon Company; Nintendo
Bravely Default	1.40 million	December 31, 2022	October 11, 2012	Role-playing	Silicon Studio	Nintendo
Pokémon Mystery Dungeon: Gates to Infinity	1.38 million	December 31, 2020	November 23, 2012	Roguelike	Spike Chunsoft	The Pokémon Company; Nintendo
Kid Icarus: Uprising	1.37 million	December 31, 2020	March 22, 2012	Third-person shooter; shoot 'em up	Project Sora; Sora Ltd.	Nintendo
The Legend of Zelda: Tri Force Heroes	1.36 million	December 31, 2022	October 22, 2015	Action-adventure	Nintendo EPD; Grezzo	Nintendo
Super Street Fighter IV: 3D Edition	1.30 million	December 31, 2022	February 26, 2011	Fighting	Dimps; Capcom	Capcom
Kingdom Hearts 3D: Dream Drop Distance	1.30 million	December 31, 2022	March 29, 2012	Action role-playing	Square Enix	Square Enix
Miitopia	1.22 million	December 31, 2022	December 8, 2016	Role-playing	Nintendo EPD	Nintendo
Fantasy Life	1.11 million	December 31, 2022	December 27, 2012	Role-playing	Level-5	JP: Level-5; WW: Nintendo
Mario & Luigi: Paper Jam	1.08 million	December 31, 2021	December 3, 2015	Role-playing	AlphaDream	Nintendo
Star Fox 64 3D	1.07 million	December 31, 2022	July 14, 2011	Rail shooter	Nintendo EAD; Q-Games	Nintendo
Rhythm Heaven Megamix	1.03 million	December 31, 2022	June 11, 2015	Rhythm	Nintendo SPD	Nintendo
Monster Strike	1 million		December 17, 2015	Role-playing	Mixi	Xflag
Style Savvy: Fashion Forward	1 million	December 31, 2021	April 16, 2015	Simulation	Syn Sophia	Nintendo
Fire Emblem Echoes: Shadows of Valentia	1 million	December 31, 2022	April 20, 2017	Tactical role-playing	Intelligent Systems	Nintendo

== See also ==
- List of best-selling Nintendo video games
