= List of Mario franchise enemies =

Mario franchise enemies
- The Mario franchise has featured many enemies across its series, often commanded by the series' main antagonist Bowser (upper right) to capture Princess Peach. Several have seen variations in different titles, such as the ghost-like Boo, pictured here with a tanuki tail.
- First appearance: Mario Bros. (1983)
- Company: Nintendo

The Mario franchise is a media franchise created by Nintendo. Nintendo is usually the developer and publisher of the franchise's games, but various games are developed by third-party companies such as Intelligent Systems and Nintendo Cube. Games in the Mario franchise primarily revolve around the main protagonist Mario and often involve the trope of Bowser as the main antagonist kidnapping Princess Peach, with Mario then rescuing her. Many characters have goals or plot arcs that vary between series; for example, the Luigi's Mansion games focus on Luigi ridding a haunted building of ghost-like creatures known as Boos, and Wario stars in games that center around his greed and desire for money and treasure.

== Conception and development ==
After the release and success of the arcade game Donkey Kong (1981), Nintendo began work on a follow-up game more prominently focusing on the character of Mario, which released as Mario Bros. (1983). The idea of creating a turtle enemy came as a result of developing its core gameplay mechanics. After designers Gunpei Yokoi and Shigeru Miyamoto established that the game would revolve around Mario possessing superhuman jumping abilities that were to be used to jump between different floors or platforms, they approached how enemies would be attacked. While the Koopa Troopa was first introduced, in the follow-up game, Super Mario Bros. (1985), playtesters found that because it was the only enemy gameplay became quite difficult. As a result they introduced an additional enemies such as the Goomba. Developer Takashi Tezuka meanwhile found that due to memory restrictions of the Nintendo Entertainment System hardware he was unable to add a new character that could fly. Instead, to save on memory he decided to build off of the established Koopa Troopa design by adding wings to the top of his shell. While Miyamoto expressed hesitation at first, he was convinced when he saw the final design, and thus, the Koopa Paratroopa was implemented into the game.

== Characters ==
- Angry Sun – A sentient sun that swoops down at Mario in certain stages in Super Mario Bros. 3. A moon variant of this enemy, introduced in Super Mario Maker 2, can defeat all enemies if Mario touches it.
- Ant Trooper – An indigo colored ant enemy that first appears in Super Mario 3D World. They mostly appear walking on walls or emerging from holes and pipes, though they appear as uncommon enemies. Horned Ant Troopers, spiky variants of Ant Troopers, appears as semi-common enemies, while Big Ant Troopers are immune to any attacks.
- Biddybud – A ladybug-like enemy introduced in Super Mario 3D Land. They usually come in groups of four (one red, one blue, one green, and one yellow) and can be defeated by jumping on top of them. Para-Biddybud is a winged variant of Biddybud. They behave mostly the same, but they fly close to the ground instead of walking.
- Blooper – A sentry-like squid that chases after the player, debuting in Super Mario Bros. Blooper Nannies, a variation of the Blooper, thrust smaller versions of themselves (Blooper Babies) toward the player as a form of attack.
- Bob-omb – A bomb enemy introduced in Doki Doki Panic, later repurposed into Super Mario Bros. 2, with a wind-up key and a fuse, which explodes after a set amount of time or when thrown. King Bob-omb, previously Big Bob-omb, was introduced in Super Mario 64, as a boss character there and in Mario Party 9, Mario & Luigi: Paper Jam, and Mario Party: Star Rush.
- Boo, known in Japan as Teresa – A spherical ghost enemy introduced in Super Mario Bros. 3 as "Boo Diddleys" (a pun on the name of American musician Bo Diddley), which sneaks up on the player from behind while they are facing away from it, inspired by a rage that Takashi Tezuka's wife went into after he came home from work late. With Boo being one of the more popular Mario enemies, their image has been used in official Nintendo merchandise, such as plush dolls and cookie cutters. Boo is considered one of the best enemies in the Mario series. Other variations also exist. A large kind, named Big Boo, appears as an enemy in Super Mario World, Super Mario 64, Luigi's Mansion: Dark Moon, and other titles.
- Bullet Bill – A bullet with angry eyes and clenched fists that is shot out of a cannon called a "Bill Blaster". They have a larger counterpart with a shark-like face, known as Banzai Bills (renamed Boomer Bills in the Lego Super Mario sets and Bomber Bills in The Super Mario Bros. Movie).
- Buzzy Beetle – A black or blue Koopa with a hard, fireproof shell that renders it immune to fire attacks. It can crawl on ceilings and drop down when the player gets too close. They have a red counterpart with a spike on their shells called Spike Top which can crawl on walls.
- Chain Chomp – A metallic ball-and-chain creature that lunges at the player when they approach it. Inspired by a childhood experience of Shigeru Miyamoto's with a violent dog. It was originally intended to be used in The Legend of Zelda series, but ended up being a Mario enemy.
- Chargin' Chuck – A Koopa wearing football gear that mostly charges at the player, and can use items such as baseballs and shovels.
- Cheep Cheep – This circular, usually red, fish debuted in Super Mario Bros. Cheep Cheeps are found primarily in the water, but some can jump in an arc, or fly within a limited range. Variants include Spiny Cheep Cheeps, Eep Cheeps, and Fish Bones. Giant varieties include Cheep Chomp, Boss Bass, and Big Bertha.
- Dry Bones – A skeleton version of a Koopa Troopa. Unlike regular Koopa Troopas, Dry Bones will not retract into their shell when stepped on. Instead, they will collapse and reform after a few seconds.
- Fuzzy – A spiked creature which hangs in the air, and sometimes moves on rails. It debuted in Super Mario World.
- Goomba – A sentient creature that resembles a mushroom, it is the first enemy that the player typically encounters in the games' first levels. Implemented late in the development of Super Mario Bros. as a basic, easy enemy. Variants include larger and smaller sized versions and the winged Paragoomba. Similar creatures include Galoomba, which flips over and can be thrown when stomped on, and Goombrat, which turns at edges. The Goombas have their own king, King Goomba (also called Goomboss), introduced as the first boss in Paper Mario.
- Hammer Bro – A type of helmet-wearing Koopa who throws hammers at the player. It has several variations that throw other projectiles, such as the Boomerang Bro, the Fire Bro, the Ice Bro, and a bigger variant known as a Sledge Bro which can stun the player. A flying variety, called Amazing Flying Hammer Brother, sits on a floating platform. Hammer Bros. have been described as high-ranking members of Bowser's forces.
- Koopa Troopa – A turtle-like foot soldier of Bowser. It retracts in its shell when stomped on, after which it can be used to attack other foes. These enemies come in a variety of colors, and have been depicted as both bipedal and quadruped. Variants include the winged Koopa Paratroopa (also called Winged Koopa Troopa or Flying Koopa Troopa).
- Lakitu – A cloud-riding Koopa with aviator goggles that drops an endless supply of Spinies. It also appears in Mario spin-off games with various roles, including a track marshal in Mario Kart and a camera operator in Super Mario 64. Its Japanese name, Jugemu, comes from the folktale of the same name.
- Magikoopa, known in Japan and Europe as Kameks – A wizard Koopa capable of casting magic spells, turning blocks into foes, power-ups, or coins. Magikoopas first appeared in Super Mario World. Kamek and Kammy Koopa are recurring individuals of this species, appearing in the Yoshi and Paper Mario series, respectively. Like Hammer Bros., Magikoopas appear as elite members of Bowser's army.
- Mechakoopa – A small Bowser robot with a wind-up key that becomes disabled and can be thrown after being stomped on. A variant introduced in Super Mario Galaxy is capable of breathing fire.
- Monty Mole – A mole that burrows underground, and springs out of the ground when the player gets close. Mega Mole is a larger variant that can be ridden.
- Piranha Plant – A leafy, stalk-topped carnivorous plant with sharp teeth that typically lives within pipes. Known as Pakkun Flower in Japan, it has made numerous appearances outside of the Mario franchise, including as a playable character in Super Smash Bros. Ultimate via downloadable content. Variants include Fire Piranha Plants, which shoot fireballs, Jumping Piranha Plants, and more.
- Podoboo – A fireball that jumps out of lava and can bounce off walls. It is also referred to as a Lava Bubble. A Blue Podoboo homes in on the player and jumps out of blue lava and is found in Super Princess Peach, and a variant of the Lava Bubble that chases after the player and spits fireballs appears mainly in the Paper Mario games.
- Pokey – A cheerful spiked cactus with detachable green or yellow body segments, which first appeared in Doki Doki Panic, being incorporated to the Mario universe when the game was reworked into the international Super Mario Bros. 2.
- Rocky Wrench – A mole with a Koopa-like shell who first appears in Super Mario Bros. 3. They appear in airship manholes that throws wrenches at the player. In New Super Mario Bros. Wii, Rocky Wrenches were redesigned to look like Monty Moles, but since Mario Kart 8 Deluxe, they were redesigned again to resemble their appearance in 3. A Rocky Wrench is also a playable character in Mario Kart World.
- Shy Guy – A timid masked creature wearing a robe, which comes in many different colors and variations. It originally appeared in Doki Doki Panic (1987), which was later adapted for international audiences as Super Mario Bros. 2, integrating Shy Guy into the Mario universe. It has since become more commonly portrayed as an enemy to Yoshi since Yoshi's Island. Variants include Snifit, a Shy Guy that fires bullets from its mask, Fly Guy, a Shy Guy that flies with a propeller on its head, and Bandit, a blue Shy Guy that is known for stealing things from the player such as coins and other items. Voiced by Nintendo of America localization manager Nate Bihldorff.
- Spike – A green Koopa creature that attacks with spiked balls, which it throws out of its mouth. First appeared in Super Mario Bros. 3.
- Spiny – A red Koopa with a spiky shell that damages the player if touched from above. They are often thrown by Lakitus in unlimited supplies.
- Sumo Bro – Orange Koopas that pound their feet on the floor (a sumo move known as shiko) that creates a thunderbolt. First appears in Super Mario World. Boss Sumo Bro, the leader of the Sumo Bros, makes his debut as a boss in New Super Mario Bros. U.
- Thwomp – A large stone block with an angry face that is mainly encountered in castles. It attempts to crush the player, usually from above. There is a smaller variation of the Thwomp called a Thwimp.
- Whomp – An anthropomorphic stone slab that slams its face on the ground when the player gets near. It can only be defeated by ground pounding its back. It is inspired by the Japanese mythical wall monster, the nurikabe.
- Wiggler – A caterpillar-like enemy introduced in Super Mario World, which changes color and furiously charges at the player when stomped on. It is a playable character in some games, such as Mario Kart 7. Flutters are Wigglers with butterfly wings.

== Promotion and reception ==
Joel Couture of Dread Central stated that while Mario was by no means a horror franchise, many of the enemies were easily able to induce fear in players, despite existing in titles normally meant to inspire wonder, with some falling into the range of body horror or seemingly unexpected until they attacked. Citing enemies like the Chain Chomp specifically, he pointed out that in contrast to how many of the enemies tended to move at a slow, relaxed pace, it and its variations attacked more aggressively, often held back only by their chains which implied they would otherwise relentlessly attack the player. He additionally highlighted the Thwomps, citing their similar behavior and how their expressions and approach seemed to imply an active hatred towards the player and requiring fast reflexes to avoid.
