= Mario Kart 7 =

2011 video game

- North American packaging artwork
- Developers: Nintendo EAD; Retro Studios
- Publisher: Nintendo
- Director: Kosuke Yabuki
- Producers: Hideki Konno; Yasuyuki Oyagi
- Designer: Yuji Ichijo
- Programmers: Yusuke Shiraiwa; Tim Little
- Artists: Yoshihisa Morimoto; Masaaki Ishikawa; Ryan Powell
- Composers: Kenta Nagata; Satomi Terui
- Series: Mario Kart
- Platform: Nintendo 3DS
- Release: JP: 1 December 2011; EU: 2 December 2011; AU: 3 December 2011; NA: 4 December 2011
- Genre: Kart racing
- Modes: Single-player, multiplayer

Mario Kart 7 (Note: Mario Kart 7 (マリオカート7, Mario Kāto Sebun)) is a 2011 kart racing game developed by Nintendo EAD in cooperation with Retro Studios and published by Nintendo for the Nintendo 3DS. In Mario Kart 7, the player takes control of one of seventeen Mario series characters, who participate in races on various Mario-themed race tracks using specialized items to hinder opponents or gain advantages. In single player mode, players can race against computer-controlled characters in 8 multi-race cups consisting of 32 tracks (4 in each cup) over three difficulty levels. Alternatively, players can race against the clock in a Time Trial mode.

New additions to Mario Kart 7 include hang-gliding attachments for karts (which introduced aerial sections to race tracks for the first time in the series), the ability to drive in first person, gyro controls, and the ability to customize the vehicles' builds. Additionally, Mario Kart 7 supports both local and online multiplayer through Nintendo Network for up to eight players. The ability to play online was discontinued on April 8, 2024, along with Nintendo Network as a whole.

Development of Mario Kart 7 began in early 2010 as a port of Mario Kart Wii. Producer Hideki Konno said that completing the game was an "act of emergency" due to low 3DS sales at that time and because of the very few staff involved in its development. In the end, Retro Studios was involved in the development of the retro tracks (tracks from prior games in the series). Mario Kart 7 received generally positive reviews from critics, who praised its innovations, race tracks, and gyro control option. The game has won several awards and was a commercial success, becoming the best-selling game on the Nintendo 3DS with nearly 19 million copies sold.

== Gameplay ==
Racing in first-person is one of the new elements in this game along with hang gliding and driving underwater. The map seen in the background is Rock Rock Mountain.

Mario Kart 7 retains traditional Mario Kart gameplay in which players race against each other in go-karts across 32 different courses (new and retro). Most of the courses are based on various locations in the Mario series, but two new courses are set on Wuhu Island location from the Wii Fit and Wii Sports Resort games. In addition to traditional button controls, Mario Kart 7 can be played using the Nintendo 3DS gyroscope, in which the action is viewed in first person and the player steers the kart by tilting the entire game system (although the circle pad can also be used while in first person). While most of the race occurs on the top screen of the 3DS hardware, the bottom screen shows an overhead map of the race course. While driving, the players may use power-up items, obtained from running into item boxes located at specific points on the track that are used to hinder the progression of opponents or to help the player in the race. Some of these power-ups include the series staple items such as Koopa Shells, Banana Peels, and Super Mushrooms. Three new items were added: the Fire Flower, which allows the player to shoot up to ten fireballs at other racers; the Super Leaf, which gives the player a tail that allows them to flip over nearby players, collect nearby Coins, and deflect items; and the Lucky Seven, which bestows seven items at once. Coins are also scattered about the tracks; collecting them increases the kart's top speed. Up to ten coins can be collected in each race, but some will be lost if the player comes into contact with hazards or goes out of bounds. Jump actions let players obtain a brief burst of speed when hitting a button prior to driving off ramps, and hang glider attachments sometimes allow for controllable gliding segments as well. In Mario Kart 7, the karts are now fully submersible, and the game adds fully underwater track segments to make use of this feature.

The game features sixteen playable characters, including Wiggler, Honey Queen, Lakitu, and Metal Mario, who are new to the series, as well as Mii characters (which are playable in-game) that are saved in the Nintendo 3DS Mii Maker, bringing the total playable character count to seventeen. Like in the previous installments, characters are divided into three different weight classes which impact their driving styles. Mario Kart 7 also introduced the ability to customize vehicles prior to races. Vehicle bodies, tires, and hang gliders can be customized with differing control attributes.

Mario Kart 7 features four single-player game modes: Grand Prix, Time Trial, Balloon Battle, and Coin Runners. Some modes feature multiplayer options. In Grand Prix, the player races against seven computer-controlled opponents in one of eight different cups, each featuring four tracks. The player receives points based on their finishing position in each race ranging from one to ten. After all four races, there is an award ceremony and the player may receive a trophy if they place in the top three of the final standings. Players also receive a star rank based on their performance ranging from one to three stars. In Time Trial, the player races alone to finish the course in the fastest time possible with access to a Triple Mushroom, usable at any time during the run. The best time for each track is saved and recorded as a ghost, which the player can compete against in later trials. If the player has SpotPass enabled on their Nintendo 3DS, they can download ghosts from other players and can race against up to seven other ghosts simultaneously. In the Balloon Battle and Coin Runners battle games, the players drive around one of six arenas (three from this game and three from the previous installments) to collect items and attack their opponents to score points within the time limit of two minutes. The player could play online via Nintendo Network until the Network's shutdown in April 2024, participating in races or battles with up to seven other players.

== Development ==
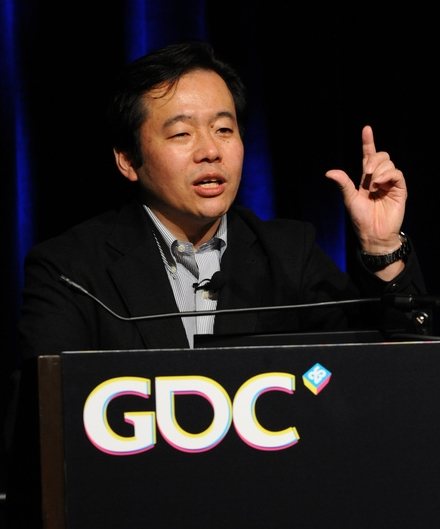
Hideki Konno, who produced the previous Mario Kart title—Mario Kart Wii, returned as a producer for Mario Kart 7.

Nintendo EAD began development on Mario Kart 7 in early 2010. The game was initially conceived as a port of Mario Kart Wii for the 3DS. During development, the idea to have hang gliding and submersible karts, which were planned for Mario Kart Wii, were implemented. The ability to customize the player's kart was added in order to make gameplay more strategic and to boost the multiplayer experience. The game was first publicly announced at E3 2010 under the tentative title Mario Kart 3DS and then shown again at E3 2011, where it was announced for a late 2011 release.

Producer Hideki Konno described that completing Mario Kart 7 was an "act of emergency" due to the Nintendo 3DS' slower-than-expected sales. Because Nintendogs + Cats was scheduled to be released first, Mario Kart 7 was given lower priority and only eight staff members were assigned to begin work on it. When it was time to focus on the game, producer Hideki Konno realized that there was not enough staff available due to many other titles being developed at the same time, including The Legend of Zelda: Skyward Sword, which had its production extended into 2011. In order to finish the game in time for the 2011 Christmas season, Nintendo consulted with Retro Studios, which had just finished making Donkey Kong Country Returns, to co-develop the game. Retro started work on Mario Kart 7 in December 2010. The team focused on producing the classic racing courses, remakes of courses from the earlier Mario Kart titles, in order to learn both "lessons about the development process [for Mario Kart games]" and "about what makes a good course from a design perspective." One of the lead artists for Mario Kart 7, Masaaki Ishikawa, expressed confusion to whether or not Retro Studios was located in Japan. The team behind Mario Kart 7 expressed nervousness over Retro Studios' part in the development of Mario Kart 7, since the team is used to the games being developed by a standalone team in Japan.

When asked about one of Mario Kart 7's new additions—the Kart customization feature, producer Hideki Konno stated that to make Mario Kart 7 more strategic to players, the Kart customization feature was added, which allows the player to choose the frame, kart and glider. Konno's main objective was to make Mario Kart 7 accessible enough for new players so they "can start playing immediately". Konno compared the Kart customization screen to a slot machine. Parts of Mario Kart 7's online community features were originally going to be used in the Nintendo 3DS system software as a whole, including creating online communities and exchanging individual friend codes. Nintendo president Satoru Iwata stated that development time was limited and those features couldn't be added in time, although it was later added in a system firmware update.

The game's soundtrack was composed by both Kenta Nagata, who worked on the previous Mario Kart titles Mario Kart 64 and Mario Kart: Double Dash, and by Star Fox 64 3D composer Satomi Terui.

Shortly after its release, it was discovered that three race tracks had contained glitches that allowed players to skip over a significant portion of the track, often exploited as a cheat during online play. A patch was released in May 2012 that fixed them.

== Reception ==
Reception

Aggregate scores
Aggregator	Score
GameRankings	85.17%
Metacritic	85/100

Review scores
Publication	Score
Computer and Video Games	9.4/10
Destructoid	5/10
Edge	9/10
Eurogamer	8/10
Game Informer	8.5/10
GameRevolution	A−
GameSpot	8/10
GamesRadar+	5/5
GamesTM	8/10
Giant Bomb	3/5
IGN	9/10
Nintendo Life	9/10
Nintendo World Report	8.5/10
Official Nintendo Magazine	93%

Mario Kart 7 has received generally favorable reviews. It holds an 85/100 rating on Metacritic based on 60 critic reviews and an 85.17% rating on GameRankings based on 45 reviews. The game quickly became a commercial success, selling over 2.01 million units on Japan during the first two months. IGN praised "a handful of incredible innovations," such as the new gyro controls and the gliding mechanics, and the game's multiplayer, particularly community features and customizable racing rules, but criticized the small roster of only 17 characters, compared to previous entry Mario Kart Wii's 25 characters. He ended the review by saying that "Overall Mario Kart 7 is a well-polished experience that fans of the kart-racing genre - or of the Mushroom Kingdom - should not hesitate to pick up." Nintendo World Report stated that while the game "isn't a huge leap forward for the series," the online and gameplay make it a "must-have" for 3DS owners.

GameSpot said that the return of Coins changed the strategy of the game and that the glider mechanic, while initially appearing to be a shallow gimmick, revealed significant potential when accustomed to it. Edge said that Nintendo had intertwined the numerous mechanics to make one of the most rewarding racing experience since Super Mario Kart along with a natural integration of 3D.

On the more critical side, James Stephanie Sterling of Destructoid stated that "sticking to tradition has not worked in Nintendo's favor", and felt the game was "lethargic and mundane" and saying the new glider and underwater sections "exist to provide the illusion of variety rather than actually altering the core experience". She ended the review saying "Mario Kart 7 is the one game I'd hold up as the least deserving of any kind of leniency". Giant Bomb noted that "your enjoyment of Mario Kart 7 will likely hinge on your continued appreciation of (the series) formula".

IGN awarded Mario Kart 7 the IGN's Editors' Choice. Mario Kart 7 was nominated for "Best 3DS Game" and "Best Driving Game" at GameTrailers' 2011 Game of the Year Awards, but lost both respectively to Super Mario 3D Land and Forza Motorsport 4. Digital Spy awarded Mario Kart 7 the "Best Game of 2011" for the Digital Spy readers' awards of 2011. Edge awarded Mario Kart 7 as the best portable game of 2011. During the 15th Annual Interactive Achievement Awards, the Academy of Interactive Arts & Sciences nominated Mario Kart 7 for "Racing Game of the Year" and "Handheld Game of the Year". Retrospectively, GamesRadar ranked Mario Kart 7 to be the 12th best Nintendo 3DS game of all time.

Mario Kart 7 is the best-selling Nintendo 3DS game with over 18.99 million copies sold worldwide.
