= New Super Mario Bros. 2 =

2012 video game

- Box art showcasing the game's emphasis on collecting coins
- Developer: Nintendo EAD
- Publisher: Nintendo
- Director: Yusuke Amano
- Producers: Takashi Tezuka; Hiroyuki Kimura
- Programmer: Kenji Higashiyama
- Artist: Masaaki Ishikawa
- Composer: Kenta Nagata
- Series: Super Mario
- Platform: Nintendo 3DS
- Release: JP: July 28, 2012; EU: August 17, 2012; AU: August 18, 2012; NA: August 19, 2012; IND: September 2, 2012
- Genre: Platform
- Modes: Single-player, multiplayer

New Super Mario Bros. 2 (Note: Japanese: New スーパーマリオブラザーズ2, Hepburn: Nyū Sūpā Mario Burazāzu Tsū) is a 2012 platform game developed and published by Nintendo for the Nintendo 3DS. It is the third installment in the New Super Mario Bros. series, following 2009's New Super Mario Bros. Wii, and is a direct sequel to the original New Super Mario Bros. released in 2006 for the Nintendo DS. It is the first Nintendo-published game to be released simultaneously in both downloadable and physical forms.

New Super Mario Bros. 2's plot is similar to its predecessors, focusing on Mario and Luigi's efforts to rescue Princess Peach from Bowser and the Koopalings. It has a heavier emphasis on coin-collecting than other Super Mario games, with multiple unique items dedicated to producing large numbers of coins. New Super Mario Bros. 2 features nine worlds that consist of six main worlds and three special worlds. Those worlds total 81 levels, many of which have multiple exits to unlock more areas in the game to play and explore. The game also features a specialized mode called "Coin Rush", which focuses exclusively on quickly completing a series of stages while collecting as many coins as possible. Additional Coin Rush stages were made available for purchase as downloadable content shortly after the game's release.

New Super Mario Bros. 2 received generally positive reviews, with critics praising its level design, gameplay, and graphics, but criticizing its low difficulty level and strong unoriginality due to its reuse of various assets from prior New Super Mario Bros. games and recycled soundtrack from New Super Mario Bros. Wii. New Super Mario Bros. 2 is the fifth best-selling game for the Nintendo 3DS, with 13.41 million copies sold worldwide as of September 30, 2022. A follow-up to the game and a sequel to New Super Mario Bros. Wii, titled New Super Mario Bros. U, was released as a launch title for the Wii U on November 18, 2012.

== Gameplay ==
Like the previous games in the New Super Mario Bros. series, New Super Mario Bros. and New Super Mario Bros. Wii, New Super Mario Bros. 2 is a 2D platformer, and some of the characters and objects in the game are 3D polygonal renderings on 2D backgrounds. This results in a 2.5D effect (also seen previously in the first New Super Mario Bros. game) that visually simulates 3D graphics. New Super Mario Bros. 2 continues the style of gameplay from the first New Super Mario Bros. game, featuring side-scrolling platform action as Mario or Luigi attempts to rescue Princess Peach from Bowser and the Koopalings.

Power-ups include the Mini Mushroom and Mega Mushroom returning from the first game, and the Super Leaf from Super Mario Bros. 3, which allows the player to tail-whip enemies or to fly. Similarly to Super Mario 3D Land, an Invincibility Leaf will appear if the player loses at least five lives during any non-cannon levels. The Invincibility Leaf grants both the abilities of the Super Leaf and invincibility until the end of the stage. The story has both single-player and multiplayer options; two players, each with their own Nintendo 3DS and copy of the game, play together simultaneously as Mario and Luigi. Like the previous games, players can collect three Star Coins hidden throughout each level, which can be spent to unlock new areas on the overworld map.

New Super Mario Bros. 2 has a strong emphasis on collecting gold coins, in which the emphasis features various new items that are dedicated to producing large numbers of coins. These include Gold Flowers that can turn blocks into coins, rings that can temporarily turn enemies gold, and a mask-esque block that produces coins as Mario (or Luigi) runs. All coins collected are totaled on the title screen and the overworld map. If the player has SpotPass enabled in the game, this total can be uploaded to the Nintendo Network and the player will be updated with the grand total of all coins collected by all players worldwide.

In addition to the main game, which consists of 81 levels, New Super Mario Bros. 2 features a Coin Rush mode, made accessible after the player completes the first world in the game. In Coin Rush, the player must play through three randomly chosen levels collecting as many coins as possible. Both Star Coins and Moon Coins add several coins to the player's running total in this mode. However, the player is given only one life and each level gives a time limit of 50 or 100 seconds. 1-up Mushrooms are replaced by Gold Mushrooms in this mode. If checkpoint flags have been passed or timers have been collected, the time limit will be extended. Getting to the top of the ending flag causes the number of coins gained in a level to double. If the player completes the run, the accumulated total of coins that are collected can be saved as the player's high score, which can be transmitted to and challenged by other players via StreetPass. Additional course packs can be purchased as downloadable content.

== Development ==
In 2010, Shigeru Miyamoto stated that both side-scrolling and 3D Mario games were in development for the Nintendo 3DS. Following the release of Super Mario 3D Land, the untitled 2D Super Mario game was announced during a meeting of investors by the president of Nintendo, Satoru Iwata, in late January 2012. He described it as a "totally new side-scrolling action Super Mario in 2D as a key title for the Nintendo 3DS". Nintendo planned to release the game "in the next fiscal year", which started in April 2012 and ended in March 2013. It was subsequently announced to be released on August 17, 2012, in Europe, and August 19, 2012, in North America.

The game was announced as New Super Mario Bros. 2, a direct sequel to 2006's New Super Mario Bros., during a Nintendo Direct conference on April 21, 2012, with tentative release dates for Japan, North America, Europe, and Australia in August 2012. Nintendo stated New Super Mario Bros. 2 was created "specifically as a pick-up-and-play experience", accommodating players of all skill levels. It was the first retail 3DS game to also be released as a download on the Nintendo eShop on the day of its release. The first three packs of courses for Coin Rush mode were released as downloadable content in Japan and Europe on October 2, 2012, followed by North America on October 4, 2012. Six more packs were released. The second and third set of two packs was released worldwide on October 25, 2012, and December 5, 2012, respectively and the last set of two was released on December 20, 2012, in North America and Europe and on December 21, 2012, in Japan. The final "Gold Classics Pack" was released on November 27, 2012, to celebrate the 300 billion coins milestone and was available to download for free until the end of January 2013. In 2014, an updated version featuring all the DLC pre-installed was released, New Super Mario Bros. 2: Gold Edition. This version was available exclusively at Walmart for Black Friday 2014 as a digital copy pre-installed on the limited edition New Super Mario Bros. 2: Gold Edition Nintendo 3DS XL bundle for $399.

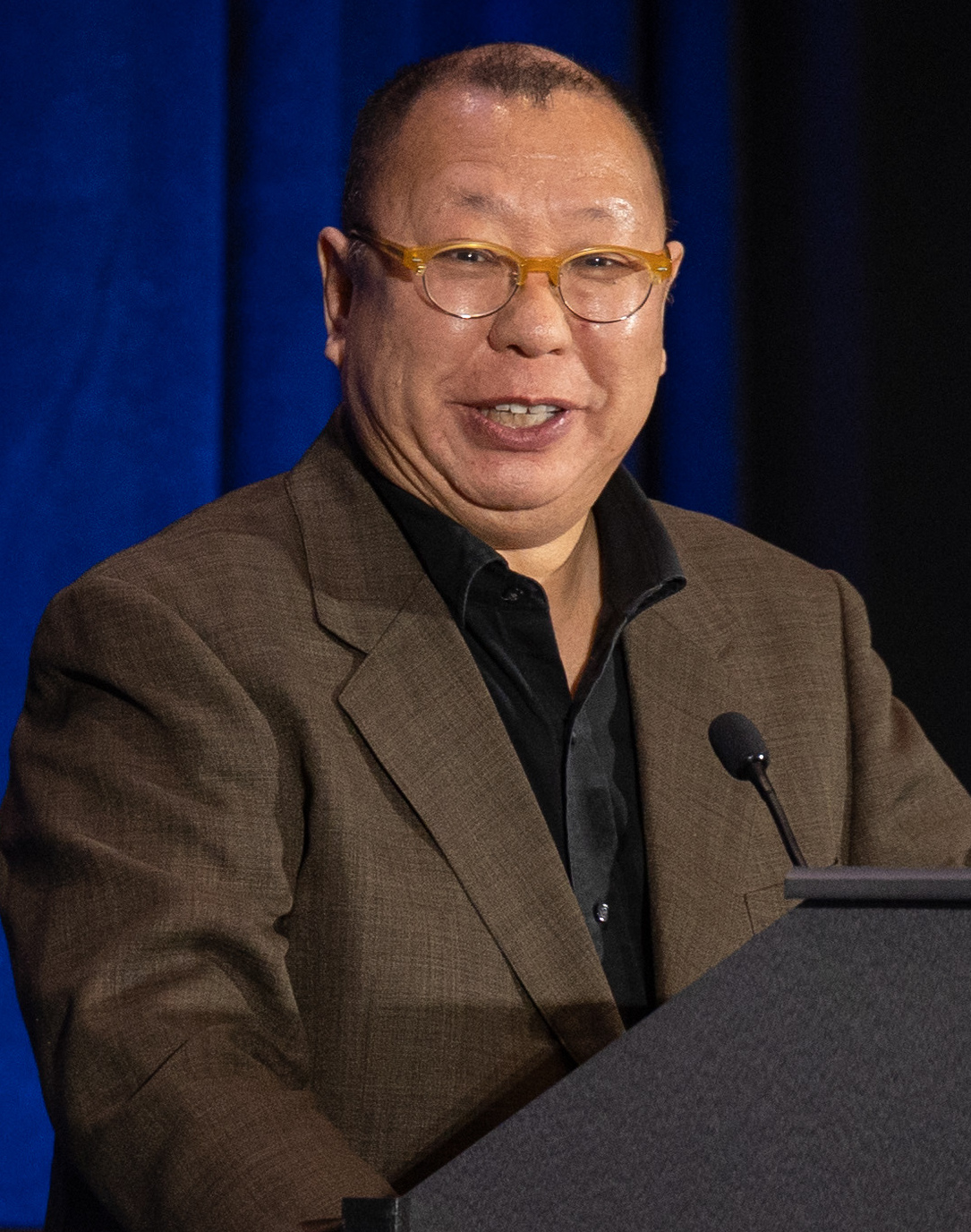
Producer Takashi Tezuka in 2024

The game was not developed by the same team in charge of the first two New Super Mario Bros. games headed by Shigeyuki Asuke, as they were busy working on New Super Mario Bros. U. Instead, it was made by a newly assembled team composed of newer employees, though Mario developer Takashi Tezuka was involved in both games as producer; it was meant to teach newer employees about the development of Super Mario games.

New Super Mario Bros. 2 was developed by Nintendo for the Nintendo 3DS as part of the company's continued effort to expand the 2D Mario platforming series. According to an interview in the Iwata Asks series, the project originated in an unusual way: rather than starting with gameplay mechanics, development began with a team dedicated to course design, informally known as the "Mario Cram School". Led by Takashi Tezuka and Toshihiko Nakago, the program brought together developers from multiple Nintendo departments to study the fundamentals of stage design for 2D Mario games.

Yusuke Amano, who had previously worked on Star Fox 64 3D and New Super Mario Bros. Wii, was appointed director after participating in the course design initiative. He later reflected that he was unexpectedly placed in charge, with no initial designers assigned to the project. Art direction was handled by Masanobu Ishikawa, who joined after completing work on Mario Kart 7. Initially, the project team included few veterans of 2D Mario development, as many experienced staff were focused on New Super Mario Bros. U for the Wii U. Nevertheless, the team expanded with designers from Tokyo's development branch and others with prior experience on 3DS titles.

The Mario Cram School provided a foundation for new team members to understand and contribute to classic 2D Mario design principles. This structure enabled Nintendo to develop New Super Mario Bros. 2 in parallel with New Super Mario Bros. U, marking the first time two games in the series were produced simultaneously.

The development of New Super Mario Bros. 2 benefited from collaboration with staff from the Tokyo Software Development Department, who had previously worked on Super Mario 3D Land. Their experience with stereoscopic 3D was instrumental in enhancing the game's visual presentation, allowing the development team to fully utilize the Nintendo 3DS's 3D capabilities. Initially, the game's backgrounds were flat, but the Tokyo staff introduced visual effects such as simulated depth of field and blurring (bokeh) to create a greater sense of dimensionality. This also improved gameplay clarity by helping players focus on the action in the foreground.

Art director Masanobu Ishikawa noted that the inclusion of subtle graphical features—like blurring based on the position of the 3D depth slider—was inspired by photographic techniques and modern camera functions. These enhancements were intended not only to make the visuals more immersive but also to improve playability.

In addition to visual effects, the team introduced new settings, such as night and evening environments, to distinguish the game from earlier entries, which typically featured bright blue skies. The game also included new enemies, such as Boohemoth, a larger variation of the classic Boo character, designed to surprise veteran players with new behavior patterns.

The developers also experimented with stage design, introducing "Dash Mario" levels where the player is launched from a cannon and must quickly respond with precise timing. These fast-paced levels were inspired in part by the mine cart sequences in Donkey Kong Country and were designed to provide an accessible thrill for players of all skill levels.

The central gameplay theme of New Super Mario Bros. 2—the collection of one million coins—emerged early in development through informal discussions among senior staff, particularly Takashi Tezuka and Toshihiko Nakago. They frequently remarked on how satisfying it felt to collect coins in Mario games. Drawing inspiration from a mechanic in Super Mario 3D Land where coins emerge from a block worn on Mario's head, the team experimented with expanding this idea, eventually designing systems that generated coins rapidly during fast movement.

The concept escalated after one meeting when Tezuka proposed the idea of a "one million coin" goal, which was soon adopted as the game's defining objective. To support this, the development team implemented a variety of coin-generating features, including the Gold Ring, which temporarily transforms enemies like Koopa Troopas, Goombas, and Lakitus into gold versions that spawn additional coins when defeated. These visual elements led to concerns about the game's aesthetics becoming overly garish, but the team ultimately found the effect satisfying and visually rewarding.

A new power-up called Gold Mario was introduced to further reinforce the coin-collection mechanic. Inspired by the classic P-Switch function that turns blocks into coins, Gold Mario can throw fireballs that turn blocks and enemies into coins. This idea originated from the programming team, highlighting their unusually strong creative input during the project. According to director Yusuke Amano, the unified development focus on coin collection helped generate a wide range of creative ideas across departments.

"New Super Mario Bros. Gold" was originally going to be the title of the game, showcasing the game's main focus on coins, but the development team ultimately changed it to New Super Mario Bros. 2 due to considering that the game having more levels than its predecessors was enough to label it as a numbered sequel.

The game's soundtrack was composed by Mario Kart veteran Kenta Nagata, though most of the soundtrack is recycled from New Super Mario Bros. Wii with minor alterations, which was composed by Shiho Fujii, Ryo Nagamatsu, and Kenta Nagata.

== Reception ==
Reception

Aggregate scores
Aggregator	Score
GameRankings	78.40%
Metacritic	78/100

Review scores
Publication	Score
1Up.com	B
Computer and Video Games	8/10
Destructoid	7/10
Electronic Gaming Monthly	9/10
Famitsu	36/40
G4	4/5
GameSpot	7/10
IGN	8.5/10
Nintendo Life	9/10
Official Nintendo Magazine	90%
Polygon	7/10
Forbes	8/10

New Super Mario Bros. 2 received generally positive reviews. It holds an aggregated score of 78.40% on GameRankings and 78/100 on Metacritic, making it the lowest-rated mainline Mario game.

The game was given a 36/40 by Famitsu with a 9 from each of the four reviewers. Electronic Gaming Monthly gave the game a 9/10, stating "This platforming perfection is what makes Mario games so fun, and in that regard, New Super Mario Bros. 2 definitely succeeds with its own share of secrets, collectibles, and branching pathways that can be unlocked depending on how you should advance through the game." Nintendo Life gave the game 9 out of 10 stars, saying "It's immense fun, boasts brilliant level design and offers enough repeat play appeal to keep you glued to your 3DS system for weeks."

Although Official Nintendo Magazine gave the game 90% out of 100, they heavily criticized the game for its 3D effects and lack of progression in the New Super Mario Bros subseries and the greater Super Mario series, summarizing that "New Super Mario Bros. 2 is the very definition of bitter-sweet, giving with one hand and then taking away with the other." They considered that "By default it's the best side-scrolling platformer on the 3DS" but found equally disappointing that in six years of sequels "we'd really expected the series to have progressed a little further than just a 3D effect and Coin Rush mode."

Tom Sykes of Nintendo Gamer gave the game 80 out of 100, praising the new features, but criticizing it for being too similar to its predecessors. "This is a great 2D platformer, but it's lacking the vital creative spark that turns a great 2D platformer into a classic one. We've come to expect more than straight sequels from mainline Mario games, and until this generation we hadn't truly been offered one. That's a definite disappointment, but on the upside, more NSMB is hardly a bad thing. With its obsessive focus on coin collecting, NSMB2 does a few things differently to its predecessor, but not enough to stand tall as its own game. It's a fine companion piece to the original DS game, however, and one that's likely to reside in your 3DS for quite some time."

As of 30 September 2022, 13.41 million copies of New Super Mario Bros. 2 have been sold worldwide, making it the fifth best-selling game for the system.

New Super Mario Bros. 2 was nominated for "Best Handheld Game" at Spike's 10th Annual Video Game Awards.

In 2023, on a ranking of all 2D Mario games TheGamer ranked it 7th and the worst of the New Super Mario Bros. subseries of games, summarizing it as "Moolah And Mediocrity". They strongly criticized the game, pointing out that it "brought nothing new to the formula that had been going for six years by this point, right down to the recycled textures and wholly repurposed soundtrack from the Wii iteration" and finding disappointing that the sequel's "only fresh twist was Mario going full Scrooge McDuck, hoovering up countless coins". They concluded that "on the most basic technical level, it wasn’t 'bad'; but one gets the sense of 'why bother at this point?'" and considered that the other games in the New Super Mario Bros. subseries also offer what this game does, "albeit with less liberal coin placement".

== Legacy ==
A stage based on New Super Mario Bros. 2 appears in Super Smash Bros. for Nintendo 3DS and Super Smash Bros. Ultimate, titled "Golden Plains". If a player collects 100 coins, the character will turn golden and gain both increased attack power and flinch resistance.

Mario's transformation when he touches a Gold Flower, Gold Mario, appears in Mario Kart 8 Deluxe and Mario Kart Tour as an unlockable character. An Amiibo figure was released based on this transformation.
