= Super Leaf =

Fictional power up in Mario

- Mario element
- Publisher: Nintendo
- First appearance: Super Mario Bros. 3
- Genre: Platformer

In-universe information
- Type: Magical leaf
- Function: Transforms user into either a raccoon form or a tanuki form
- Traits and abilities: Gives user the ability to fly and attack with a tail

The Super Leaf (Japanese: スーパーこのは, Hepburn: Sūpā Konoha), also referred to as the Raccoon Leaf or the Tanooki Leaf, is a power-up item that appears in the Mario franchise, being introduced in the 1988 NES video game Super Mario Bros. 3. Depending on the game, the power-up can transform the player character, typically Mario or Luigi, into either a raccoon form or a tanooki form, typically granting the player the ability to attack enemies using a tail and fly or glide. The raccoon form gives the wearer brown ears and a striped tail, while the tanooki form has the ears and tails as part of a tanuki-inspired suit.

== Concept and creation ==
Raccoon (left) and Tanooki (right) Mario

The Super Leaf is a brown leaf that, in some incarnations, has eyes. Depending on the game, it is able to turn the user into either a Raccoon form, which has two ears and a striped tail, or a Tanooki form, which puts them in a brown furred suit. The tail found on both Raccoon and Tanooki forms is based on the Japanese raccoon dog, also known as tanuki, though the Raccoon tail has a ringed tail more similar to a North American raccoon. The Tanooki Suit takes on a certain form depending on the wearer; in Super Mario 3D Land and World, Mario, Princess Peach, Toad and Rosalina have similar outfits to each other, while Luigi transforms into a kitsune instead.

When asked why Mario was given a raccoon tail, series creator Shigeru Miyamoto explained that it felt both practical and in keeping with Mario's style. The idea for a tail first came up when Super Mario Bros. 3 was designed to have a top-down perspective, with designer Takashi Tezuka saying that he wanted to include the ability for Mario to spin and hit enemies with a tail. When the perspective switched to sidescrolling, they added the ability to fly to the Super Leaf power-up's capabilities, as Tezuka had wanted flight in the series since the first game.

In English, the forms granted are called Raccoon or Tanooki (depending on whether it is the ears and tail or the full suit). In Japanese, the forms are called "Tail" and "Tanuki" respectively.

== Appearances ==
The Super Leaf made its debut appearance in the 1988 platform game Super Mario Bros. 3 for the Famicom/Nintendo Entertainment System. In the game, it appears in the first level, World 1-1; the level is designed to teach the player how to use the power-up. Using the power-up, the player is capable of making Mario or Luigi fly, a first for the series, after achieving enough speed through running. It can also be used to hover in the air by mashing the jump button. A special variant called the P-Wing is also featured that provides the player infinite flight for a single level. In addition, the game features an item called a Tanooki Suit. When worn, the user dons a suit based on a tanuki and features the tail swipe, flight, and hover abilities. It also allows the user to turn into a statue, protecting them from damage.

The Super Leaf was intended to be included in the sequel Super Mario World (1991), but this was scrapped. Instead, an item called the Cape Feather was added, which gives Mario a cape that allows him to fly. In the platforming games, the Super Leaf did not appear in another game until Super Mario 3D Land (2011), where they were a key item in the plot, used by both the player-character and several enemies. Unlike in Super Mario Bros. 3, this grants a Tanooki Suit outfit to Mario instead of raccoon ears and a tail. Two other leaves are introduced in this game: The Invincibility Leaf, which gives the player invincibility; and the Statue Leaf, giving them the statue power found in the Tanooki Suit in Super Mario Bros. 3. For Luigi, this game introduces a new form, called Kitsune Luigi, which he gains instead of Mario's raccoon form. This version of the Super Leaf returns in Super Mario 3D World (2013). It later returns in New Super Mario Bros. 2 (2012), giving Mario a design and functionality similar to what is given in Super Mario Bros. 3. In the Super Mario Maker games, the Super Leaf is usable in levels created using the Super Mario Bros. 3 engine.

The Super Leaf appears in the Mario Kart series starting with Mario Kart 7, subsequently appearing in Mario Kart Tour. When used by a racer, it gives them a tail that can swipe nearby opponents and coins until it runs out. In Tour, it allows the user to fly and draws in nearby coins when used. In Mario Kart 8's downloadable content, the character "Tanooki Mario" was added as a playable character. It is also featured in the Super Smash Bros. series, allowing the user to float in the air temporarily and gives the user the ears and tails of the Raccoon form.

== Reception ==
Writer Drew Mackie believed that the distinction between Raccoon and Tanooki forms could reflect the distinction between the real-life version of a tanuki and the yokai bake-danuki. He argued that the ability to turn into a statue in Tanooki form helped distinguish the two. On the inclusion of Japanese mythological themes into Super Mario Bros. 3, he believed that Miyamoto took pride in having done so, arguing that the fact that the Super Leaf and Tanooki Suit transformation sound was first featured in the then-Japan-only video game The Mysterious Murasame Castle was meant to convey to the player "Hey, here is a thing from Japanese culture". Both Mackie and IGN writer Isaiah Colbert drew comparisons between the Tanooki form and Arale Norimaki, the protagonist of Akira Toriyama's manga Dr. Slump. Mackie noted that Arale wore a similar suit prior to the release of Super Mario Bros. 3, stating that he couldn't find proof that she was a direct inspiration, but identified that Miyamoto had used her as inspiration for Mario's running animation in Super Mario 64.

The Tanooki Suit is considered a favorite by critics at multiple websites, including IGN, GameSpot, Game Informer. Dan Ryckert of Game Informer stated that while the Super Leaf was more common, the Tanooki Suit was superior to it in every way. He enjoyed the ability to fly, use the suit's tail to break blocks, and use the tail to fly; for the Tanooki Suit in particular, he found enjoyment in the ability to turn into a statue, which he said was not useful but something he liked to do anyway. TheGamer writer Tristan Jurkovich stated that the Super Leaf deserves "mad props" for introducing flight to the series, adding that their love for raccoons also influenced their opinion that the Super Leaf and Tanooki Suit were the best power-ups. He also discussed how interesting the lore behind the Tanooki Suit power-up was. Inverse writer Robin Bea believed that the Super Leaf redefined the Mario series, finding the Raccoon power-up the most iconic one. She felt that the ability to fly was what made it so impactful, stating that the addition of flight into the series allowed the developers to build levels in new ways. IGN writer Lucas M. Thomas believed that Mario had never been as popular as he was when the Super Leaf was introduced, calling the Raccoon Suit iconic. He felt that the Super Leaf inspired multiple later flight-based power-ups in the series, including the Cape Feather from Super Mario World, Carrot from Super Mario Land 2: 6 Golden Coins, and Wing Cap from Super Mario 64. Thomas also argued that the marketing helped solidify Raccoon Mario as an icon, citing this form being featured on both the cover art for Super Mario Bros. 3 and in the film The Wizard, which depicts someone playing the game competitively.

In 2011, People for the Ethical Treatment of Animals (PETA) released a satirical browser game protesting the appearance of the Tanooki Suit in 3D Land. The game, titled Super Tanooki Skin 2D, features a bloody, skinned Tanooki chasing after Mario to get their fur back. The site for the game asserts that Mario is willing to "use any means necessary" to save Princess Peach, including skinning a raccoon dog. The site also accuses Nintendo of sending the message that wearing fur clothing is acceptable. Nintendo later responded to this, stating: "Mario often takes the appearance of certain animals and objects in his games. These have included a frog, a penguin, a balloon and even a metallic version of himself. These lighthearted and whimsical transformations give Mario different abilities and make his games fun to play. The different forms that Mario takes make no statement beyond the games themselves." Kotaku writer Brian Ashcraft felt that the campaign was designed to generate publicity for the organization, arguing that the Tanooki Suit was based on cultural mythology and that it does not involve harm to an animal, accusing PETA of lacking "consideration or sensitivity". GamePro writer Yassin Chakhchoukh expressed similar skepticism in PETA's motives about whether it was just a marketing stunt.
