= Super Mario 3D Land =

2011 video game

- Packaging artwork
- Developer: Nintendo EAD Tokyo
- Publisher: Nintendo
- Director: Koichi Hayashida
- Producer: Yoshiaki Koizumi
- Designer: Daisuke Tsujimura
- Programmer: Hideyuki Sugawara
- Artist: Kenta Motokura
- Composers: Asuka Hayazaki; Takeshi Hama; Mahito Yokota
- Series: Super Mario
- Platform: Nintendo 3DS
- Release: JP: November 3, 2011; NA: November 13, 2011; EU: November 18, 2011; AU: November 24, 2011
- Genre: Platform
- Mode: Single-player

Super Mario 3D Land (Note: Japanese: スーパーマリオ3Dランド, Hepburn: Sūpā Mario Surī Dī Rando) is a 2011 platform game developed and published by Nintendo for the Nintendo 3DS. It was released worldwide in November 2011 as the first Mario game to be released for the system. It combines elements from both traditional 2D side-scrolling games and modern free-roaming 3D games in the Super Mario series. It also introduces new additional gameplay mechanics and power-ups. The main story is similar to previous installments, centering on Mario's efforts to rescue Princess Peach, who has been kidnapped by Bowser.

Super Mario 3D Land received critical acclaim, with praise for its creative gameplay, utilization of stereoscopic 3D and level design, though its boss fights and lack of creativity were met with minor criticism. As of March 31, 2024, the game was a commercial success, having sold 12.88 million copies worldwide, making it the seventh best-selling game for the 3DS. It was also the first 3DS game to sell over five million copies. Nintendo released the game as a downloadable title via Nintendo eShop in 2012. A sequel, titled Super Mario 3D World, was released for the Wii U in November 2013 and for the Nintendo Switch in February 2021.

== Gameplay ==
Mario jumping in World 1-1. The player's extra lives and reserved power-up can be viewed and accessed from the touchscreen.

Super Mario 3D Land is a platform game that has been described by game designer Shigeru Miyamoto as a "3D Mario that plays as a 2D Mario game". As such, Super Mario 3D Land combines the elements of traditional side-scrolling video game titles, such as linear-based levels, with those of the modern open world titles, such as moving Mario in three dimensions and performing a variety of actions. Similar to the older side-scrolling Mario games, the health system revolves around Mario shrinking upon taking damage from enemies or hazards, there is a dedicated "Dash" button as opposed to using analog input to determine travel speed, and damage as "Small Mario" results in losing a life. Mario has also learned two new moves: a barrel roll and a roll jump, the former of which can be used to break blocks in a similar manner to jumping at blocks from below or ground pounding, and the latter allowing Mario to cover much horizontal ground in one jump. Super Mario 3D Land utilizes a similar level objective to the aforementioned side-scrolling games, in which the point of each level is to reach and grab the "Goal Pole" at the end of the level, within the time limit.

The game offers a number of traditional Mario items, such as the Super Mushroom, Fire Flower and Starman, along with new power-ups that bestow special suits onto Mario and grant him new abilities. Returning from Super Mario Bros. 3 is the Super Leaf power-up, which gives Mario the Tanooki suit, allowing him to float in the air and attack with his tail, with a later variant also allowing him to transform into a statue upon performing a ground pound. The player is able to reserve an extra power-up, which can be retrieved by tapping the item visible on the touchscreen.

Other items include the Boomerang Flower, which allows Mario to throw boomerangs that can collect out-of-reach items and attack enemies; the Propeller Box, which allows Mario to reach high places; and the rare Prize Box, which gives Mario extra Coins while walking around in it. The Invincibility Leaf, which appears after the player dies five times in a level, gives Mario invincibility and Tanooki Suit abilities; while the P-Wing, which appears after the player dies ten times in a level, sends the player right to the end of the level, near the Goal Pole. (The invincibility leaf and the P-wing are only available in regular worlds.) Each course contains three hidden Star Medals that are required to unlock certain levels. The map screen also contains Toad Houses where players can visit Toad and receive additional items, and Mystery Boxes where more Star Medals can be earned. After clearing the game once, a set of "Special" levels are unlocked, some of which contain additional challenges, such as a 30-second time limit. Clearing the S1 castle unlocks Luigi as a playable character, who has slightly different handling to Mario.

Super Mario 3D Land utilizes the Nintendo 3DS's autostereoscopic technology, allowing players to perceive depth when viewing the game screen. While the game is designed to not require the 3D effect, some obstacles or points of interest are deliberately more noticeable or easier when the 3D is switched on. Super Mario 3D Land also utilizes optional use of the 3DS gyroscope, which can be used to control cannons and binoculars. The game also features StreetPass functionality, allowing players to exchange Mystery Boxes containing bonus items. StreetPass also gives players another Toad house so they can get items.

== Plot ==
The "Tail Tree" which stands on Princess Peach's castle grounds, is stripped of all its leaves during a storm. When Mario and the Toads go to inspect the tree the next day, they discover that Bowser kidnapped the princess and plans to use the leaves to give his minions new powers. After rescuing Peach, the Toads and Mario return to the Mushroom Kingdom with Tanooki Suits while Mario carries the princess. Some time later, Luigi is captured by a Koopa Troopa and Peepa. After rescuing Luigi, the brothers conquer the other 7 Special worlds. After Luigi and Mario complete the Special 8 Castle level, the three Toads find out that Bowser has kidnapped Peach again, with the brothers ultimately saving her once more.

== Development ==
Super Mario 3D Land screenshots shown at GDC 2011

Super Mario 3D Land was developed by Nintendo EAD Tokyo, which had previously developed Super Mario Galaxy and Super Mario Galaxy 2, with assistance from fellow Nintendo subsidiary Brownie Brown. Super Mario Galaxy 2 game director Koichi Hayashida directed the game, and the game music was composed by Takeshi Hama, Mahito Yokota and Asuka Hayazaki. Super Mario 3D Land took two years to develop, starting from a development team of two people and ending with a team of 30. The game was first announced by Shigeru Miyamoto in November 2010, stating that both the 3D Mario game as well as a 2D Mario title were in the works for the Nintendo 3DS. Miyamoto described the 3D game as "completely original" and a cross between Super Mario Galaxy and Super Mario 64.

Super Mario 3D Land was designed to bridge the gap between 2D Mario games and 3D Mario games, and influenced by Miyamoto's philosophy of keeping the games fun in nature and making sure the player had the utmost opportunity to enjoy the experience of the game. A main concern during development was making a game that would appeal to fans of the 2D Super Mario games as well as the 3D games; levels were designed so that the player would not get lost, moving Mario in one general direction towards each level's goal.

One of the inspirations behind the creation of the game was technological advances that made it possible to implement certain elements that could not be done in previous Mario games. Satoru Iwata explained that "since 1996, when Mario appeared in 3D in Super Mario 64, it's always been hard for players to judge how to jump and hit a block floating in a 3D space," musing that the Nintendo 3DS autostereoscopy allowed for this issue to be fixed. The development team, which only had experience developing on consoles rather than handhelds, first tried playing Super Mario Galaxy 2 on a small television monitor. When it was found that Mario was too small to see and thus difficult to control, 3D Land's camera system and level terrain needed to be designed for viewing on the small Nintendo 3DS screen, making it easier for players to keep track of Mario. Certain aspects of gameplay were inspired by Nintendo's The Legend of Zelda franchise, including the way that the camera functioned during certain moments. Ideas that were ultimately not incorporated into 3D Land included a pro skater suit for Mario, the ability to change Mario's size to the extreme, and a feature that replaces Princess Peach's face with a photographed face. The game's title was chosen as an homage to the Super Mario Land games released on the Game Boy.

Super Mario 3D Land development was heavily affected by the Tōhoku earthquake and tsunami that occurred on March 11, 2011. The disaster caused public transportation to shut down, preventing Nintendo staff from being able to commute to work, and the Tokyo office remained closed for about a week. Hayashida was inspired by the disaster to encourage his team to communicate more, setting up the office such that staff members could easily see and discuss each other's work. The team also started holding group meetings to play-test 3D Land's levels. Hayashida later mentioned that the team expressed hope that the game would inspire joy in spite of the tragedy.

Satoru Iwata revealed the game at the 2011 Game Developer's Conference and pointed out that the game's tentative logo sported a tail, stating that its purpose would be revealed at E3 2011. Miyamoto later stated that "it's what you think it is", alluding to the Tanooki Suit, a power-up originally from Super Mario Bros. 3. While no exact release date was announced, Miyamoto stated that he hoped to release the game during 2011. The game was showcased at Nintendo's press conference at E3 2011, where a 2011 release date was confirmed, along with the appearance of the Tanooki Suit. While the power-up allows Mario to float down gently, unlike Super Mario Bros. 3 he cannot fly.

Super Mario 3D Land was first released in Japan on November 3, 2011. It was then released in North America on November 13, Europe on November 18, and in Australia on November 24. It was released on the Nintendo eShop in 2012.

== Reception ==
=== Critical response ===
Reception

Aggregate scores
Aggregator	Score
GameRankings	90.09%
Metacritic	90/100

Review scores
Publication	Score
1Up.com	B+
Destructoid	8.5/10
Edge	8/10
Famitsu	9/9/10/10 (Note: Each of the four reviewers in Famitsu scored the game on a ten point scale.)
Game Informer	9.5/10
GamePro	5/5
GameSpot	8/10
GamesRadar+	4.5/5
GameTrailers	9.2/10
Giant Bomb	4/5
IGN	9.5/10
Nintendo Life	9/10
Nintendo World Report	9.5/10
Official Nintendo Magazine	94%
X-Play	5/5

Super Mario 3D Land received critical acclaim. It received an aggregated score of 90.09% on GameRankings and 90/100 on Metacritic, making it the fifth-highest-rated 3DS title on the latter site. The game sold over 343,000 copies in its first week in Japan, helping to move over 145,000 Nintendo 3DS units. Famitsu awarded Super Mario 3D Land a score of 38/40, praising level design, accessibility for beginners and the use of 3D. IGN gave the game a score of 9.5 and an Editor's Choice award, calling it "brilliant and addictive" and stating that "3D gaming has never been fully realized before this". GamesRadar gave the game a score of 9/10, praising its wealth of content, although criticising the inclusion of a run button and some easy difficulty. Game Informer gave 3D Land a 9.5/10, saying "it lives up to the level of quality set by previous entries and is easily the best reason to own a 3DS". They also complimented the use of both a run button and the 3D effects while criticising the "lack of variety in boss battles".

1UP.com's Jeremy Parish gave the game a less favorable review, noting that certain aspects of the game were too easy in nature, musing a "moderately skilled player is never in danger of running out of lives in Super Mario 3D Land". He however noted that the game was creative in its presentation, and offered "clever new twists on the familiar to the knuckle-biting intensity of the final stages." Justin Haywald of GamePro gave the game a perfect score, writing that Nintendo successfully captured the nostalgic aesthetic of the series, while still maintaining technical innovation. He reported, "for every familiar bit of music or a level background that reminds you of Mario games past, you have new abilities to use and deviously designed platforming sections that feel completely unique", while stating that the inclusion of 3D was mostly a gimmick.

GameSpot stated that the game lacked some of the more creative aspects of the best of the series, stating that the 3D was mostly optional, though praised the gameplay as entertaining and fast-paced. X-Play's Russ Frushtick felt that Super Mario 3D Land was the best game yet released for the 3DS, praising the content as surprisingly vast in nature and claiming that the game was twice as long as initially gauged. The game won the "Best Handheld Game" award at the 2011 Spike Video Game Awards. Super Mario 3D Land was awarded the "Best Platform Game Award", and Nintendo 3DS Game of the Year 2011 by GameTrailers. During the 15th Annual Interactive Achievement Awards, the Academy of Interactive Arts & Sciences awarded Super Mario 3D Land with "Handheld Game of the Year".

=== Sales ===
Super Mario 3D Land sold 3.09 million units in the U.S. as of August 2014. In Japan, the game has sold over 1.66 million units as of August 1, 2012. It was the first 3DS game to sell over five million copies. Overall, the game has sold 12.89 million copies worldwide as of March 31, 2024, making it the seventh best-selling game for the 3DS.

=== PETA controversy ===
Super Mario 3D Land's release prompted criticism from animal-rights organization PETA, who created a browser game titled Mario Kills Tanooki alleging that the "Tanooki suit" powerup promoted the live skinning of animals for fur. PETA received negative attention for the game, which led to a response claiming it was a "tongue-in-cheek, a fun way to call attention to a serious issue".

== See also ==
- List of platformers
- 2011 in video games
