= PangaeaPanga =

American ROM hacker, tool-assisted speedrunner, and Twitch streamer

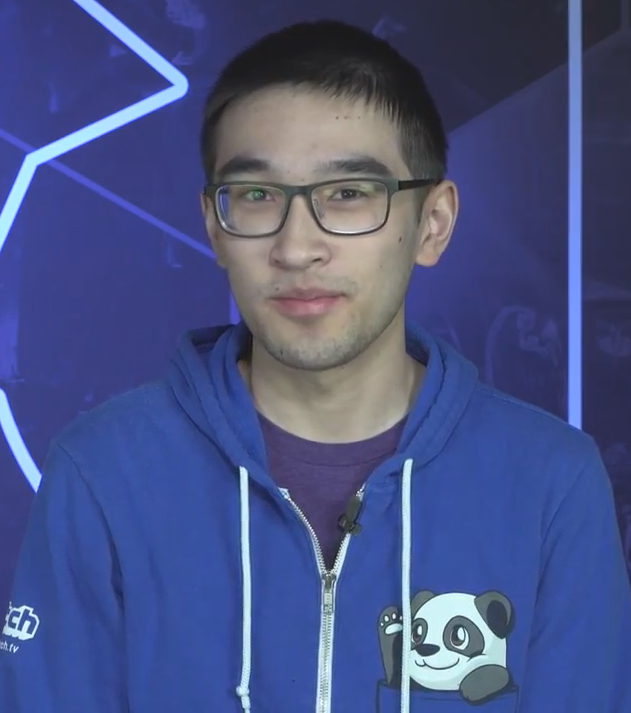
- Born: Alex Tan; March 13, 1996 (age 30)
- Education: University of Connecticut
- Occupations: Speedrunner, livestreamer, YouTuber
- Website: www.pangaeapanga.com:51443/PangaSite/about.html

Alex Tan (born March 13, 1996), better known as PangaeaPanga, is an American ROM hacker, speedrunner and tool-assisted speedrunner. He is best known as the creator of difficult Super Mario World ROM hacks and Super Mario Maker levels. His notable work includes Super Mario World ROM hack Super Dram World and Super Mario Maker levels "P-Break" and the "Pit of Panga" series. He has also played through Super Mario World blindfolded.

== Personal life ==
Tan is from Rocky Hill, Connecticut. He attended the University of Connecticut.

== Speedrunning career ==
Tan was the world record holder for speedrunning Super Mario World in 2015, having beaten the game in 1 minute and 38 seconds using arbitrary code execution, though this record has since been beaten.

Tan started playing Super Mario World while blindfolded on June 16, 2015, and completed a full run of the game this way eight days later. He has stated that he got the idea from fellow player of Super Mario World DavisKongCountry, who played portions of the game blindfolded. To beat the game in this way, Tan memorized a route that was "easy and consistent", using musical cues from the game to know when to carry out certain actions. The run took 23 minutes, despite playing as the character Mario, dying a few times, and getting lost. After having his world record beaten on July 20, 2016, in a time of 17:46, he reclaimed the title a few days later on August 8, 2016, with a time of 15:59 using the Japanese release, before once again having his world record beaten on May 24, 2017, with a time of 13:31.

In September 2015, shortly before Super Mario Maker was released, YouTube removed the majority of Tan's tool-assisted speedrun videos from his channel after a Digital Millennium Copyright Act claim was made by Nintendo. Tan described his YouTube channel as "wrecked" on Twitter and stated that he finds it a "shame" that content creators "are restricted to … Super Mario Maker instead of the way we have always done."

== Super Mario levels ==
=== ROM hacks ===
A segment of Tan's Item Abuse 3, depicting the game's difficult platforming challenges. The game has been cited as the most challenging Super Mario World ROM hack.

Through ROM hacking, Tan has made several difficult levels for Super Mario World, the most famous of which is "Item Abuse 3". This level, which took three years to create and beat, has been described as "the hardest Super Mario World level ever". The level is impossible to beat without making use of tool-assistance to allow individual frame button input. Tan has declared that "[a]nyone who can complete this is pretty much mentally insane."

In addition to the Item Abuse series, Tan has also created four additional hacks inspired by the Kaizo Mario World series titled Super Dram World, Super Dram World 2, Super Dram World 3 and Super Foss World, of which the former two have been speedrun live at a Games Done Quick event.

=== Super Mario Maker ===
In September 2015, 10 days after the American release of Super Mario Maker, Tan uploaded "Pit of Panga: P-Break". The level took five hours to create and had to be beaten before upload. Tan beat the level in nine hours, all of which he streamed on Twitch. "P-Break" was a sequel to "Bomb Voyage", another difficult level Tan created. It took the Super Mario Maker community a collective total of 11,000 tries before speedrunner Bananasaurus Rex beat this level.

By the end of October 2015, "P-Break" was beaten 41 times. After stating that "in an ideal world, no more than ten clears would satisfy me", Tan went on to create the even more difficult "Pit of Panga: U-Break", which was later awarded the world record for the "Most difficult level created in Super Mario Maker" by Guinness World Records. Tan influenced several other people to create unusually difficult Super Mario Maker levels. In an interview, Tan has stated that he never really tried to build easy levels, as he enjoys to "force players to take a single specific route", in contrast to the autonomy video games usually offer players. Furthermore, Tan has noted that he aims to make levels "both fair and fun, without being too aggravating or difficult", which he achieves by playtesting his levels extensively.

One of his Super Mario Maker 2 levels, "Cyber Security 101: Brute Force", required players to enter two random eight-digit numbers, giving a player a 1 in 10 quadrillion chance of winning on a random attempt. Another one of Tan's Super Mario Maker 2 levels, an upside-down kaizo level, also received media attention.

On June 1, 2021, Canadian speedrunner Warspyking became the first player to consecutively beat all 47 levels created by Tan in Super Mario Maker, setting the record at 8 hours, 55 minutes, and 7 seconds.

== See also ==
- GrandPooBear, another American video game livestreamer and speedrunner known for playing and creating levels in Super Mario Maker
- Team 0%, a community project with the goal of completing every user-made level in Super Mario Maker and Super Mario Maker 2
