= Kaizo (disambiguation) =

Kaizo or Kaizō may refer to:

- Kaizo, genre of difficult platforming games
  - Kaizo Mario World, ROM hack that spawned the genre
- Kaizō, Japanese general interest magazine published between 1919 and 1955
- Kaizo Hayashi, Japanese film director
