= GrandPooBear =

American video game streamer and speedrunner (born 1985)

- Born: David Hunt; April 11, 1985 (age 41); Michigan, U.S.
- Education: University of Colorado Boulder
- Occupations: Video game streamer; Speedrunner
- Spouse: Gina Hunt
- Children: 1

Twitch information
- Channel: GrandPooBear
- Years active: 2013–present
- Genre: Gaming
- Games: Super Mario Maker; Super Mario Maker 2; Super Mario World
- Followers: 330 thousand

YouTube information
- Channel: Grand POOBear
- Years active: 2015–present
- Subscribers: 418 thousand
- Views: 275 million
- Last updated: December 13, 2025
- Website: grandpoobear.com

David Hunt (born April 11, 1985), better known as GrandPooBear, is an American video game streamer, speedrunner, and creator of Kaizo Super Mario levels. A Red Bull athlete, Hunt is primarily known for playing and creating levels for Super Mario Maker. He has also performed at various Games Done Quick events and TwitchCon, and has hosted his own in-person and virtual speedrunning events.

== Personal life ==
Hunt grew up in Michigan and attended the University of Colorado Boulder. An avid snowboarder, he was in an accident in April 2013 which left him severely injured. While spending months in recovery, he turned to video games as a new passion to focus on, saying: "I was bored on the couch, and I decided I wanted to become really good at one video game, Super Mario Bros. 3."

Hunt lives with his wife, Gina Hunt, who helps operate their streaming business. They had their first child in January 2019.

== Career ==
Hunt started his streaming career playing DayZ, and soon moved on to Super Mario Bros. 3 speedrunning. After the 2015 release of Super Mario Maker, Hunt began learning Kaizo techniques from playing over 5,000 hours of the game, including levels created by PangaeaPanga, and created a series of video tutorials on Kaizo game mechanics with walkthroughs of his own levels. He became a prominent video game streamer of Super Mario Maker 2, and helped found the company Warp World, which focuses on creating software applications that help streamers. He is well known for completing unique or difficult challenges, such as spending over a year clearing 1,000 expert levels in a row in Super Mario Maker 2, or becoming the first person to beat Super Mario Bros. 3 with the Nintendo Power Glove. As of 2020, he is a full-time game streamer.

Prominent Kaizo creator BarbarousKing named his Grand Poo World series after GrandPooBear. Hunt has said, "the first [Grand Poo World] changed how people make ROM hacks." Hunt was invited to become an official Red Bull Esports Athlete on December 14, 2018.

=== Speedrunning events ===
Hunt has also appeared at and hosted a number of speedrunning events and other video game tournaments, both in-person and virtual. He has performed speedruns of both Super Mario Bros. 3 and Super Mario Maker at various Games Done Quick events, participated in Fall Guys tournaments at Twitch Rivals events, and performed with other streamers in a recreation of the TV show Survivor in Animal Crossing: New Horizons.

At Summer Games Done Quick 2018—in a speedrun race of Super Mario Bros. 3 against another streamer, Mitchflowerpower—Hunt attracted attention for accidentally causing his opponent's game to crash, forcing him to restart the game. Hunt waited for his opponent to catch up as a show of sportsmanship, but the game crashed again later in the event. No prize money was at stake, but Hunt said: "I caused it. I take responsibility. I'm gonna take 5 to feel bad and be back out. Mitch deserved a better ending."

In addition to appearing at events, Hunt has also hosted his own series of in-person speedrunning events called GrandPOOBear's Speedrun Sessions. These events were co-operated by Hunt's sponsor Red Bull, and in some cases were run as a component of Red Bull's own AdrenaLAN event. The events focused on Super Mario-related games, and have featured other streamers and speedrunners from the community.

Hunt is featured in the 2023 documentary film Running with Speed, narrated by Summoning Salt.

== Controversies ==
=== Deletion of Super Mario Maker levels ===
During his career, Hunt has played Super Mario Maker, a game that allows players to design and publish their own video game levels. In January 2016, one of Hunt's levels named "Pile of Poo-POOgatory" was deleted from Nintendo's platform. A representative from Nintendo said the level was deleted because of the word "poo" in the level title (despite the fact that the Super NES title EarthBound had a character named "Poo" in it). After appealing, the same representative called Hunt during a stream and claimed the level would be restored. A few days later, Nintendo recanted the decision, and the level remained deleted. One month later, Hunt found that Nintendo had deleted all of his levels without notice. In this case, Nintendo confirmed that Hunt's content had not been flagged for inappropriate activity such as cheating, but did not say why the content was deleted.

A similar incident occurred in 2019 with Hunt's content on Super Mario Maker 2, this time with Nintendo threatening to ban Hunt from the platform. Hunt was not the only individual to have levels deleted in this manner, for which Nintendo has received criticism from news outlets such as Kotaku and Polygon. Other creators such as PattyTTV spoke out in support of Hunt, but Nintendo did not comment on why Hunt's content was removed.

=== GlitchCon "stream-sniping" incident ===
In late 2020, Hunt participated in GlitchCon, a part of the Twitch Rivals program. While playing in a Fall Guys tournament, Twitch found that xQc, one of Hunt's teammates, engaged in "stream sniping" during the tournament, a tactic where a player watches an opposing team's stream to gain a competitive advantage using their opponent's point of view. All members of xQc's team, including Hunt by association, had to return all prize money they had received, and they received both a six-month ban from participation in Twitch Rivals and a seven-day suspension from streaming on Twitch. Hunt's seven-day suspension, along with one other team member, was later reduced to only three days. Hunt publicly apologized for the incident and said: "I should have said something, instead I got swept up in playing with a group I don't normally do."
