= Yasuhisa Yamamura =

Japanese video game designer

- 山村 康久
- Born: December 10, 1964 (age 61); Hyōgo Prefecture
- Other names: Yamahem, Yamahen
- Occupation: Video game designer
- Employer: Nintendo

Yasuhisa Yamamura (Japanese: 山村 康久, Hepburn: Yamamura Yasuhisa; born December 10, 1964 in Hyōgo Prefecture) is a Japanese video game designer working for Nintendo. He was involved as a level designer in the development of numerous games in the Super Mario and The Legend of Zelda series. Speaking about his work on the action-adventure The Legend of Zelda: Link's Awakening, he specified his contributions as the conception of routes, the placement of enemies and the creation of environments. Yamamura's level design philosophy takes into account experienced players skipping areas, with him stressing "the importance of omission and its effects". A regular visitor of amusement arcades, he collects used circuit boards. He is also referred to by the nickname "Yamahem" or "Yamahen" (やまへむ, Yamahemu). In 2006, his work on the map and level design of New Super Mario Bros. was nominated for the National Academy of Video Game Trade Reviewers Award in the category "Game Design". The pigeon character Yamamura that debuted in the platform game Super Mario Maker is named after Yasuhisa Yamamura.

== Ludography ==
Year	Title	Role
1985	Soccer	
1987	Zelda II: The Adventure of Link	Director
1987	Yume Kōjō: Doki Doki Panic	Course design
1988	Super Mario Bros. 2	Course design
1991	The Legend of Zelda: A Link to the Past	Assistant director
1993	The Legend of Zelda: Link's Awakening	Dungeon design
1995	Yoshi's Island	Course design
1996	Super Mario 64	Course director
1997	Star Fox 64	Course design
2001	Super Mario World: Super Mario Advance 2	Map director
2002	Yoshi's Island: Super Mario Advance 3	Map director
2003	Super Mario Advance 4: Super Mario Bros. 3	Map director
2005	Yoshi Touch & Go	Map & level design
2006	Yoshi's Island DS	Supervisor
2006	New Super Mario Bros.	Map & level design
2009	New Super Mario Bros. Wii	Map & level design
2012	New Super Mario Bros. U	Level design
2013	New Super Luigi U	Level design
2013	The Legend of Zelda: A Link Between Worlds	Field planning
2015	Super Mario Maker	Artbook design
2016	Super Mario Maker for Nintendo 3DS	Level design lead
2019	Super Mario Maker 2	Game design
2023	Super Mario Bros. Wonder	Course level design
