= Legend Maker =

- Developer: Justin Sink
- Series: The Legend of Zelda (unofficial)
- Engine: GameMaker
- Platform: Windows
- Genres: Action-adventure, level editor
- Mode: Single-player

Legend Maker, formerly known as Zelda Maker, is an indie video game developed by Justin Sink. Inspired by Super Mario Maker, it allows players to create their own top-down adventure games in a similar graphical and gameplay style to early games in Nintendo's Legend of Zelda series. A first demo of the game was released in 2015, but was subject to a cease and desist and copyright takedown from Nintendo, despite positive feedback from critics and fans. The game was then rebooted with similar, yet original art assets as Legend Maker so as not to infringe on Nintendo's copyrights. While a 2016 Kickstarter campaign failed, the game remains in development as of 2025.

== Development ==
Creation of Legend Maker began in 2015, when Nintendo stated that it would be too difficult to create an official game in the vein of Super Mario Maker, but for Zelda. Hobbyist developer Justin Sink took it as a challenge and began creating a GameMaker game that would let fans make Zelda levels, in the hopes that Nintendo would realize it was not as hard as they believed. The game then went viral, showing that fans were interested in such a concept. However, videos of the game, as well as the prototype's download, were taken down as copyright infringement. Sink was aware of Nintendo's reputation for cracking down on fan works, and had been prepared for the situation, setting out to create a new engine and artwork in order to relaunch the game as Legend Maker. Despite this, a lack of development skill caused the game to enter development hell. He eventually used the game to create a different, standalone game, Runiya, setting up a Patreon for it.

== Reception ==
In its original incarnation as Zelda Maker, the game was positively received. Mark Serrels of Kotaku Australia called it "pretty cool", but stated that he was not sure the game would have the same impact as Super Mario Maker if it existed as an official product, due to the effort involved to create an entire Zelda world. Meanwhile, Emanuel Maiberg of Vice said that the game made a "strong case" for the existence of an official Zelda Maker, noting that, like Super Mario Bros., it was 2D with a clear design language. Mitch Vogel of Nintendo Life said that the game was "rather impressive", despite still being in an early stage of development, while Ben Reeves of Game Informer called it a "fun little project".

In a later article highlighting the game's Kickstarter campaign, Thomas Whitehead of Nintendo Life called it "interesting", saying that such a game was desired by many fans.
