= Team 0% =

Project for clearing user-made levels in Super Mario Maker games

- Type of project: Clearing all user-created levels in Super Mario Maker and Super Mario Maker 2
- Established: December 2017; 8 years ago
- Status: Super Mario Maker: Complete; Super Mario Maker 2: Active
- Website: Super Mario Maker: issmmbeatenyet.com Super Mario Maker 2: www.team0percent.com

Team 0% is a community project with the aim to ensure that every user-made course in Super Mario Maker and Super Mario Maker 2 has been completed by at least one person other than the original uploader.

The project completed all courses in Super Mario Maker before the scheduled shutdown of the Wii U and Nintendo 3DS online servers in April 2024. As of April 2024, the project's goal is to clear all uncleared courses in Super Mario Maker 2.

== Background ==
Super Mario Maker is a 2015 video game for the Wii U (Note: A version for the Nintendo 3DS exists, but online course sharing was not possible on this platform.) wherein players can create and play 2D platformer levels known in-game as "courses" using mechanics from various entries in the Super Mario series. These courses could then be published for others to play, as long as the course's creator was able to verify the course by first completing it themselves.

== History ==
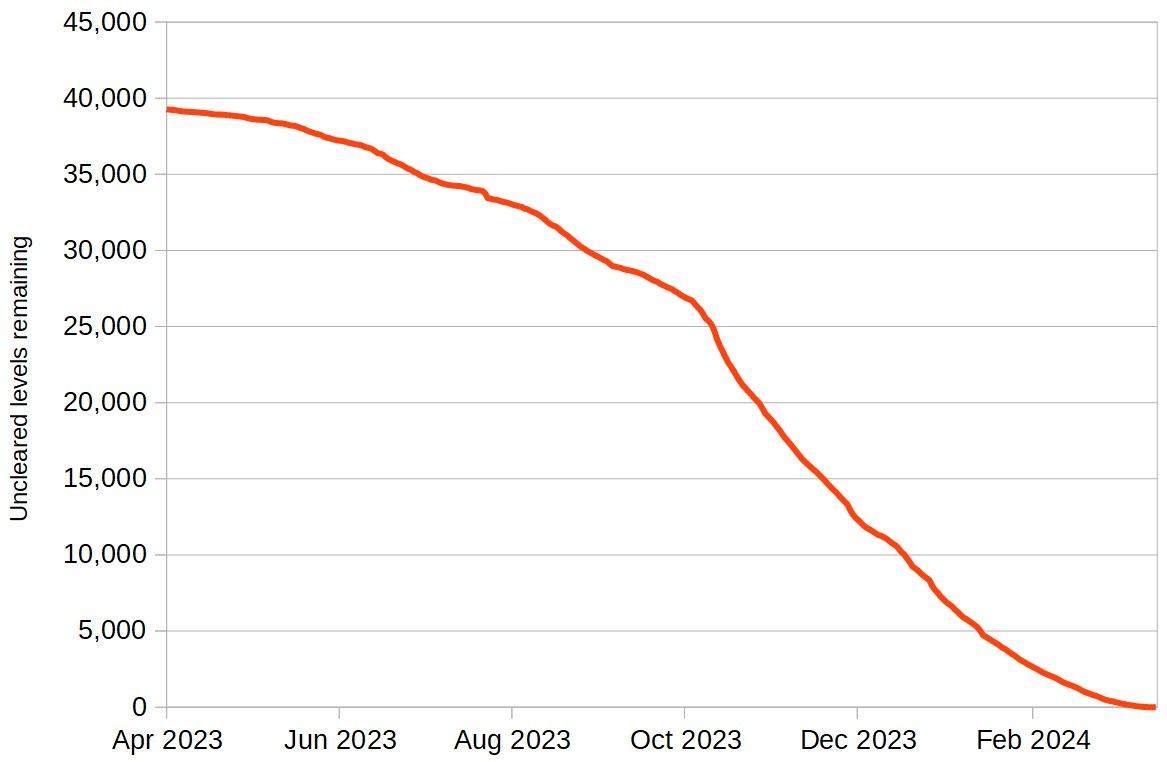
A line chart showing the number of uncleared courses in Super Mario Maker from March 2023 to February 2024

Team 0% began in 2017 when a player compiled a spreadsheet of courses uploaded in 2015 with a zero percent clear rate (meaning nobody online had cleared the course) in Super Mario Maker and shared it on Reddit. Players online then created a Discord server dedicated to clearing all courses on the spreadsheet. In March 2021, Nintendo permanently suspended new uploads to Super Mario Maker, fixing the number of courses in place and thereby making it possible to clear every course. Attention from streamers grew the project's popularity, and by February 2023, there were 41,113 uncleared courses.

In October 2023, Nintendo announced the closure of their online services for the Wii U and 3DS, including Super Mario Maker, meaning the courses would no longer be accessible after the deadline of April 8, 2024. Four weeks after the shutdown announcement, the team had cleared 7,384 more courses, with fewer than 25,000 courses remaining. By March 5, 2024, 178 courses remained.

On March 15, 2024, the last course, titled "The Last Dance", was cleared by the user Yamada_SMM2 (天王寺やまだ). It was believed that another course, "Trimming The Herbs", remained, and it was attempted over 280,000 times. A week later, the creator of that course revealed that it was uploaded using a tool-assisted superplay, excluding it from being a "legitimate course". Despite this, the level was cleared on April 5, 2024, by sanyx91smm2.

In response to Team 0%'s success, a developer of Super Mario Maker, Takashi Tezuka, said, "That's actually pretty cool," and told Ars Technica he would tell the team about the project.

As of April 2024, Team 0% plans to continue clearing all courses in Super Mario Maker 2.

== Rules ==
Courses considered necessary for clearing are humanly possible courses. Courses uploaded using cheats that are impossible or not uploaded legitimately were excluded. Similarly, courses that were possible with glitches that were later patched in software updates of the game and cannot be beaten in an unintended way were not counted as clearable. Most of these had been deleted by Nintendo.

For a course to be considered "cleared", the course must be cleared legitimately without cheats or external tools. They cannot be cleared by the creator of the course, as the game does not recognize that as a course being cleared.

== See also ==
- PangaeaPanga
- Video game culture
- Internet culture
