= Kaizo =

Philosophy of game design

Kaizo (Japanese: 改造, Hepburn: kaizō; meaning "modification", "rebuild", "remodel" or "reconfiguration") is a philosophy of game design, specifically platforming games, distinguished by a high degree of strictness placed upon the player's intended actions and movements through a level. This emphasis on precision, which manifests in the form of extremely-precise character movement (often enforced through subterfuge and purposefully hidden traps), requires the player to use high levels of skill and knowledge of the game's physics and engine in order to accomplish tasks. The philosophy is most closely associated with ROM hacks of Super Mario World and with community-created levels in Super Mario Maker and Super Mario Maker 2, but has been cited as an influence in other fan-made and original game designs.

The term originally came from the Japanese ROM-hacking scene, where kaizo was used as a general term for all modified games.

== Origin ==
The creation of ROM hacks for Super Mario games began in 1987 with the release of Tonkachi Editor, a hex editor for the Famicom Disk System. While the program did not achieve commercial success, it included on its floppy disk a demo feature to modify a disk copy of Super Mario Bros., turning it into a ROM hack called Tonkachi Mario which can be considered a precursor to similar projects. The editor's official documentation, released in installments, also frequently referenced Super Mario Bros. for practical examples, documenting its structure. Like later established hacks, Tonkachi Mario requires the player to be dedicated to understanding the quirks of the game engine, such as knowing about bugs in the programming in order to be able to pass through walls that are normally impassable.

Kaizo Mario World was released in 2007 by T. Takemoto on the Japanese platform Niconico. The first hack to officially use the phrase kaizo in the title, it introduced many elements that would become synonymous with the design style: "kaizo blocks"—invisible blocks that are placed precisely where a player believes they should jump in order to punish their assumption, auto-scrollers that constantly increase in speed, post-goal obstacles (known as "kaizo traps") that require the player to take a specific action before finishing, and "Ultra Star": a level consisting of extremely precise platform jumps and switches.

== Rise in popularity ==
=== Kaizo Mario World and early YouTube ===
T. Takemoto's video on NicoNico was reuploaded and shared on English-language websites under the title Asshole Mario, and became a viral hit due to the extreme demands of the player and the humor in discovering all of the hidden traps. The first Let's Play has over 5.5 million views on YouTube, and Takemoto released sequels in 2008 (Kaizo Mario World 2) and 2012 (Kaizo Mario World 3), with the latter in particular being considered one of the most difficult ROM hacks to date, mainly due to the heavily modified Bowser fight which is based on random factors.

=== Games Done Quick ===
Many experienced players at the time assumed that the games were unlikely to be played through by human players, if at all, and that it was primarily a genre for tool-assisted speedrunning. As the games became more popular and accessible, however, more experienced players within the Super Mario World speedrunning community began to attempt the games as a way to challenge their skills and break the monotony of record grinding. This led to the feature of Kaizo Mario World 1 by dram55, a world-class runner of Super Mario World at Awesome Games Done Quick 2015 in 24 minutes and 36 seconds.

This run served as the springboard for the inclusion of Kaizo Mario World, Super Mario Bros. 3, and Super Metroid fangames in following events, including notable runs by GrandPooBear, MitchFlowerPower, Oatsngoats, and individual and relay races of both full hacks and custom-created levels. Kaizo inclusions in GDQ events have served to inspire many to both play and create kaizo games, as well as generate media for both the marathons and the community.

=== Super Mario Maker ===
The ability for a player to make and play their own kaizo-style levels was extended to a much wider audience with the release of Super Mario Maker in 2015. Prior to this, all games such as Kaizo Mario World were made using Lunar Magic, a Super Mario World level editor, and distributed non-commercially via patches to players who applied them to legally owned copies of the game and played them via emulator or through custom cartridges.

With Mario Maker, creative tools were given directly to players, along with the distribution and means to share and access creators and levels quickly. This, combined with the high sales for the game worldwide, led to a surge in interest in kaizo, as well as an influx of players and creators looking for people to showcase their work. Early examples of kaizo levels reaching notable mainstream attention include the creations of PangaeaPanga, whose "Pit of Panga" series of levels, including "P-Break" and "U-Break," would set records for playthroughs, clear rate, and viewership.

=== Livestream popularity and community ===
As kaizo's popularity first started due to views and playthroughs uploaded to Youtube, it has continued in part through livestreaming and community participation on platforms such as Discord and Twitch.

As the creation and distribution of ROM hacking is legally unable to be commercially monetized, many creators also participate in playthroughs and livestream events. Creators and players also come together to share new hacks, resources, and to mentor and encourage new creators within the genre. Kotaku describes the community as "friendly, competitive, and creative" with famous players alongside new players.

The popularity of the subgenre remains strong, especially on video platforms such as Twitch and YouTube. Well-known content creators, such as BarbarousKing, GrandPooBear, ThaBeast721, CarlSagan42, ryukahr, Shoujo, and PangaeaPanga, have several hundred thousand subscribers and regularly have thousands of live viewers.

=== Pokémon Kaizo ===
The kaizo series of Pokémon fan games (especially Emerald Kaizo) started to grab the attention of YouTubers and Twitch streamers in 2019–2020, as channels such as ChaoticMeatball and zwiggo started to upload challenge runs using mono-typed teams and other restrictions. These games are known for having enemy trainers with complicated teams and movesets, forcing the player to fight most trainers, who are often optional in the original games, and limiting resources for the player. This includes preventing them from using healing items in battle, only allowing them access to under-powered Pokémon against much stronger enemy teams, and limiting access to powerful moves such as stat-boosting moves, forcing them to strategize against enemy teams rather than casually play through the game. They are also known for having difficult and complicated overworld puzzles. Other kaizo games include Blue Kaizo and Crystal Kaizo, while advanced difficulty ROM hacks such as FireRed hack "Radical Red" and Emerald hack "Run & Bun" are often associated with the kaizo series due to their similar level of difficulty.

In May 2022, the YouTube channel Pokémon Challenges uploaded a video titled, "How I Beat the Hardest Pokémon Game Ever Made", detailing his 151st (and final) attempt to beat Pokémon Emerald Kaizo while following the "Hardcore Nuzlocke" challenge rules, meaning he had to permanently store all fainted Pokémon, only catch the first encounter in each area, keep his Pokémon levels under a self-imposed cap, and restart the run should he lose a battle. This video features other YouTubers such as WolfeyVGC and Jaiden Animations and has accumulated over 7 million views. Since his victory, multiple streamers and YouTubers, such as WolfeyVGC, have also completed "Hardcore Nuzlocke" challenges of Emerald Kaizo and beating the game has become a status symbol within the Nuzlocke community. In February 2023, Twitch streamer Prouty completed a "Hardcore Nuzlocke Deathless" challenge of Emerald Kaizo, meaning that not a single one of his Pokémon fainted during his run. This run was celebrated by Pchal, who made a video in December 2023 breaking down this run.

In March 2026, the "official" sequel of Emerald Kaizo got released under the name of Platinum Kaizo.

== Design philosophy ==
The primary attribute of kaizo design philosophy is restriction. In contrast to regular platforming games, where players may have freedom to repeat and try multiple techniques to reach the desired objective, kaizo design intentionally focuses on taking away time and opportunity from the player in order to force a specific solution and specific method of execution.

Beekaay, an SMW Central moderator, explains the motive and intent behind kaizo design as follows:

In general, Kaizo hacks are unforgiving. They don't have sprinkled power-ups throughout the level to allow you to get hit and keep going. Missing a jump or getting hit by an enemy results in a death. If there is a mushroom in a level, it has a specific purpose, such as for breaking spin blocks or damage-boosting through some munchers, and you will not have it past a point determined by the author.

A hallmark of kaizo gameplay is the frequent and repeated death of the player in the course of the playthrough, even by highly skilled players. This constant cycle is considered part of the learning process, and many kaizo games do not punish the player beyond a forced restart (that is, there is no reduction of score or limit on total lives).

=== Scholarly review ===
Game design, mass communication, humanities, and new media scholars have used kaizo design philosophies as a subject for analysis in the relationship between players, level designers, audiences and the motivations and rationale for making and playing video games.

Wilson and Sicart consider the kaizo philosophy among examples of "abusive design" in video games—a deliberate, violent break with established conventions in game design and a resulting artistic approach to the medium:

The "true" game, as exemplified by games like Kaizo Mario as described above, is not about mastering the system, but about knowing the designer. Therefore, the activity of play is not instrumental or tool-oriented, but productive and oriented towards the intersubjective. Play, in our view, is only productive in dialogue.

— Douglas Wilson and Miguel Sicart, Now It's Personal: On Abusive Game Design

== Selected examples ==
=== Super Mario World ===
SMW Central has hosted hundreds of kaizo hacks since 2014.

| Name | Year released | Author | Notes |
|---|---|---|---|
| Kaizo Mario World | 2007 | T. Takemoto | Pioneering hack of the subgenre. Also known as Asshole Mario, Friend Mario. |
| Super Dram World | 2015 | PangaeaPanga | Early "Western" kaizo hack; a tribute to the speedrunner "Dram55". Contains many sections that are intentionally frustrating. |
| Super Panga World | 2017 | Linkdeadx2 | Extremely difficult kaizo hack, known for its sometimes complex flight maneuvers and an overall high level of difficulty. Created as revenge for Super Dram World. |
| Quickie World; Quickie World 2 | 2018, 2019 | Valdio | Designed to be approachable for players familiar with Super Mario World but new to the kaizo genre. The series also includes a spin-off hack called Quickie World: With a Vengeance which was created within 27 hours. |
| Invictus | 2018 | Juzcook | Invictus is a popular hack focused on reasonable difficulty and new mechanics. |
| Grand Poo World; Grand Poo World 2; Grand Poo World 3 | 2017, 2019, 2023 | Barbarian (BarbarousKing) | Tributes to streamer GrandPooBear. Hack trilogy with an extreme level of difficulty; however, also known for offering a particularly sophisticated game experience. While Grand Poo World mainly relies on original game mechanics and assets, Grand Poo World 2 makes more use of specially developed assembler code. Grand Poo World 3 continues the trend with more custom additions, including non-platforming gameplay sections. |
| Love Yourself | 2022 | Chondontore | Widely elaborated and comparatively simple ROM hack that is often recommended for beginners in the genre. While many basic techniques like regrabs are used, the game forgoes more advanced techniques, such as shell jumps. |
| Baby Kaizo World | 2018 | Nowieso | Hack explicitly aimed at beginners. Offers short levels that explain basic concepts relatively briefly and then sends the player through levels that use the explained mechanics. |
| Learn 2 Kaizo | 2018 | NeXuS15 | A training hack that focuses on teaching and training individual mechanics. |

=== Super Mario Bros. 3 ===
| Name | Year released | Author | Refs |
|---|---|---|---|
| Kaizo Mario Bros. 3 | 2015 | Hunter W. | |
| Super Mario in The Final Kaizo | 2016 | Mitch Fowler (MitchFlowerPower) | |
| Kamikaze Bros. 3 | 2016 | Barbarian (BarbarousKing) | |
| Super Barb Bros | 2018 | LuckyLewin | |
| Mini Kaizo Bros. 3 | 2019 | Mitch Fowler (MitchFlowerPower) | |
| Super Calm Bros. | 2019 | PACO | |
| Super Slasher Bros. 3 | 2019 | EvilElf | |
| Super Orb Bros. | 2020 | OrangeExpo | |
| Git Up, Git Out, Git Gud. | 2022 | WilsonPenn | |
| Riff Bros. 3 | 2018 | Freakin_HA | |

=== Other notable examples ===
| Name | Year released | Author | Base game | Refs |
|---|---|---|---|---|
| Kaizo Mario 64 | 2009 | OmegaEdge29 | Super Mario 64 | |
| Super Metroid Impossible | 2006 | Saturn | Super Metroid | |
| Pokémon Emerald Kaizo | 2017 | SinisterHoodedFigure | Pokémon Emerald | |
