= Koji Kondo =

Japanese musician (born 1961)

- 近藤 浩治
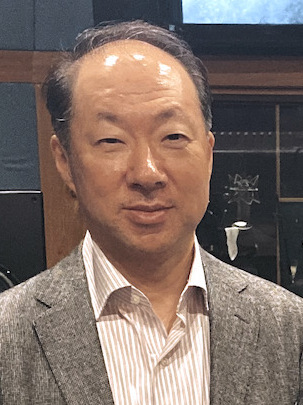
- Kondo in 2019
- Born: August 13, 1961 (age 65); Nagoya, Aichi, Japan
- Education: Osaka University of Arts
- Occupations: Composer; pianist; sound designer
- Years active: 1984–present
- Employer: Nintendo
- Musical career
- Genres: Video game music; chiptune
- Instrument: Piano

Koji Kondo (Japanese: 近藤 浩治, Hepburn: Kondō Kōji; born August 13, 1961) is a Japanese composer and senior executive at the video game company Nintendo. He is best known for his contributions for the Super Mario and The Legend of Zelda series, with his Super Mario Bros. theme being the first piece of music from a video game included in the American National Recording Registry. Kondo was hired by Nintendo in 1984 as its first dedicated composer and is currently a Senior Officer at its Entertainment Planning & Development division.

== Early life ==
Kondo was born in Nagoya, Japan, on August 13, 1961. Kondo began taking Yamaha Music classes from kindergarten, where he learned to play the electronic organ from the age of five. Kondo also played the marimba in his elementary school band. He later improved his skills with the electronic organ in a cover band that played jazz and rock music. Kondo studied at the Art Planning Department of Osaka University of Arts, but was never classically trained or academically dedicated to music.

With a love of arcade video games such as Space Invaders and the early Donkey Kong series, he said video games were the only place where he could find the kind of sound creation that he was looking for. He gained experience in composing, arranging pieces and computer programming through using the piano, and a computer to program music into the Famicom using Famicom BASIC.

== Career ==
Kondo applied for a music composition and sound programming job at Nintendo as a senior in 1984. He recalls, "I found my way to Nintendo by looking at the school's job placement board. You're supposed to apply to many different companies, but I saw the Nintendo ad, and had a love of making synthesizers, and loved games, and thought – that's the place for me. I interviewed with one company, Nintendo, and that's where I've been ever since." Kondo was the third person hired by Nintendo to create music and sound effects for its games, joining Hirokazu Tanaka and Yukio Kaneoka. However, he was the first at Nintendo to actually specialize in musical composition.

His first work at Nintendo was the audio design for the 1984 arcade game Punch-Out!!. As the Famicom had become popular in Japan, Kondo was assigned to compose music for the console's subsequent games at Nintendo's new development division, Nintendo Entertainment Analysis and Development (EAD). His second work at Nintendo was an instruction manual on how to program Japanese popular music into the Famicom using the peripheral Family BASIC. To conclude his first year at Nintendo, he created some of the music of Devil World, alongside Akito Nakatsuka. In 1985, Nintendo started marketing the Famicom abroad as the Nintendo Entertainment System (NES) to capitalize on the 1983 video game crash that had devastated Atari, Inc. and other companies. Super Mario Bros., released that year, was Kondo's first major score. The game's melodies were created with the intention that short segments of music could be endlessly repeated during the same gameplay without causing boredom. The main theme is iconic in popular culture and has been featured in more than 50 concerts, been a best-selling ringtone, and been remixed or sampled by various musicians.

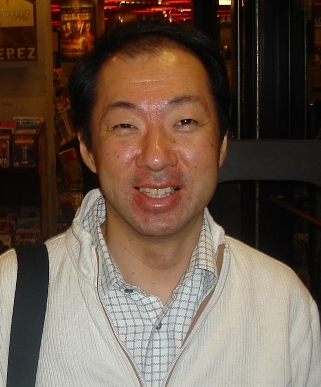
Kondo in 2006

Kondo's work on The Legend of Zelda scores has also become highly recognized. He produced four main pieces of background music for the first installment of the series; the overworld theme has become comparable in popularity with the Super Mario Bros. main theme. After the success of The Legend of Zelda, he provided the score for two Japanese-exclusive games, The Mysterious Murasame Castle (1986) and Shin Onigashima (1987). He created the soundtrack to Yume Kōjō: Doki Doki Panic (1987), which was later retooled for release outside Japan as Super Mario Bros. 2 in 1988.

Kondo returned to the Super Mario series to produce the scores to Super Mario Bros. 3 (1988) and the SNES launch title Super Mario World (1990). Koichi Sugiyama directed a jazz arrangement album of Super Mario World's music and oversaw its performance at the first Orchestral Game Musical Concert in 1991. After finishing the soundtrack to Super Mario World, Kondo was in charge of the sound programming for Pilotwings (1990), while also composing the "Helicopter Theme" for it, and created the sound effects for Star Fox (1993). In 1995, he composed for the sequel to Super Mario World, Yoshi's Island. Until the early 2000s, Kondo would usually write all compositions by himself on a project, with The Legend of Zelda: Ocarina of Time's being the last one Kondo worked on alone. Since then, he has been collaborating with other staff members at Nintendo, advising and supervising music created by others, as well as providing additional compositions for games, including Super Mario Galaxy, The Legend of Zelda: Spirit Tracks, The Legend of Zelda: Skyward Sword and Super Mario 3D World. Kondo also served as the lead composer of Super Mario Maker and Super Mario Maker 2. He was a consultant for the score to The Super Mario Bros. Movie (2023).

=== Works ===
Year	Title	Role(s)
1984	Punch-Out!!	Music, sound effects
1984	Golf	Sound effects
1984	Devil World	Music with Akito Nakatsuka
1985	Soccer	Music, sound effects
1985	Arm Wrestling	Music, sound effects
1985	Kung Fu	Sound effects
1985	Super Mario Bros.	Music, sound effects
1986	The Legend of Zelda	Music, sound effects
1986	The Mysterious Murasame Castle	Music, sound effects
1986	Super Mario Bros.: The Lost Levels	Music, sound effects
1986	Volleyball	Music, sound effects
1987	Yume Kōjō: Doki Doki Panic	Music, sound effects
1987	Shin Onigashima	Music, sound effects
1988	Super Mario Bros. 2	Music, sound effects
1988	Super Mario Bros. 3	Music, sound effects
1990	Super Mario World	Music, sound effects
1990	Pilotwings	Sound programmer; composed "Helicopter Theme"
1991	The Legend of Zelda: A Link to the Past	Music, sound effects
1993	Star Fox	Sound effects
1995	Yoshi's Island	Music, sound effects
1996	Super Mario 64	Music
1997	Star Fox 64	Music with Hajime Wakai
1998	The Legend of Zelda: Ocarina of Time	Music
2000	The Legend of Zelda: Majora's Mask	Music with Toru Minegishi
2002	Super Mario Sunshine	Music with Shinobu Tanaka
2002	The Legend of Zelda: The Wind Waker	Music with Kenta Nagata, Hajime Wakai, and Toru Minegishi
2004	The Legend of Zelda: Four Swords Adventures	Music with Asuka Hayazaki
2006	New Super Mario Bros.	"Overworld Theme"
2006	The Legend of Zelda: Twilight Princess	Music with Toru Minegishi and Asuka Hayazaki
2007	Super Mario Galaxy	Music with Mahito Yokota
2008	Super Smash Bros. Brawl	"Ground Theme (Super Mario Bros.)"
2009	The Legend of Zelda: Spirit Tracks	"Ending Theme"
2010	Super Mario Galaxy 2	Music with Mahito Yokota and Ryo Nagamatsu
2011	The Legend of Zelda: Skyward Sword	"An Ages-Old Tale"
2013	Super Mario 3D World	Music with Mahito Yokota, Toru Minegishi, and Yasuaki Iwata
2014	Super Smash Bros. for Wii U	"Super Mario Bros. Medley"
2015	Super Mario Maker	Music with Naoto Kubo and Asuka Hayazaki
2017	Super Mario Odyssey	Music with Shiho Fujii and Naoto Kubo
2018	Super Smash Bros. Ultimate	"King Bowser (Super Mario Bros. 3)"
2019	Super Mario Maker 2	Music with Atsuko Asahi, Toru Minegishi, and Sayako Doi
2023	Super Mario Bros. Wonder	Music with Shiho Fujii, Sayako Doi, and Chisaki Shimazu

== Musical style and influences ==
Kondo's music for Super Mario Bros. was designed around the feeling of motion that mirrors the player's physical experience. This followed the philosophy of series creator and designer Shigeru Miyamoto, who demanded that audio for the game be made "with substance" and synchronized with elements of the game. As a result, Kondo based most of the score around genres that are primarily used for dancing, such as Latin music and the waltz.

In the first The Legend of Zelda, Kondo juxtaposes the game's overworld theme with the theme that plays in dungeons. Kondo remarked on the importance of projecting distinct characters through music, so that players know almost immediately where they are within the game. Kondo used this contrast in other games, such as Super Mario Bros.

Kondo cited Deep Purple, Yes, Emerson, Lake & Palmer, Herbie Hancock, Chick Corea, Casiopea, and The Beatles as influences.

== Legacy and awards ==
Year	Nominee / work	Award	Result
2011	Super Mario Galaxy 2	British Academy Games Awards (Best Original Music)	Nominated
2014	Super Mario 3D World	British Academy Games Awards (Best Original Music)	Nominated
2014	Super Mario 3D World	Video Game Music Online (Best Soundtrack – Retro / Remixed)	Nominated

Kondo's work has been cited for allowing game music to transition from simple melodies to more complex orchestrations. Kondo attended the world premiere of Play! A Video Game Symphony at the Rosemont Theater in Chicago in May 2006, where his music from the Super Mario Bros. and The Legend of Zelda series was performed by a full symphony orchestra. Kondo also attended and performed in a series of three concerts celebrating the 25th anniversary of The Legend of Zelda series in late 2011. He performed piano with the American rock band Imagine Dragons at The Game Awards 2014 ceremony in December 2014. He was inducted into the Academy of Interactive Arts & Sciences' Hall of Fame in 2024.
