= Kaizo Mario World =

ROM hack series

- Gameplay from the first installment of Kaizo Mario World
- Developer: T. Takemoto
- Platform: Super Nintendo Entertainment System
- Release: 2007–2012
- Genre: Platformer
- Mode: Single-player

Kaizo Mario World, (Note: Japanese: 改造マリオワールド, Hepburn: Kaizō Mario Wārudo) also known as Asshole Mario, is a series of three ROM hacks of the Super Nintendo Entertainment System video game Super Mario World, created by T. Takemoto. The term "Kaizo Mario World" is a shortened form of the title Jisaku no Kaizō Mario (Super Mario World) o Yūjin ni Play Saseru. (Note: Japanese: 自作の改造マリオ（スーパーマリオワールド）を友人にプレイさせる, Hepburn: Jisaku no Kaizō Mario (Sūpā Mario Wārudo) o Yūjin ni Purei Saseru; "Making my friend play through my Mario hack (Super Mario World)") The series was created by Takemoto for his friend R. Kiba.

Kaizo Mario World features extremely difficult level designs on the Super Mario World engine. The series is notable for deliberately breaking all standard rules of "accepted" level design and introduced many staples of later Kaizo hacks, such as placing hidden blocks where the player is likely to jump, extremely fast autoscrollers, dying after the goal post, and various other traps. These cruelties and the resulting frustration, as well as the skill level required, are both the purpose of the hacks and the appeal of any Let's Play videos made of them.

== Gameplay ==
Kaizo Mario World consists of three side-scrolling platform games in which the player controls Mario or Luigi. Being ROM hacks of Super Mario World, the hacks use many of the same game mechanics while also introducing and forcing the use of glitches to make progress in a level. The hacks are notable for pushing the limits of human capability and feature many frame-perfect tricks, which usually require trial and error gameplay.

Each of the three ROM hacks starts by killing Mario during the opening cutscene unless the player performs a certain action.

== ROM hacks ==
Release timeline
2007	Kaizo Mario World
2008	Kaizo Mario World 2
2009
2010
2011
2012	Kaizo Mario World 3

Game	Year	System
Kaizo Mario World	2007	Super Nintendo
Kaizo Mario World 2	2008	Super Nintendo
Kaizo Mario World 3	2012	Super Nintendo

== Reception ==
The original Kaizo Mario World ranks as the 6th most downloaded Kaizo hack of all-time on SMW Central, the main repository for Super Mario World ROM hacking, with more than 85,000 downloads from the official repository. Kaizo Mario World 2 and 3 are less prominent, but still rank 100th and 89th on the same repository with more than 14,000 and 17,000 downloads, respectively.

In 2015, IGN stated about Kaizo Mario World – "It's funny, impressive, and extremely entertaining. Kaizo Mario wasn't the first mean Mario hack, but it was the most polished, and the first to understand that it's not just about being as hard as possible. Punishing players is an art form."

=== Legacy ===
The Japanese word "kaizō" (改造) simply refers to ROM hacking in the gaming industry, since its literal meaning is "reorganize," "restructure," or "reconstruct," but Kaizo Mario World's prominence means that other ROM hacks have used this term to indicate an extreme level of difficulty, such as Kaizo Mario Bros. 3, Kaizo Mario 64, SMG2 The Kaizo Green Stars by Evanbowl, and the Kaizo Caverns Minecraft map in Vechs's Super Hostile map series. This has led to the term "Kaizo Hack" defining a ROM hack of any game intended to be extremely difficult or unfair, intended to push the difficulty to the limits of human capabilities. Several of these have been featured live, both in races and in individual speedruns, at Games Done Quick events.

SMW Central, which maintains the most updated repository of Super Mario World ROM hacks, categorizes Kaizo into five categories. "Kaizo: Beginner," "Kaizo: Intermediate," and "Kaizo: Expert" are intended for ROM hacks in the Kaizo Mario World style that, while varying in relative difficulty, are all intended to be beaten by players in real-time without tool assistance, such as savestates or slowdown, necessary. "Tool-Assisted: Kaizo" ROM hacks are designed to be at the extreme limit of human capability, and are made with the intent that the player use tools as needed to make progress. Excessively hard hacks, such as the Item Abuse series, that far exceed human capabilities and are intended to be a specific challenge for tool-assisted speedrunners and theorycrafters, are categorized as "Tool-Assisted: Pit."

Kaizo Mario World has also been the inspiration for many levels created within Super Mario Maker. Two of the most notable are levels created by PangaeaPanga titled Pit of Panga: P Break and U-Break, the latter of which was recognized in 2018 by the Guinness Book of World Records as the most difficult level created in Super Mario Maker.

== See also ==
- List of unofficial Mario media
- Kaizo § Super Mario Maker
