= Super Mario 64 Coop Deluxe =

- Developer: Community Project
- Publisher: Community Project
- Series: Super Mario
- Platforms: Microsoft Windows, Linux, macOS, SteamOS, Android, iOS, iPadOS
- Release: July 1, 2024; 2 years ago
- Mode: Multiplayer

Super Mario 64 Coop Deluxe (sm64coopdx) is a source-available mod for the fan-made Super Mario 64 PC port. The mod restructures the original game to support online cooperative gameplay for up to 16 players, who can play through the campaign together. It adds playable characters, each with unique abilities, and introduces modern features and extensive customization options.

The project is a community-driven continuation of an earlier mod, sm64ex-coop.

== Development ==
Super Mario 64 Coop Deluxe is developed by the Coop Deluxe Team and is built upon the Super Mario 64 PC port, a reverse engineering project created by the fan community. The project's origins lie in the sm64ex-coop mod. The Coop Deluxe Team was formed when the developers of sm64ex-coop and a separate, more feature-heavy fork of the mod decided to merge their efforts into a single, unified project.

Version 1.0 of the mod was released on July 2, 2024, announced with a trailer showcasing its features.

=== Legal status ===
As a mod for the reverse-engineered PC port, sm64coopdx exists in a legal gray area. The source code of the PC port itself does not contain any of Nintendo's original copyrighted assets. To play the mod, users must legally obtain a ROM image of the original Super Mario 64 and use it to compile the game themselves. The developers of sm64coopdx do not distribute the ROM or any compiled versions of the game containing Nintendo's assets.

== Background ==
The desire for a multiplayer mode in Super Mario 64 has been a long-standing point of discussion among fans since the game's original 1996 release. With the 2004 remake, Super Mario 64 DS, the game received multiplayer features. Some users criticised this, as it was more of a "versus mode" than a full story mode gameplay. On September 29, 2017, a Super Mario 64 mod called "Net64+" launched, which allowed users to play Super Mario 64 online on an emulator like Project64. It allowed people to play as Mario, Luigi, Wario, Waluigi, Yoshi, Princess Peach, Daisy, Rosalina and Toad. The mod was able to handle 24 players on one server.

== Gameplay ==
An image of players playing the MarioHunt mod

The mod transforms Super Mario 64 from a single-player game into a cooperative multiplayer one. It operates on a client–server model, allowing players to host or join game lobbies. Progress is synchronized across all players; for example, when one player collects a Power Star, it is counted for everyone in the lobby. The game world's state, including enemies, objects, and puzzles, is synchronized. It allows for custom color codes, meaning that the color of characters appearance can be altered.

=== Playable characters ===
While the original game only featured Mario, sm64coopdx includes a roster of characters from the wider Mario franchise, which all use the same playstyle. In addition to Mario, playable characters include Luigi, Toad, Wario and Waluigi. Custom characters can be created through modding, with DynOS and Lua.

== Features ==
The mod integrates several modern and quality-of-life features into the game.

=== Customization and modding ===
A significant aspect of sm64coopdx is its extensibility through a Lua scripting API. This allows the community to create and share their own modifications, which can be loaded into the game. Customizations range from cosmetic changes, like character outfits, to new game modes. One example created by the community is a "Prop Hunt" mode, where one team disguises themselves as objects within a level while the other team hunts them. Other community mods have introduced features like a day-night cycle, enhanced graphical effects, and additional custom characters.

=== Quality-of-life improvements ===
sm64coopdx includes an updated user interface designed for multiplayer, featuring a player list and chat functionality.

== Reception ==
Super Mario 64 Coop Deluxe has been positively received by gaming news outlets. Kaan Serin of GamesRadar+ called the mod's existence "a genuine miracle of reverse-engineering and fan dedication." The mod has gained attention for its technical achievement in converting a 3D single-player platformer into a fully functional online cooperative game.
