= Super Mario 64 =

1996 video game

- North American cover art
- Developer: Nintendo EAD
- Publisher: Nintendo
- Director: Shigeru Miyamoto
- Producer: Shigeru Miyamoto
- Designers: Yoichi Yamada; Yasuhisa Yamamura; Takashi Tezuka; Kenta Usui; Naoki Mori; Yoshiki Haruhana; Makoto Miyanaga; Katsuhiko Kanno
- Programmers: Yasunari Nishida; Yoshinori Tanimoto; Hajime Yajima; Daiki Iwamoto; Toshio Iwawaki; Takumi Kawagoe; Giles Goddard
- Artists: Shigefumi Hino; Hisashi Nogami; Yoshiaki Koizumi; Hideki Fujii; Satoru Takizawa; Masanao Arimoto; Tomoaki Kuroume; Yusuke Nakano; Yōichi Kotabe
- Writer: Leslie Swan
- Composer: Koji Kondo
- Series: Super Mario
- Platforms: Nintendo 64; iQue Player
- Release: Nintendo 64: JP: June 23, 1996; NA: September 29, 1996; PAL: March 1, 1997; iQue Player: CHN: November 18, 2003
- Genres: Platform, action-adventure
- Mode: Single-player

Japanese name
- Kana: スーパーマリオ64
Transcriptions
- Romanization: Sūpā Mario 64

Super Mario 64 (Note: Japanese: スーパーマリオ64, Hepburn: Sūpā Mario 64) is a 1996 platform game developed and published by Nintendo for the Nintendo 64. It is the first Super Mario game to feature 3D graphics, combining traditional Super Mario gameplay, visual style, and characters in a large open world. In the game, Bowser invades Princess Peach's castle, kidnaps her, and hides the castle's Power Stars in different worlds inside magical paintings. As the player character, Mario, the player traverses levels and collects Power Stars to unlock areas of the castle, reach Bowser and rescue Peach.

Director Shigeru Miyamoto conceived a 3D Super Mario game during the production of Star Fox (1993). The team spent about one year on design and twenty months on production, starting with the virtual camera system. The team continued with illustrating the 3D character models and refining sprite movements. Yoji Inagaki recorded the sound effects, and the score was composed by Koji Kondo.

Super Mario 64 was highly anticipated, boosted by advertising campaigns and showings at the 1996 E3 trade show. It was released in Japan and North America in 1996 and PAL regions in 1997 to acclaim, with reviewers praising its ambition, visuals, level design, and gameplay; however, some criticized its camera system. It is the best-selling Nintendo 64 game, with nearly twelve million copies sold by 2015.

Super Mario 64 is widely considered to be one of the greatest and most influential video games of all time. Numerous developers have cited it as an influence on 3D platform games, with its camera system and 360-degree analog control establishing a new archetype, much as Super Mario Bros. did for side-scrolling platform games. Its influence can be seen in 3D platformers such as Spyro the Dragon, Banjo-Kazooie, and Psychonauts. It was remade as Super Mario 64 DS for the Nintendo DS in 2004, and has been ported to other Nintendo consoles. The game has produced many fangames and mods, a large speedrunning community, and enduring rumors about its features and development.

== Gameplay ==
=== Controls ===
From left to right clockwise, the interface shows the number of extra lives, health points remaining, coins obtained, Power Stars collected throughout the game, and the camera configuration. The three screenshots show the camera automatically rotating to show the path.

Super Mario 64 has been described as a 3D platformer and action-adventure game in which the player controls the titular player character, Mario, through various courses. Mario's abilities are far more diverse than in previous games. He can walk, run, jump, crouch, crawl, climb, swim, kick, grab objects, and punch using the game controller's analog stick and buttons. He can execute special jumps by combining a regular jump with other actions, including the double and triple jumps, long jump, backflip, and wall jump. The player can adjust the camera—operated by a Lakitu broadcasting Mario—and toggle between first-person and third-person view.

=== Health, lives, and power-ups ===
Unlike many of its predecessors, Super Mario 64 uses a health point system, represented by a pie shape consisting of eight segments. If Mario has taken damage, he can replenish his health either by collecting three types of coins—yellow, which replenishes one segment; red, equal to two yellow coins and which replenishes two segments; and blue, equal to five yellow coins and which replenishes five segments, by walking through a spinning heart or by jumping into water. Underwater, Mario's health instead represents how long he can hold his breath, slowly diminishing while underwater and replenishing when he surfaces. Finishing a course grants Mario an extra life for every 50 yellow coins the player collected, and extra life mushrooms are hidden in various places such as trees and poles—they may either chase Mario through the air or fall to the ground, avoiding Mario and disappear shortly if not collected.

In absence of the power-ups normally found in previous games, such as the Super Mushroom and Fire Flower, three colors of translucent blocks—red, green, and blue—appear throughout many stages. Three switches of the same colors, found in three secret areas located in either stages or the castle itself, turn their corresponding blocks solid and permanently allow Mario to obtain three types of special cap power-ups throughout all of the stages. The Wing Cap allows Mario to fly after doing a triple jump or being shot from a cannon; the Metal Cap makes him immune to enemies, fire, noxious gases, allows him to withstand wind and water currents, perform on-land moves underwater, and have unlimited air capacity underwater; and the Vanish Cap renders him partially immaterial and invulnerable, and allows him to walk through some obstacles. Another implicit powerup is the shell remains after stomping a Koopa Troopa, which Mario can use to run over enemies, and surf on water, lava, and quicksand.

=== Setting and objective ===
Power Stars are obtainable by completing certain objectives.

The hub world is set in Princess Peach's Castle, which consists of three floors consisting of the castle's lobby, the main tower, and a basement, plus a moat and a courtyard outside the castle. The player's main objective is to look for paintings that, when jumped into, bring them into courses containing Power Stars, which upon their collection unlock more of the castle hub world. Each of the fifteen courses has seven Power Stars (six from named missions and one gained by collecting 100 coins in the level), and an additional fifteen are hidden as secrets and as bonuses, for a total of 120 Power Stars.

The courses are filled with enemies as well as friendly creatures that provide assistance or ask favors, such as Bob-omb Buddies, who will allow Mario to access cannons on request. Some Power Stars only appear after completing certain tasks, often hinted at by the name of the course. These challenges include collecting one hundred yellow coins or eight red coins on a stage, defeating a boss, racing an opponent, and solving puzzles. The final level is blocked by "endless stairs" similar to the Penrose stairs concept, but Mario can ascend them after collecting seventy Power Stars. The music in the endless stairs before collecting seventy Power Stars resembles a Shepard scale. There are many hidden mini-courses and other secrets within the castle, which may contain extra Power Stars required for the full completion. If the player collects all 120 Power Stars, Yoshi can be found on the roof of Princess Peach's Castle, who will give the player a message from the developers, accompanied by one hundred extra lives and an improved triple jump.

== Plot ==
Princess Peach invites Mario to come to her castle for a cake she has baked for him. When he arrives, Mario discovers that Bowser has invaded the castle and imprisoned the princess and her servants within its walls using the power of the castle's 120 Power Stars. The Power Stars are hidden in the castle's paintings, which serve as portals to other worlds where Bowser's minions keep watch over the Stars. Mario explores the castle and enters these worlds, gaining access to more rooms as he recovers more Stars. Mario unlocks three doors to different floors of the castle with keys obtained by defeating Bowser in hidden worlds. After getting at least 70 of the 120 Stars, Mario breaks the curse of the endless stairs that block the entrance to Bowser's final hiding place. After Mario defeats Bowser in the final battle, and Bowser escapes, swearing revenge, he obtains a special Power Star which gives him the Wing Cap, and he flies back to the castle's courtyard. Peach is released from the stained-glass window above the castle's entrance, and she rewards Mario by kissing him on the nose and baking the cake that she had promised him.

Once Mario earns all 120 stars, he is able to access the roof of the castle via a cannon on the castle grounds, where Yoshi awaits him. Yoshi congratulates Mario on securing all 120 stars and grants him 100 extra lives to continue playing.

== Development ==
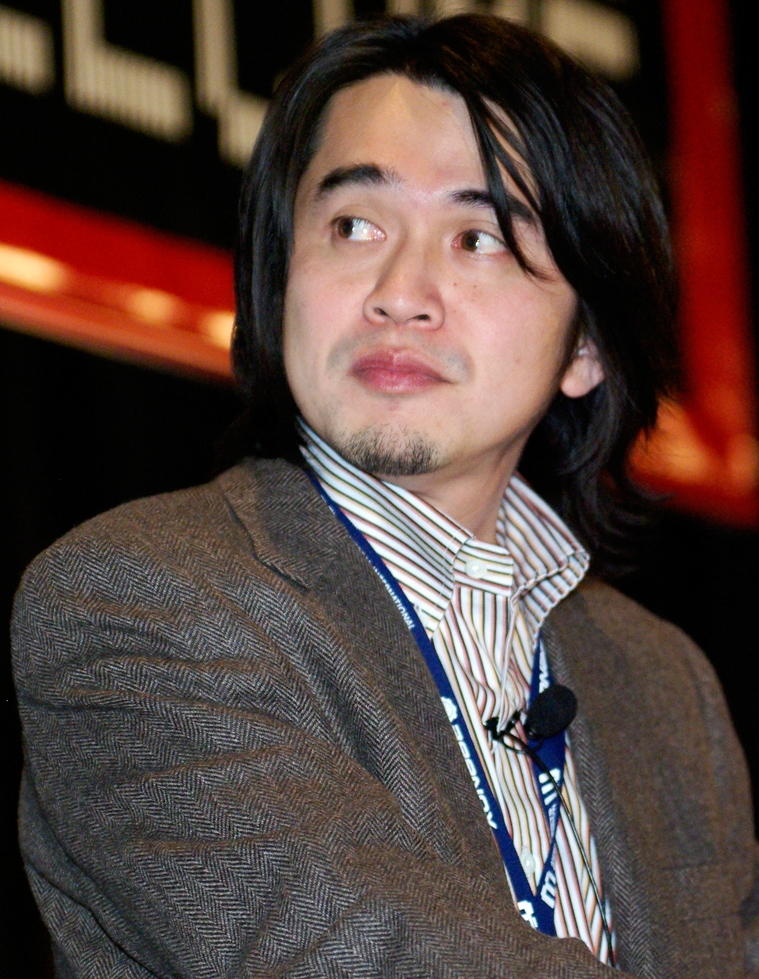
Director Shigeru Miyamoto (left) and assistant director Yoshiaki Koizumi (right)

In the early 1990s, Super Mario creator Shigeru Miyamoto conceived a 3D Mario design while developing the game Star Fox (1993) for the Super Nintendo Entertainment System. Star Fox used the Super FX graphics chip, which added more processing power; Miyamoto considered using the chip to develop a Super NES game, Super Mario FX, with gameplay based on "an entire world in miniature, like miniature trains". According to engineer Dylan Cuthbert, who worked on Star Fox, Super Mario FX was not a game but the codename of the Super FX chip. Miyamoto reformulated the idea for the Nintendo 64, not for its greater power but because its controller has more buttons for gameplay. At the January 1993 Consumer Electronics Show (CES), where Star Fox made its debut, Nintendo's booth demonstrated a talking 3D polygon animation of Mario's head; this later inspired the creation of the interactive Mario face in the title screen, which was programmed by Giles Goddard.

Production of Super Mario 64 began on September 7, 1994, at Nintendo's Entertainment Analysis & Development division, and concluded on May 20, 1996. According to Miyamoto, the development team consisted of around fifteen to twenty people. Development began with the characters and the camera system; months were spent selecting a view and layout. The camera was programmed by Takumi Kawagoe, who applied what he had learned from working on the camera and cutscenes in Star Fox 2. The original concept involved the fixed path of an isometric game such as Super Mario RPG, which moved to a free-roaming 3D design, with some linear paths, particularly to coerce the player into Bowser's lair, according to Giles Goddard.

"There [were] no jumping actions in 3-D we could reference at the time, so we shared in the enjoyment of going through all the trial and error with Mr. Miyamoto and other team members. It was arguably tough work, but that feeling was overtaken by the joy of innovating in a new field."

— Yoshiaki Koizumi, 2020 The Washington Post, interview

Super Mario 64 is one of the first games for which Nintendo produced its illustrations internally instead of by outsourcing. The graphics were made using N-World, a Silicon Graphics (SGI)-based toolkit. The development team prioritized Mario's movement and, before levels were created, tested and refined Mario's animations on a simple grid. The 3D illustrations were created by Shigefumi Hino, Hisashi Nogami, Hideki Fujii, Tomoaki Kuroume, and Yusuke Nakano, and the game was animated by co-director Yoshiaki Koizumi and Satoru Takiwaza. Yōichi Kotabe, illustrator and character designer for the Mario series, made a 3D drawing of Mario from various angles and directed the creation of the character models. In an interview with The Washington Post, Yoshiaki Koizumi recalled that his challenge was animating the 3D models without any precedents. To assist players with depth perception, the team positioned a faux shadow directly beneath each object regardless of the area's lighting. Yoshiaki Koizumi described the feature as an "iron-clad necessity" which "might not be realistic, but it's much easier to play".

Miyamoto's guiding design philosophy was to include more details than earlier games by using the Nintendo 64's power to feature "all the emotions of the characters". He likened the style to a 3D interactive cartoon. Mario was made highly expressive to "create the feeling of controlling something that's really alive", which Miyamoto was inspired to do after letting his pet hamster loose in his room. Some details were inspired by the developers' personal lives; for example, the Boos are based on assistant director Takashi Tezuka's wife, who, as Miyamoto explained, "is very quiet normally, but one day she exploded, maddened by all the time Tezuka spent at work".

Super Mario 64 was first run on an SGI Onyx emulator, which only emulated the console's application programming interface and not its hardware. The first test scenario for controls and physics involved Mario interacting with a golden rabbit, named "MIPS" after the Nintendo 64's MIPS architecture processors; the rabbit was included in the final game as a Power Star holder. Super Mario 64 features more puzzles than earlier Mario games. It was developed simultaneously with The Legend of Zelda: Ocarina of Time but, as Ocarina of Time was released more than two years later, some puzzles were taken for Super Mario 64. The developers tried to include a multiplayer cooperative mode, whereby players would control Mario and his brother Luigi in split-screen. Nevertheless, hardware constraints and the developers' inability to implement the mode satisfactorily led to its removal.

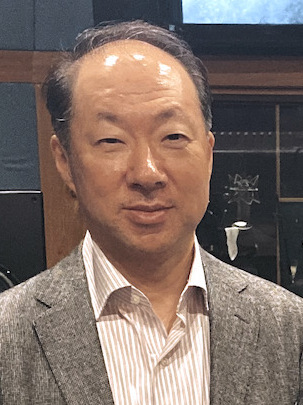
Composer Koji Kondo

The music was composed by veteran composer Koji Kondo, who created new interpretations of the familiar melodies from earlier media as well as new material. Yoji Inagaki was responsible for the sound design, tasked with producing hundreds of sound effects. He and Kondo felt that music and sound effects were equally important. According to Inagaki, the average Nintendo 64 game had about 500 sound effects, and made comparisons to Ocarina of Time, with 1,200, and The Legend of Zelda: Majora's Mask, with 2,000. Software Creations was brought in to handle audio programming by Nintendo using the N64 Sound Tools sound system, which was one of the Dream Team members and became the standard sound driver used for the Nintendo 64.

Super Mario 64 is one of the first games to feature Charles Martinet as the voice of Mario, and Leslie Swan—then senior editor of Nintendo Power and English localizer for Super Mario 64—as the voice of Princess Peach.

== Release ==
Super Mario 64 was first shown as a playable prototype in November 1995 at Nintendo Space World. This version was only fifty percent complete, and only about two percent of texture mapping was finished. It featured thirty-two courses. Miyamoto had hoped to create more, possibly up to forty, but was ultimately reduced to fifteen. According to Nintendo of America chairman Howard Lincoln, Miyamoto's desire to add more was a major factor in the decision to delay the Nintendo 64 release from Christmas 1995 to Summer 1996. Nintendo president Hiroshi Yamauchi later said: "Game creators can finish games quickly if they compromise. But users have sharp eyes. They soon know if the games are compromised. [Miyamoto] asked for two more months and I gave them to him unconditionally". The game was later shown at E3 1996 with multiple Nintendo 64s set up for people to play. According to Giles Goddard, the stress of the project caused some programmers to quit or move to different departments.

=== Advertising and sales ===
Peter Main, Nintendo's vice president of marketing at the time, stated Super Mario 64 was meant as the killer app for the Nintendo 64. The US$20 million (Note: equivalent to $41,056,652 in 2025) marketing campaign included videotapes sent to more than five hundred thousand Nintendo Power subscribers and advertisements shown on MTV, Fox, and Nickelodeon.

Super Mario 64 was officially released in Japan in June 1996, North America in September, and in Europe and Australia in March 1997. During its first week of sale, it sold around 200,000 copies. During its first three months of sale in North America, it sold more than two million copies and grossed $140 million (Note: equivalent to $287,396,563 in 2025) in the United States, becoming the best-selling video game of 1996 by dollar sales. During the first three months of 1997, it was the second-best-selling console game at 523,000 units, behind Mario Kart 64. According to the NPD Group, it was the fifth best-selling video game of 1998 by unit sales, behind GoldenEye 007, The Legend of Zelda: Ocarina of Time, Gran Turismo, and Banjo-Kazooie. By early 2001, it had sold 5.5 million units, and 5.9 million by September 2002.

At the 1999 Milia festival in Cannes, Super Mario 64 won a Gold ECCSELL prize for earning revenues above €21 million (Note: equivalent to $32,324,457 in 2025) in the European Union in 1998. It had become the second most popular game on Wii's Virtual Console by June 2007, behind Super Mario Bros. By March 2008, Super Mario 64 sold 11.8 million copies worldwide, being the best-selling Nintendo 64 game. By 2015, Super Mario 64 was the 12th most sold Mario game, with 11.91 million copies sold.

=== Re-releases ===
==== Super Mario 64 DS ====
An enhanced remake, Super Mario 64 DS, was released for the Nintendo DS in 2004. As with the original, the plot centers on collecting Power Stars and rescuing Princess Peach from Bowser. In contrast with the original, Yoshi is the starting character, with Mario, Luigi, and Wario as unlockable characters. It features improved graphics, slightly altered courses, new areas, powerups, and enemies, more Power Stars to collect, touchscreen mini-games, and a multiplayer mode. Reviews were mostly positive, with critics praising the graphics and add-ons to the original game but criticizing the controls and multiplayer mode. By September 2021, 11.06 million copies had been sold worldwide.

==== Other re-releases ====
A version of Super Mario 64 was used as a tech demo for the Nintendo 64 Disk Drive (64DD) floppy drive at the 1996 Nintendo Space World trade show. Like Wave Race 64, Super Mario 64 was re-released in Japan on July 18, 1997 as Super Mario 64 Rumble Pak Version (Note: スーパーマリオ64 振動パック対応バージョン (Sūpā Mario 64 shindō pakku taiō bājion) (lit. 'Super Mario 64 Vibration Pack Compatible Version'); often referred to as the Shindou version in English-speaking circles) which fixed various bugs, added support for the Rumble Pak peripheral, included the voice acting from the English version, among other changes.

In November 2003, it was ported to China's iQue Player as a limited-release demo. In late 2006, it was released on the Wii Virtual Console service which added enhanced resolution and compatibility with the GameCube and Super Famicom Classic controllers. In September 2020, Super Mario 64 was one of the three Super Mario games to be included in the Super Mario 3D All-Stars collection on Nintendo Switch. This version was based on the Rumble Pak iteration, and updated the presentation to display at 720p resolution in both the Switch's docked and handheld configurations, in addition to using upscaled user interface assets and textures. It also features a new control scheme that accommodates the wider button array of the Nintendo Switch Joy-Con and Pro Controller, and was later patched to add compatibility for the Nintendo 64 controller used with the Nintendo Classics service. It made another Nintendo Switch appearance in October 2021 as part of the Nintendo 64 lineup for the Nintendo Classics service.

== Reception ==
=== Critical reviews ===
Reception

Aggregate scores
Aggregator	Score
GameRankings	96%
Metacritic	94/100

Review scores
Publication	Score
AllGame	5/5
Computer and Video Games	5/5
Electronic Gaming Monthly	9.5/10, 9.5/10, 9.5/10, 9.5/10
EP Daily	10/10
Famitsu	10/10, 10/10, 10/10, 9/10
Game Informer	9.75/10 (1996), 9/10 (2007)
GameFan	100/100, 100/100, 100/100, 100/100
GamePro	5/5
GameRevolution	B+
GameSpot	9.4/10 (N64), 8/10 (Wii)
Hyper	95%
IGN	9.8/10
N64 Magazine	96%
Next Generation	5/5
Nintendo Life	10/10
Official Nintendo Magazine	95%
Total!	100/100
Digitiser	96%
Maximum	5/5

Super Mario 64 received enthusiastic pre-release reception. GamePro commented on the 1995 prototype's smoothness, and how the action "was a blast", despite it being only fifty percent complete. Ed Semrad of Electronic Gaming Monthly agreed, praising the new 3D animation of Mario characters shown in only 2D before. Larry Marcus, a source analyst for Alex. Brown & Sons, recalls Super Mario 64 being the most anticipated game of E3 1996, remembering a field of teenagers "jostling for a test run".

Super Mario 64 received critical acclaim, with a score of 94 out of 100 from review aggregator website Metacritic based on thirteen reviews, and a score of 96% from review aggregator GameRankings, which ranked it the eighteenth best video game of all time based on twenty-two reviews.

The design, variety of controls and use of 3D gameplay received praise from video game publications. Maximum found its strongest points were the sense of freedom and its replayability, comparing it to Super Mario World and citing its similar gimmick of allowing access to new areas upon finding switches. One of GameFan's four reviewers, E. Storm, cited the water levels as "overjoy[ing]" and showed how Super Mario 64 delved into an "entirely new realm of gaming". Official Nintendo Magazine called it "beautiful in both looks and design". Doug Perry of IGN agreed that it transitioned the series to 3D perfectly. Electronic Gaming Monthly discussed the levels in their initial review, praising them for their size and challenge, and later ranked it the fourth best console game of all time, arguing that it had breached the entire genre of 3D gaming while working virtually flawlessly.

Computer and Video Games editor Paul Davies praised the 3D environment, and said that it enhanced the interaction, and described the control scheme as intuitive and versatile. Total! hailed the gameplay as imaginative and having such variety that their reviewers were still "hooked" after one month. Writing for AllGame, Jonti Davies commented on the diversity of the gameplay and the abundance of activities found in each course. Nintendo Life's Corbie Dillard agreed, calling the variety the game's "greatest genius". Writing for GameRevolution, Nebojsa Radakovic described Super Mario 64 as one of the few "true" 3D platform games. N64 Magazine likened it to an enormous playground which was a pleasure to experiment in, but opined that the exploration element was slightly brought down by how many hints and tips there were. Victor Lucas of EP Daily agreed, praising the freedom, but suggesting players "skip all the sign posts".

Super Mario 64 also received praise for its graphics. Chris Hudak of VideoGameSpot praised the graphics for being "clean yet simple" and not detracting from the details of the game world. GamePro particularly praised the combination of unprecedented technical performance and art design, calling it "the most visually impressive game of all time". Paul Davies described the graphics as "so amazing to see, you find yourself stopping to admire [them]". Jonti Davies called the visuals phenomenal, and the frame rate respectable. Doug Perry found the graphics simple but magnificent, a sentiment shared by Next Generation. Hyper reviewer Nino Alegeropoulos called it the best-looking console game to date and opined that its high resolution and frame rate for the time made it look "infinitely better than a cartoon". Total! said that the graphics' lack of pixellation and jagged edges made it look like they were from a "top of the range graphics workstation".

The camera system received mixed reviews. Next Generation found that Super Mario 64 was less accessible than previous Mario games, frustrated by the camera's occasional erratic movements and lack of optimal angle. Nebojsa Radakovic and Doug Perry added that the camera was sometimes blocked by or went through objects. Electronic Gaming Monthly's Dan Hsu, Shawn Smith, and Crispin Boyer all removed half a point from their scores, claiming that the camera sometimes could not move to a wanted angle or rapidly shifted in an undesirable manner, a criticism that returned in Electronic Gaming Monthly's 100 Best Games of All Time list. Game Informer stated in their 2007 re-review by present-day standards the camera "would almost be considered broken". Nintendo Power also noted the learning curve of the shifting camera. In contrast, Corbie Dillard claimed that the camera did not have any problems, and that it succeeded at helping the player traverse complex environments. This sentiment was shared by Total!, claiming that there were very few occasions where the camera was at a suboptimal angle. Paul Davies acknowledged that he was critical of the camera, saying that in some occasions it was difficult to position ideally, but ultimately dismissed it as "one hiccup" of a "revolutionary" game.

=== Awards ===
Super Mario 64 won numerous awards, including various "Game of the Year" honors by members of the gaming media, and in Nintendo's own best-selling Player's Choice selection. It has been placed high on "the greatest games of all time" lists by many reviewers, including IGN, Game Informer, Edge, Official Nintendo Magazine, Electronic Gaming Monthly, and Nintendo Power. Electronic Gaming Monthly awarded it a Gold award in its initial review, and it won Electronic Gaming Monthly's Game of the Year for both editors' pick and readers' pick, and Nintendo 64 Game of the Year, Adventure Game of the Year, and Best Graphics. At the 1997 Computer Game Developers Conference, it was given Spotlight Awards for Best Use of Innovative Technology, Best Console Game, and Best Game of 1996. Maximum gave it a "Maximum Game of the Month Award" before its international release, ranking it the greatest game the magazine had ever reviewed. Digitiser ranked it the best game of 1997, above Final Fantasy VII as runner-up.

List of awards
Date	Award publication	Category	Result	Ref.
1996	Maximum	Game of the Month (June)	Won	
1996	Electronic Gaming Monthly	Game of the Month (September)	Won	
1996	Electronic Gaming Monthly	Gold Award	Won	
1996	Electronic Gaming Monthly	Nintendo 64 Game of the Year	Won	
1996	Electronic Gaming Monthly	Adventure Game of the Year	Won	
1996	Electronic Gaming Monthly	Best Graphics	Won	
1996	Electronic Gaming Monthly	Game of the Year	Won	
1996	Game Informer	Game of the Year	Won	
1996	Spotlight Awards	Game of the Year	Won	
1996	Spotlight Awards	Best Use of Innovative Technology	Won	
1996	Spotlight Awards	Best Console Game	Won	
1997	Digitiser	Game of the Year	Won	
1997	Computer and Video Games	Game of the Year	Won	
1997	Golden Joystick Awards	Game of the Year	Won	
1997	Golden Joystick Awards	Best Looking Game	Won	
1997	Official Nintendo Magazine	Best Nintendo 64 Game	Won	
1998	ECCSELL Awards	Gold Award	Won	

== Legacy ==
[...] if the gaming press was to be believed, Super Mario 64 was going to be the greatest game ever released anywhere, and it might also cure cancer and feed the world's starving children.

The rule that a console must have a broad spectrum of launch titles to appeal to the North American audience was generally true, but Nintendo found the exception: a single amazing title, with well-implemented 3D gameplay that most console players had never experienced, could bear the weight of the entire system on its shoulders.

— Lee Hutchinson of Ars Technica in 2013

Super Mario 64 was key to the early success of and anticipation for the Nintendo 64. Lee Hutchinson, a former Babbage's employee, notes how it was spurred by a feverish video game press, and how the success defied the rule that a wide variety of launch games was necessary for broad appeal. Eventually, the Nintendo 64 lost much of its market share to Sony's PlayStation, partly due to its cartridge and controller design decisions, which were reportedly implemented by Miyamoto for Super Mario 64.

In 2012, Super Mario 64 was among the 80 entries in the Smithsonian American Art Museum's The Art of Video Games exhibit.

=== Influence ===
Super Mario 64 set many precedents for 3D platformers as one of the most influential video games. The game is known for its nonlinear, open freedom, which has been acclaimed by video game developers and journalists. 1Up.com wrote about its central hub world, which provides a safe tutorial and a level selector, and is now a staple of the 3D platformer genre. As the genre evolved, many of the series's conventions were rethought drastically, placing emphasis on exploration over traditional platform jumping, or "hop and bop" action. Though some disputed its quality, others argued that it established an entirely new genre for the series. Its mission-based level design inspired game designers such as GoldenEye 007 (1997) producer and director Martin Hollis and the development team of Tony Hawk's Pro Skater. Dan Houser, a prominent figure in the development of the Grand Theft Auto series, stated, "Anyone who makes 3D games who says they've not borrowed something from Mario or Zelda [of the Nintendo 64] is lying". Tom Hall, co-founder of id Software, said it "defined the 3D platformer as a genre", and that "the industry hadn't really figured out 3D platforming yet, and here it was, a masterwork that set the standard". Square Enix has stated that a coincidental meeting with Disney employees resulted in the creation of the Kingdom Hearts series, inspired by Super Mario 64's use of 3D environments and exploration. Michael John, designer and producer on Spyro the Dragon, cited Super Mario 64's controls and environmental design as influences. Tim Schafer, founder of Double Fine, cited the game as "the biggest single influence" in developing Psychonauts. Chris Sutherland, who served as the lead designer for Banjo-Kazooie, agreed that Super Mario 64 set the benchmark for 3D platformers and claimed that any other game in the genre on the Nintendo 64 would inevitably be compared with Super Mario 64. Gabe Newell of Valve Corporation cited Super Mario 64 as an inspiration for Half-Life, with aspects such as "having spaces that can be traversed multiple times and still be fun to a much less punitive method of handling player failure." Assassin's Creed IV: Black Flag director Ashraf Ismail based the open world design on Super Mario 64's hub world with pockets of maps full of content.

Super Mario 64 introduced a free-floating camera that can be controlled independently of the character. To increase freedom of exploration and fluid control in a 3D world, Super Mario 64 designers created a dynamic virtual video camera that turns and accelerates according to the character's actions. This camera system became the standard for 3D platformers. Nintendo Power praised the camera movements along with The Legend of Zelda: Ocarina of Time's addition of the lock-on camera and concluded that the two games were trailblazers for the 3D era. PC Magazine's K. Thor Jensen considers Super Mario 64 to be the first truly realized 3D platformer with the integration of camera control into its core gameplay, which he called the medium's true evolutionary leap.

Super Mario 64's use of the analog stick was novel, offering more precise and wide-ranging character movements than the digital D-pads of other consoles. At the time, 3D games generally only allowed the player to either control the character in relation to a fixed camera angle or in relation to the character's perspective. Super Mario 64's controls, in contrast, are fully analog and interpret a 360-degree range of motion into navigation through a 3D space relative to the camera. The analog stick allows for precise control over subtleties such as running speed. In 2005, Electronic Gaming Monthly ranked Super Mario 64 the most important game since they began publication in 1989, stating that, while there were 3D games before it, "Nintendo's was the first to get the control scheme right". In 2009, Guinness World Records ranked the game at number 11 on their list of the top 50 console games of all time based on initial impact and lasting legacy.

In July 2021, a pristine, sealed copy of Super Mario 64 was auctioned for $1,560,000, the largest amount ever paid for a video game. Heritage Auctions's video games specialist said, "It seems impossible to overstate the importance of this title, not only to the history of Mario and Nintendo but to video games as a whole".

=== Successors ===
A sequel was planned for the disk drive add-on, under the codename Super Mario 128. In July 1996, Nintendo insiders stated that Miyamoto was assembling a team consisting mostly of developers who had worked on Super Mario 64. Miyamoto affirmed that work on the sequel had only commenced at the time of the E3 1997 convention. The project was canceled due to its lack of progress and the commercial failure of the Nintendo 64 Disk Drive.

Super Mario 64 successors include Super Mario Sunshine for the GameCube and Super Mario Galaxy for the Wii, building on its core design of power-ups and its 3D, open-ended gameplay. Super Mario Galaxy 2 includes a remake of Super Mario 64's Whomp's Fortress level called Throwback Galaxy. Super Mario 3D Land and Super Mario 3D World are departures from the open-ended design, instead focused on platforming reminiscent of 2D games.

The Nintendo Switch game Super Mario Odyssey returns to Super Mario 64's open design; it includes numerous references to the latter. The "Mario 64 Suit" and "Mario 64 Cap", which change Mario's appearance to his in Super Mario 64, can be purchased after completing the main storyline. Additionally, Mario can travel to the Mushroom Kingdom, which includes Princess Peach's Castle and its courtyard. The Kingdom's Power Moons resemble Super Mario 64's Power Stars.

=== Rumors ===
Rumors spread rapidly after the game's release. The most popular was a pervasive rumor that Luigi existed as an unlockable character. In 1996, IGN offered a prize of $100 if a player could find Luigi, to no avail. This rumor was fueled by a very blurry message on a statue in the courtyard of Princess Peach's castle, seemingly reading "L is real 2401". In 1998, a fan received a letter from Nintendo denying this, explaining that the programmers had included the text as a joke and that it had no meaning, with the same blurry message being used in other Nintendo games; fans later determined that the text read "Eternal Star", debunking the rumor. In July 2020, a group of researchers discovered unused resources for Luigi from a discarded multiplayer mode in the game files during an event known colloquially as Nintendo Gigaleak.

=== Glitches and speedrunning ===
Since its original release, players have discovered multiple glitches that allow them to reach previously unreachable parts, including, in 2014, a coin not possible to be collected in ordinary play.

The game's speedrunning community has developed many techniques over the years, including: the Lakitu skip, a long jump that bypasses Lakitu's dialog explaining camera movement; the bloated Bob-omb glitch, where a Bob-omb is grabbed mid-explosion in a bloated state, which makes Mario be pushed by its large hitbox and allows him to clip through walls; and the "backwards long jump" (BLJ) glitch, where the player performs multiple long jumps backwards on a steep slope or stairs, which allows Mario to reach very high speed values and has numerous applications in speedrunning. The BLJ glitch in particular was patched in the Rumble Pak re-release in 1997, as well as the Japanese Virtual Console and Nintendo Classics re-releases, and the Super Mario 3D All-Stars compilation (due to the latter being based on the Rumble Pak version's codebase).

In 2013, Vinesauce, a video game-focused YouTuber, posted a compilation of various corruptions, replicated on the game's ROM. Another YouTuber, Pannenkoek2012, creates highly technical and analytical videos of Super Mario 64 glitches and mechanics, which have been covered many times by the video game press. The game has also inspired players to do challenges like beating it with certain restrictions, which requires deep understanding of its mechanics and bugs. One of those challenges, completing the game without pressing the A button, was beaten by a player named Marbler in May 2024.

=== Fan projects ===
Super Mario 64 has led to the creation of fan-made remakes, modifications and ROM hacks:

- Super Mario 64: Chaos Edition, a PC-emulated version of the original that loads codes which cause bizarre behavior. It received coverage after streaming ensemble Vinesauce posted a playthrough.
- Super Mario Run 64, converting Super Mario 64 into a 2.5D running game in the spirit of Super Mario Run
- Super Mario 64 Online, enabling online multiplayer. It was taken down after a copyright strike by Nintendo. It was later reuploaded and renamed to Net64.
- Super Mario 64 Maker, a Super Mario Maker-like level editor
- Super Mario 64 Odyssey, featuring levels based on Super Mario Odyssey and adding its mechanic of possessing enemies by throwing Mario's hat
- Super Mario 64: Last Impact, an original game that incorporates elements from other Mario games, such as the Fire Flower from Super Mario Bros., the F.L.U.D.D. cannon from Super Mario Sunshine, and the Bee Mushroom from Super Mario Galaxy
- Super Mario 64: Ocarina of Time, in which the world of The Legend of Zelda: Ocarina of Time is recreated in Super Mario 64, with new gameplay elements, puzzles, and a story
- Open World Mario 64, a battle royale–style mod set on a huge map made up of all Super Mario 64 levels, in the style of Fortnite Battle Royale and PlayerUnknown's Battlegrounds
- First Person Mario 64, a modification that fixes the camera configuration on first-person, often making the game much more challenging due to how the game demands acrobatic movements, and how the game does not render objects when they are too close to the camera
- Super Mario 64 FPS, a first-person shooter remake of the original, speedran by YouTubers Falsepog and Alpharad
- Super Mario 64 HD, a high-definition (HD) remake of the first level of Super Mario 64, Bob-Omb Battlefield, using the Unity game engine. The project was taken down following a copyright claim by Nintendo.
- B3313, a ROM hack based on beta content and urban legends surrounding Super Mario 64. Mario and Luigi are placed in a version of Peach's Castle with bizarre and surreal architecture, branching out into a complicated and nonsensical plexus.
- Super Mario 64 Coop Deluxe, a source-available mod that restructures the original game to support online cooperative gameplay for up to 16 players, adding playable characters such as, Luigi, Wario, Waluigi, Yoshi, Peach, Princess Daisy, Rosalina, and Toad

==== Decompilation ====
In 2019, fans decompiled the original ROM image into C source code, allowing Super Mario 64 to be natively ported to any system. The next year, fans released a Windows port with support for widescreen displays and 4K resolution. The port would allow for more graphical mods and forks, such as Render96, which implemented the original high-resolution source textures and created new character models and environments resembling those seen in the CG renders, and Super Mario 64 Plus, a fork of the Windows port featuring a new permanent death option, bug fixes, and an improved camera system. Fans have also created ports for several different platforms, including the Nintendo 3DS, PlayStation 2, PlayStation Vita, Dreamcast, and Android, 3DO, and Atari Jaguar. Nintendo has enlisted a law firm to remove videos of the port and its listings from various websites, taking them down via copyright claims.

=== Medical literature ===
In 2013, a study was conducted to see the plasticity effects on the human brain after playing Super Mario 64—chosen for its navigation element and the ability to play in a three-dimensional environment—for at least thirty minutes every day for two months. The study concluded that doing the previously mentioned activity caused the gray matter (a major part of the central nervous system) to increase in the right hippocampal formation and the right dorsolateral prefrontal cortex—brain areas thought to contribute to spatial navigation, working memory, and motor planning.
