= Mega Man Maker =

- Developer: Mega Man Maker Team
- Director: Meka
- Programmers: Meka (game); Luigi (game); Alex (server and database); Goldstorm (server and database); Jump Dash Evade (server and database); Mors (website)
- Artists: BushBacon; E-Clare; Gaem; Sasha; Son Loto
- Composers: Sasha; Sapphire Sunsets
- Series: Mega Man (unofficial)
- Platform: Windows
- Release: July 15, 2017
- Genres: Platform, level editor

Mega Man Maker (previously known as Mega Maker) is a fan-made platform game and game creation system, released in July 2017 for Microsoft Windows. Based on Capcom's Mega Man series, it enables players to create and share their own Mega Man levels online such as a traditional stage from the Mega Man series, puzzle levels and automatic levels (which were made popular in Nintendo's Super Mario Maker) and are able to play other people's levels either by searching their level IDs or the level name. The available categories are "newest", "oldest", "worst rated", "best rated", "popular" and "most played" with the number of upvotes and downvotes affecting best rated and worst rated respectively. It is commonly referred to as a Super Mario Maker alternative by Mega Man fans.

== Gameplay ==
The stage builder allows users to select from 198 enemies, 107 level objects, 40 bosses, 81 special weapons, 509 backgrounds, 481 tilesets, 4 playable characters, 148 music tracks from the original Mega Man series, and additional items added by the developers. Some of the features include the ability to rate other people's levels, controller support, and level browsing with nine different filters.

The game has two major modes, play and build. The build mode allows players to design levels by placing tiles and enemies, setting the music, establishing the character's moveset, etc. Players can also download other's levels and edit them.

The play mode allows players to upload their built levels and play others levels. Players can rate the levels they play with a thumbs up or a thumbs down. Players can also search for levels by name or by a specific ID code. There is also the Wily Challenge, a mode where players can get from 1 life to 100, depending on the options provided, to play through random levels. The Wily Challenge has three lengths -- Short (5 levels), Medium (10 levels), and Long (20 levels) -- five types of level quality, and three difficulties (Easy, Normal, and Hard).

== Development ==
The game has been in development since September 2016 and was started by the current leader of the game, WreckingPrograms, who served as the project's leader and central programmer, sprite artist, and designer. Eleven other developers provided content for the game, ranging from music, artwork and sprites to programming the game's website, while a team of fifteen playtesters were hired to test the game.

The game is built on top of the Mega Engine, which was also developed by the creator of the game. Besides bug patches, the developers have included more content down the road, including assets from Mega Man 7 onward as well as other additional features, such as the ability for players to place more than one boss in a level. Mega Man Maker and its development team are not affiliated with Capcom.

After release, numerous updates were made. 1.1 focused on adding content from Mega Man, while 1.2, 1.3, 1.4, 1.5 and 1.6 focused on adding content from 2 and 3, 4 and 5, 6 and 7, 8 and 9, and 10 and 11, respectively. The next update, 1.7, focused on content from all of the games represented up until that point. This update also introduced the character Roll as playable; and the feature to change music during a level. The 1.8 update featured new items, as well as tiles, weapons, backgrounds, and music from Mega Man & Bass, as well as the five titles for the Game Boy. The 1.9 update was released on 20 September 2024 and features more content from Mega Man 7 through Mega Man 11, as well as a new "decoration" system and new bosses from said games. The 1.10 update released on July 25, 2025.
