= Super Mario Maker 2 =

2019 video game

- Icon artwork, depicting Mario and Luigi wearing construction worker outfits and several game assets for designing courses in the Super Mario 3D World theme
- Developer: Nintendo EPD
- Publisher: Nintendo
- Director: Yosuke Oshino
- Producers: Takashi Tezuka; Hiroyuki Kimura
- Designers: Shigefumi Hino; Yasuhisa Yamamura
- Programmer: Fumiya Nakano
- Artist: Ryota Akutsu
- Composers: Koji Kondo; Atsuko Asahi; Toru Minegishi; Sayako Doi
- Series: Super Mario
- Platform: Nintendo Switch
- Release: June 28, 2019
- Genres: Level editor, platform
- Modes: Single-player, multiplayer

Super Mario Maker 2 (Note: Japanese: スーパーマリオメーカー 2, Hepburn: Sūpā Mario Mēkā 2) is a 2019 platform game and game creation system developed and published by Nintendo for the Nintendo Switch. It is the sequel to Super Mario Maker (2015) and was released worldwide on June 28, 2019. The gameplay is largely retained from that of its predecessor, in which players create their own custom courses using assets from various games across the Super Mario franchise and share them online. Super Mario Maker 2 introduces new features and course assets, including a single player story mode and new level assets based on Super Mario 3D World.

Like its predecessor, the game was met with positive reviews from critics, who praised its user interface, course editing tools, and music, although the online multiplayer mode was criticized. As of December 31, 2022, the game has shipped over 8.42 million copies, making it one of the best-selling games on the Nintendo Switch.

== Gameplay ==
A gameplay screenshot showing the level creation tools in the Super Mario World theme

Like its predecessor, Super Mario Maker 2 is a side-scrolling platform game in which players create their own courses using assets from across the Super Mario series and publish them onto the internet for others to play. Players can choose from a selection of prior Super Mario games to base their courses' visual style and gameplay on, including Super Mario Bros., Super Mario Bros. 3, Super Mario World, New Super Mario Bros. U, and the newly introduced Super Mario 3D World theme, which has been retooled to 2.5D to fit with the game's platforming style. Gameplay mechanics and enemy behaviors can vary between the styles, with some elements being limited to specific styles.

The sequel adds various assets and tools, including assets and a course theme based on Super Mario 3D World. This theme is especially different from the four others, with many features and gameplay mechanics unique to it. Due to the difference from this style to the others, it is labeled as an "extra" game style and the course has to be reset in order to switch to this style. This sequel also brings along the new vertical course feature giving creators the ability to raise the vertical height limit. It also introduces local and online multiplayer modes including co-op course creation, where up to two players can locally create stages together at the same time; as well as allowing up to four online players to complete user-made courses, cooperatively or competitively. (Note: At launch, online play was only possible with random players. A post-launch update was made available on October 1 and added the ability to play courses with friends.)

The game also features a World Maker mode, where players create their own overworld maps, creating the equivalent of their own Super Mario game, called a Super World. The world style is locked as Super Mario World, but the courses themselves can be any style. Up to six Super Worlds can be saved but only one can be uploaded. One world can have up to five levels, including a castle, and a single Super World can have up to eight separate worlds. A world can also feature Toad houses, where the player plays minigames for extra lives, and Warp Pipes to get around the world quickly.

Super Mario Maker 2 also features a new single player campaign known as Story Mode. The story follows Mario, Toadette, and several other Toads helping to rebuild Princess Peach's castle, which had accidentally been reset by Undodog, a non-playable character. Players must traverse through over 100 Nintendo-created courses in order to collect enough coins to rebuild the castle. Non-player characters also offer players extra tasks and jobs throughout the mode.

A Nintendo Switch Online subscription is required in order to access any online functionality in the game, including accessing player-created levels.

== Development and release ==
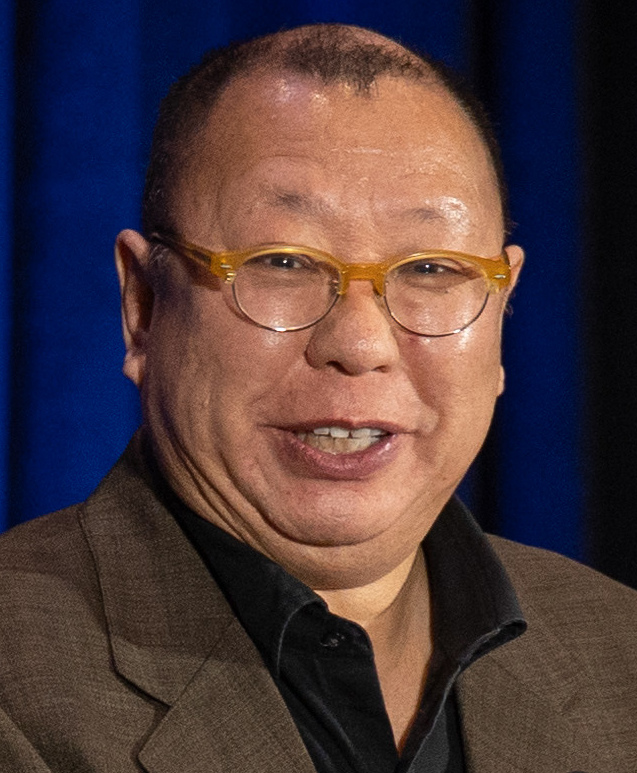
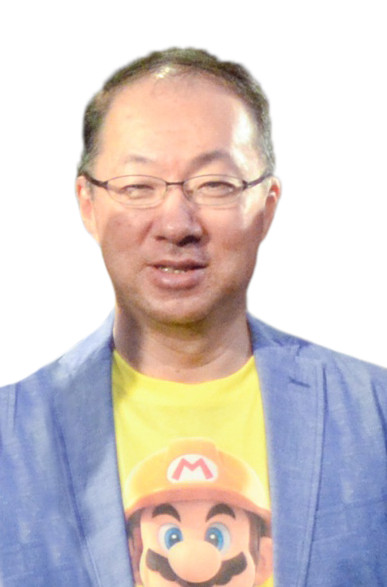
Producer Takashi Tezuka (left, pictured in 2024) and composer Koji Kondo (right, pictured in 2015)

Developed inhouse at Nintendo's Kyoto Development Center, planning for Super Mario Maker 2 began alongside development of the Nintendo Switch hardware itself. Most of the original development team reprised their roles for this sequel, including producer Hiroyuki Kimura, director Yosuke Oshino, and planner/game designer Shigefumi Hino. Nintendo's producer Takashi Tezuka stated that the theme for the sequel was to expand on what could be done compared to its predecessor and try new things, which took the form of new course elements and new side content in the form of a full-fledged single player campaign. Tezuka also stated that as players continue to upload levels, he and the development staff would use these creations as a reference for adding content after launch, viewing the dynamic as a give-and-take between developers and consumers. Longtime Super Mario series composer Koji Kondo served as the game's sound director and composed some music. Additional music was composed by Atsuko Asahi, Toru Minegishi, and Sayako Doi.

Super Mario Maker 2 was revealed during a Nintendo Direct presentation on February 13, 2019. It was released worldwide for the Nintendo Switch on June 28, 2019. Another Nintendo Direct was broadcast on May 15, 2019, which provided more information about new and returning features, gameplay modes, and pre-orders.

In Europe, a capacitive stylus was included as part of the limited edition bundle of the game for customers who pre-ordered.

=== Free updates ===
Three major content updates were released for the game:

- The first update, released on October 2, 2019, added more multiplayer options, including playing with friends on local area networks or nearby networks.
- The second update, released on December 5, 2019, added an extra mode themed around speedrunning Nintendo-created levels (Ninji Speedruns). The player has to compete against Ninji ghosts that represent other players from around the world for the best timed performance of the level. Additional parts were added, such as a Master Sword power-up that Mario can pick up to become Link and gain a different set of moves (Super Mario Bros. exclusive), ice-encased coin blocks, platforms that greatly increase the player's speed (Dash Blocks) (Super Mario 3D World exclusive), and invisible "P" blocks that are triggered by a "P" switch (P-Blocks). Spikes and Pokeys were also added as new enemies.
- The third and final update, released on April 22, 2020, added the ability to compose worlds to hold multiple courses, akin to the presentation of Super Mario World with up to eight different worlds and up to forty levels. A new power-up gives Mario the ability to pick up and throw objects as in Super Mario Bros. 2. Additional power-ups added in this update include the Frog Suit for the Super Mario Bros. 3 style, the Power Balloon for Super Mario World, the Super Acorn in the New Super Mario Bros. U style, and the Boomerang Flower for the Super Mario 3D World game style. Five other new power-ups were added to the Super Mario 3D World style as well, including the Propeller Box, the Bullet Bill Mask, the Goomba Mask, the Red POW Box, and the Cannon Box. The Koopalings and Mechakoopas were added as new enemies, along with red-colored keys guarded by Phanto (an enemy from Super Mario Bros. 2) and new ON/OFF Switch-triggered blocks and mushroom trampolines in the Super Mario 3D World game style.

== Reception ==
Reception

Aggregate scores
Aggregator	Score
Metacritic	88/100
OpenCritic	95% recommend

Review scores
Publication	Score
Destructoid	7/10
Electronic Gaming Monthly	8/10
Game Informer	8.75/10
GameRevolution	4.5/5
GameSpot	8/10
GamesRadar+	4.5/5
IGN	9.5/10
Jeuxvideo.com	17/20
Nintendo Life	10/10
Nintendo World Report	8.5/10
PCMag	4.5/5
Shacknews	9/10
USgamer	4.5/5
VentureBeat	95/100

Super Mario Maker 2 received "generally favorable" reviews, according to review aggregator website Metacritic. Fellow review aggregator OpenCritic assessed that the game received "mighty" approval, being recommended by 95% of critics. The online multiplayer feature, however, was criticised for its performance issues. GameSpot, who gave the game an 8/10, stated that online lag frequently ruined the experience.

=== Sales ===
It was the best-selling game in Japan during its first two weeks of release, selling 279,357 physical copies. By the end of March 2021, the game had sold over 7.15 million copies worldwide, making it one of the best-selling games on the Switch. The 2023 CESA Games White Papers revealed that Super Mario Maker 2 had sold 8.42 million units as of December 31, 2022.

=== Awards ===
Year	Award	Category	Result	Ref.
2019	2019 Golden Joystick Awards	Nintendo Game of the Year	Nominated	
2019	The Game Awards 2019	Best Family Game	Nominated	
2020	23rd Annual D.I.C.E. Awards	Family Game of the Year	Won	
2020	SXSW Gaming Awards	Trending Game of the Year	Nominated	

=== Controversies ===
Super Mario Maker 2's content moderation has received criticism due to frequent level deletions with vague reasoning. A common point of criticism includes banning of levels containing unintentional game mechanics or glitches. In June 2019, online streamer and speedrunner David Hunt, known online as GrandPooBear, reported his level named "Pile of Poo: Kai-Zero G" to have been removed due to "harmful or inappropriate content". Hunt noted that the word "poo" in his name was not the reason for the deletion, according to Nintendo customer support representatives, and stated that he had "no idea what actually caused it, [so he was] left feeling like they just hate [him]."

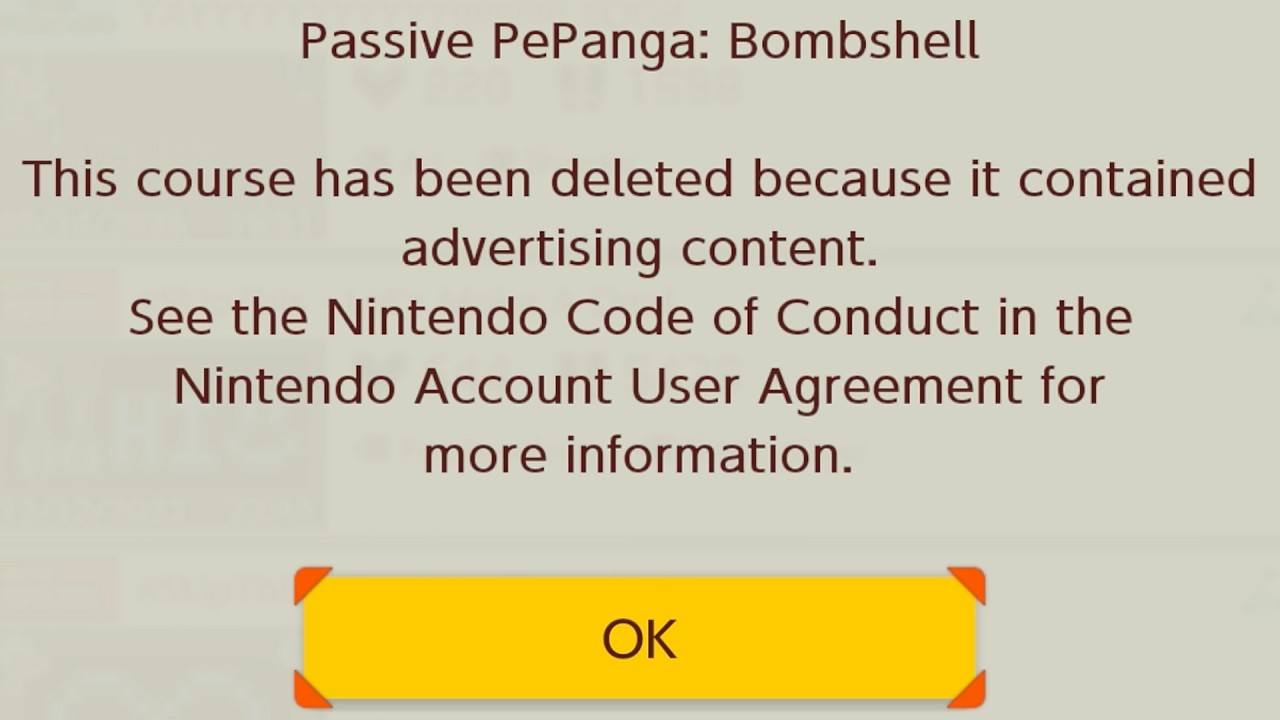
The notification received by Tan upon checking his profile after the incident

In April 2026, numerous levels uploaded online were suddenly deleted in a large removal wave, with IGN estimating the amount of delisted levels to be in the thousands. YouTuber Alex Tan, known online as PangaeaPanga, reported receiving an email notification about some of his levels being deleted due to violating the Nintendo Account User Agreement, with the reason being "advertising". He speculated that hashtags in level descriptions usually written to indicate the community of level creators, such as #TeamShell, were the cause of the deletion. Another YouTuber DGR supported this theory, claiming that, "according to Nintendo, having any hashtag in the name of your level is advertising or spam content."

== Footnotes ==
Notes
