= Super Mario Maker =

2015 video game

- Box art featuring Mario in a construction worker outfit and several game assets for designing courses
- Developers: Nintendo EAD; Nintendo EPD (3DS); Nintendo Software Technology (3DS)
- Publisher: Nintendo
- Directors: Yosuke Oshino; Yoshikazu Yamashita; Mika Kurosawa (3DS)
- Producers: Takashi Tezuka; Hiroyuki Kimura; Shigeki Yamashiro (3DS)
- Designers: Shigefumi Hino; Arisa Hosaka; Chris Polney (3DS)
- Programmer: Rory Johnston (3DS)
- Artists: Hirotake Ohtsubo; Kenta Usui; Nobuo Matsumiya; Mari Shibata
- Composers: Koji Kondo; Naoto Kubo; Asuka Hayazaki; James Phillipsen (3DS); Shauny Sion Jang (3DS)
- Series: Super Mario
- Platforms: Wii U, Nintendo 3DS
- Release: Wii U: JP: September 10, 2015; NA/EU: September 11, 2015; AU: September 12, 2015; Nintendo 3DS: JP: December 1, 2016; NA/EU: December 2, 2016; AU: December 3, 2016
- Genres: Level editor and platformer
- Mode: Single-player

Super Mario Maker (Note: Japanese: スーパーマリオメーカー, Hepburn: Sūpā Mario Mēkā) is a 2015 platform game and game creation system developed and published by Nintendo. An entry in the Super Mario series, the game allowed players to create, play, and share courses based on previous Super Mario titles including Super Mario Bros., Super Mario Bros. 3, Super Mario World, and New Super Mario Bros. U. The game was released on the Wii U in September 2015 as part of the 30th anniversary of Super Mario Bros.

Upon release, Super Mario Maker received positive reception from critics, who praised the game for its user interface and course editing tools. By May 2016, more than seven million courses had been created by players worldwide, which had been played more than 600 million times. A port for the Nintendo 3DS titled Super Mario Maker for Nintendo 3DS (Note: Japanese: スーパーマリオメーカー for ニンテンドー3DS, Hepburn: Sūpā Mario Mēkā for Nintendo 3DS) was released in December 2016 without the ability to upload levels to the online portal. It received more mixed reviews compared to the Wii U version. A sequel titled Super Mario Maker 2 was released for the Nintendo Switch in June 2019.

Sale of Super Mario Maker on the Wii U's Nintendo eShop was discontinued on January 12, 2021, and course upload support and the bookmark portal site was discontinued on March 31, 2021. The remaining online services for both the Wii U and 3DS versions of the game, such as playing levels uploaded before the portal site was discontinued, were shut down on April 8, 2024.

== Gameplay ==
Gameplay examples

Mario wears a Spiny Shell helmet, a new element in Super Mario Maker, in a course created in the style of Super Mario World.

A player creating a Ghost House course in the style of Super Mario Bros. 3. A user-selectable hand appears on the television screen each time edits are made on the Wii U GamePad.

Super Mario Maker allows players to create levels in the style of the Super Mario series, and publish them to the Internet for other players. The courses are based on the gameplay and visual style of Super Mario Bros., Super Mario Bros. 3, Super Mario World, and New Super Mario Bros. U, which all share the physics of the latter. The gameplay mechanics and enemy behavior vary between game modes. Some elements are limited to specific game styles, and other elements can be merged into other game styles, such as having Boos in Super Mario Bros.

In addition to traditional Mario elements such as Goombas, warp pipes, and power-ups, players can uniquely manipulate the behavior of elements. For example, enemies can be stacked, hazards can emerge from question blocks and warp pipes, shells can be worn as protective helmets, and cannons can emit chosen objects. These new combinations are enabled by editing tools working in tandem. Players can enlarge an enemy with a Super Mushroom, give an enemy a pair of flying wings, combine different attributes, and more. The Soundfrog adds audiovisual effects, though microphone-recorded sounds are removed from uploaded courses. New editing elements are unlocked gradually across nine days of course creation. The Mystery Mushroom, exclusive to the Super Mario Bros. theme, has the power-up of a Super Mushroom and dresses Mario in one of 153 costumes. Each of these costumes can be unlocked by playing through the 100 Mario Challenge, by clearing special Event Courses, or by scanning a corresponding Amiibo figurine. The 8-bit Mario figurine summons a Big Mushroom that makes Mario giant while making enemies resemble Mario by donning hats and mustaches.

After a created course was played to completion, it could then be published to the online Course World. There, all players could browse and play various user-generated courses, or participate in the 100 Mario Challenge with a set of randomly selected user-created courses with 100 lives. Alternatively, players can play the 10 Mario Challenge, with a selection of pre-made courses and only 10 lives. Players were initially limited in the number of uploadable courses, but by receiving stars from other players, they earned medals that allowed them to upload more courses.

== Development ==
Before developing Super Mario Maker, Nintendo had previously explored the concept of a video game editor in the 1990s. The company filed a patent in 1994, for console hardware and software that would allow players to pause a game, edit parts of the game, resume gameplay, and to save and share the changes. The patent described an example game called "Mario Factory," and later reviewers noted the similarities between this concept and Super Mario Maker.

Super Mario Maker was conceived as a tool for Nintendo's internal development team to make Mario levels. The team, however, quickly realized the tool's potential as a standalone game and pitched the idea to senior game designer Takashi Tezuka. Meanwhile, Tezuka had been wanting to make a Wii U follow-up to Mario Paint that used the Wii U GamePad. Upon seeing the Super Mario Maker tool, Tezuka realized that a course-making tool was more marketable than a mere art program. He noted to Polygon that building courses is "not as difficult or out of reach as drawing is" but that he "was inspired to bring the fun of Mario Paint into this course editor". This game is the directorial debut of Yosuke Oshino, who previously worked as a programmer on Pikmin, Pikmin 2, and New Super Mario Bros. Wii. The game's soundtrack was composed and arranged by Koji Kondo, Naoto Kubo, and Asuka Hayazaki.

The game was announced at E3 2014 with the title "Mario Maker". Although first revealed officially via Nintendo's E3 Digital Event on June 10, rumors of that title began earlier that month after a photo was taken of Nintendo's incomplete trade show booth which prominently featured the title. The game was rebranded as "Super Mario Maker" at E3 2015 during the Nintendo World Championships.

== Marketing and release ==
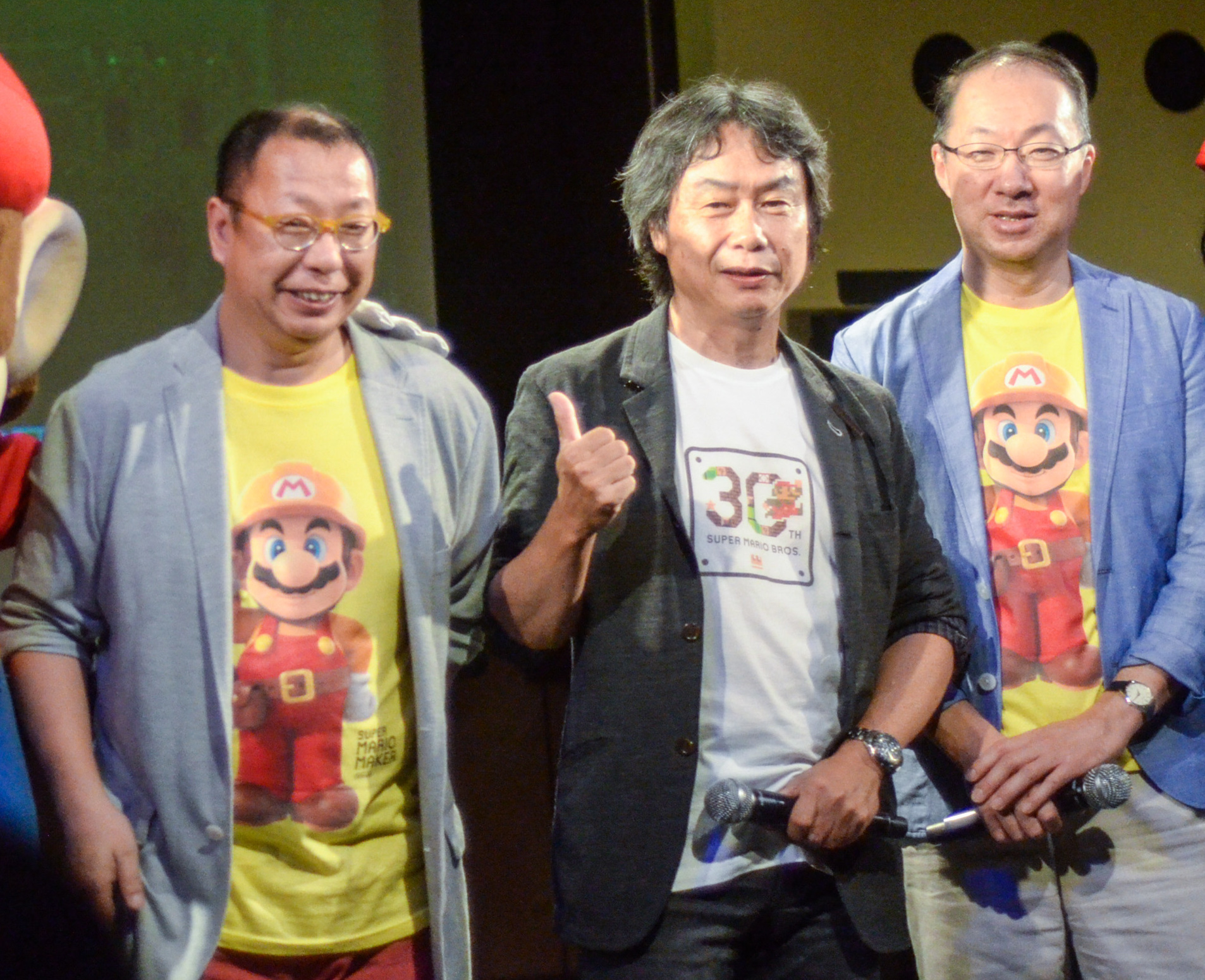
Takashi Tezuka, Shigeru Miyamoto, and Kōji Kondō wore Super Mario Maker T-shirts at E3 2015.

Prior to release, Nintendo allowed customers to play Mario Maker at Best Buy stores across North America on June 17 and 20, 2015. It was demonstrated with a new name, Super Mario Maker, on June 14, 2015, during the final round of the Nintendo World Championships event preceding E3 2015. The four courses created by Nintendo Treehouse for the Championships are playable in the final game.

Nintendo partnered with Facebook to host a special "hackathon" event. 150 Facebook employees were tasked with constructing courses using Super Mario Maker, and the winning team created a course to be featured in the game on its launch. Several notable video game designers showcased courses they had created, such as Michel Ancel, Koji Igarashi, Tim Rogers, and Derek Yu. Ancel's course is included in the base game as an Event Course.

Super Mario Maker was released worldwide in September 2015, with a corresponding Wii U bundle. Each copy of the game is packaged with a 96-page booklet of creative ideas, which is also a PDF download. Nintendo concurrently launched an 8-bit Mario Amiibo figurine, in two different color variations. The figurine is packaged alone, and within particular Super Mario Maker game bundles. A downloadable, Super Mario Maker-themed stage for Super Smash Bros. for Nintendo 3DS and Wii U was released on September 30, 2015, and is in the sequel, Super Smash Bros. Ultimate.

The game was originally intended to require players to wait each day to unlock new elements, but a launch day patch delivers new elements corresponding to the player's content creation efforts. Destructoid noted that there were many past Mario series elements missing from the game, but the game was updated with new features. The first major update, released on November 4, 2015, adds mid-course checkpoints, conditional power-ups, and Event Courses. Clearing certain Event Courses unlocks additional Mystery Mushroom costumes, such as Super Mario-kun and GameCenter CX presenter Shinya Arino. The game's second major update was released on December 22, 2015, which adds a speedrun leaderboard, and launched the Super Mario Maker Bookmark website, which allows players to browse uploaded courses and bookmark them to play, allowing for easier sharing of courses. The third update adds more Mystery Mushroom costumes that are unlocked by completing Normal- and Expert-level 100 Mario Challenges, and adds Super Expert mode.

A sequel, Super Mario Maker 2, was announced in a Nintendo Direct on February 13, 2019. It was released for the Nintendo Switch on June 28, 2019, with a new level theme based on the Wii U game Super Mario 3D World, new features including slopes and modifiable auto scroll direction, and new enemies, themes, and items.

On November 25, 2020, Nintendo announced that they were discontinuing support for uploading new courses on March 31, 2021. As a result, the game was removed from the Wii U eShop on January 12, 2021. The remaining online services for both the Wii U and 3DS versions of the game, such as playing levels uploaded before the portal site was discontinued, were shut down on April 8, 2024.

=== Super Mario Maker for Nintendo 3DS ===
Super Mario Maker for Nintendo 3DS was developed by Redmond-based subsidiary Nintendo Software Technology, with some features adapted or removed. It was released for the Nintendo 3DS in Japan on December 1, 2016, in North America and Europe on December 2, and in Australia on December 3. It includes 100 new courses designed by Nintendo. Players can exchange courses directly to friends or through StreetPass.

== Reception ==
Super Mario Maker

Aggregate scores
Aggregator	Score	
Aggregator	3DS	Wii U
Metacritic	73/100	88/100
OpenCritic	38% recommend	94% recommend

Review scores
Publication	Score	
Publication	3DS	Wii U
4Players	70/100	80/100
Destructoid	6/10	8/10
Edge	N/A	9/10
Electronic Gaming Monthly	N/A	9.5/10
Famitsu	N/A	37/40
Game Informer	7.75/10	9/10
GameRevolution	N/A	4.5/5
GameSpot	N/A	9/10
GamesRadar+	4/5	4/5
GamesTM	8/10	9/10
GameTrailers	N/A	8.7/10
Giant Bomb	N/A	5/5
Hardcore Gamer	N/A	4.5/5
IGN	7.2/10	9/10
Nintendo Life	9/10	10/10
Nintendo World Report	7/10	8/10
Polygon	N/A	9.5/10
Shacknews	N/A	9/10
USgamer	4/5	5/5
VideoGamer.com	8/10	8/10

=== Critical reception ===
The Wii U version of Super Mario Maker received "generally favorable" reviews, while the 3DS version received "mixed or average" reviews, according to video game review aggregator website Metacritic. IGN's Jose Otero praised the game's social elements, including its online features and the 10 Mario Challenge, stating that players would "see a genuine reverence for Mario’s history" in the online modes. He praised the course editor and its user interface, writing that "[n]o matter which style you choose, creating levels is an intimidating task but the well designed interface makes learning easy and intuitive" and that it "gives us a fun, flexible toolbox to build and play Mario courses like never before".

GameSpot's Justin Haywald praised the course editor, stating that "the mix-and-match nature [of gameplay elements] allows for exciting and anachronistic additions to familiar scenarios". He was disappointed in particular limitations, such as the absence of checkpoints originating Super Mario World, and the vertical and horizontal limits of stages. He ultimately concluded that "the game won't necessarily turn you into the next Shigeru Miyamoto, but you can almost feel a little bit of that magic rubbing off every time you upload a new creation".

Polygon's Griffin McElroy praised the game, saying he had "a tremendous amount of fun playing, but the way it developed that newfound appreciation for something I've known my whole life was the game's biggest accomplishment".

=== Community ===
The increasingly rich online library of user-generated content has been individually showcased and praised by reviewers, and has been praised by Mario series co-creator Takashi Tezuka. He described Nintendo's overall restraint in the gameplay difficulty of its own content, in the interest of mass appeal. He expressed both appreciation and caution for the fact that the users do not necessarily share the same restraint in their creations.

I expected that the users who wanted to play more of the hard courses would be attracted to Super Mario Maker. ... It was quite a surprise how much fun it was to watch the videos, without even playing myself. There are so many intriguing and inventive courses, like one which you couldn't beat if you picked up a mushroom. It's been a huge motivation for us developers to do better.

The game would contribute to a resurgence in the Kaizo level designing community, which creates extremely difficult levels to test patience and skill.

Many players criticized Nintendo for removing their online courses without warning or explanation. Patrick Klepek of Kotaku wrote that Nintendo should have made sure anyone creating levels for the game was aware of the company's strict policies regarding level creation so they would know what Nintendo would not find acceptable.

In May 2016, Nintendo announced that more than 7.2 million courses had been created worldwide, which had been played more than 600 million times. At the announcement of the discontinuation of the 3DS and Wii U online servers, an online community dubbed "Team 0%" attempted to complete any remaining uncleared levels from the game before the shutdown in April 2024, a goal which was achieved on March 15. At the time of the discontinuation announcement, 25,000 levels remained uncleared, with 1,000 of which being completed in the first seven days. By March 2024, only 178 remained. The final level to be cleared was "The Last Dance". The level "Trimming The Herbs" was previously regarded to be the last; however, it was revealed to be illegitimately cleared by the level's creator using TAS tools. Despite this, the level would eventually be cleared legitimately on April 5, three days before the shutdown.

=== Sales ===
Super Mario Maker debuted in Japan with more than 138,000 physical copies sold; it had sales of 245,000 copies in its first three weeks, by the end of September 2015. It was the second best-selling game in the UK in its first week of release, debuting at No. 2 on the UK software retail chart. It was the fourth fastest-selling game for the Wii U since the console's debut in 2012. In its first three weeks on sale in North America, 445,000 copies had been sold, with over 500,000 sold by the end of September 2015. Sales in the United States reached 1 million in mid-January 2016, making it the sixth Wii U game to do so in the country. By March 2021, 4.02 million copies had been sold worldwide. The Nintendo 3DS version had 162,180 copies sold within its first week of release in Japan. As of December 23, 2016, the Nintendo 3DS version had 448,160 copies sold in the region. As of December 31, 2016, 2 million copies had been sold for 3DS. By the end of March 2017, total 3DS sales reached 2.34 million.

=== Awards ===
Year	Awards	Category	Result	Ref.
2015	Gamescom Awards	Best Console Game Nintendo Wii	Won	
2015	Gamescom Awards	Best Family Game	Nominated	
2015	Gamescom Awards	Best Social/Casual/Online Game	Won	
2015	The Game Awards 2015	Game of the Year	Nominated	
2015	The Game Awards 2015	Best Family Game	Won	
2015	NAVGTR awards	Control Design, 2D or Limited 3D	Won	
2015	NAVGTR awards	Game Engineering	Nominated	
2015	NAVGTR awards	Game, Franchise Family	Won	
2015	NAVGTR awards	Use of Sound, Franchise	Nominated	
2015	Canadian Videogame Awards 2015	Fans' Choice: Best International Game	Nominated	
2016	2016 Kids' Choice Awards	Favorite Video Game	Nominated	
2016	19th Annual D.I.C.E. Awards	Family Game of the Year	Won	
2016	British Academy Children's Awards	BAFTA Kids' Vote - Video Game	Nominated	
2017	20th Annual D.I.C.E. Awards	Family Game of the Year (3DS version)	Nominated	

== See also ==
- Mario Paint – 1992 Super Nintendo Entertainment System game that inspired Super Mario Maker
- Mario Artist – 1999 sequel to Mario Paint with online publishing
- Kaizo Mario World
- Mega Man Maker
