= Toadette =

Video game character

- Mario character
- Promotional art by Shigehisa Nakaue (2018)
- First game: Mario Kart: Double Dash (2003)
- Voiced by: Jen Taylor (2003–2005) (Note: Mario Kart: Double Dash!!, Mario Party 6, Yakuman DS, Mario Superstar Baseball and Mario Party 7); Samantha Kelly (2007–2024); Laura Stahl (2025–present)

In-universe information
- Race: Toads
- Affiliation: Toad Brigade

Toadette, known in Japanese as Kinopiko (Japanese: キノピコ), is a character in the Mario franchise, first introduced in 2003's Mario Kart: Double Dash as Toad's racing partner. Originally appearing as mainly a side character playable in many spin-off titles, Toadette has since gone on to appear as a main playable character in many mainline Mario installments such as New Super Mario Bros. U Deluxe, Super Mario Maker 2 and Super Mario Bros. Wonder, as well as serving as one of the two protagonists in Captain Toad: Treasure Tracker.

In her debut, Toadette was initially voiced by Jen Taylor and has since gone on to be voiced by Samantha Kelly and Laura Stahl respectively. Despite often being seen as the female counterpart to the Toads, neither Toad or Toadette were designed by Nintendo with genders in mind but instead as a genderless race that display gendered characteristics. In her appearance in U Deluxe, Toadette is capable of using a power-up called the Super Crown, which transforms her into a Princess Peach look-alike called Peachette (Japanese: キノピーチ, Hepburn: Kinopīchi) that allows her to improve her jumping abilities.

Toadette received commentary in regards to her gender and the roles she appears in, with some characters describing her as a "Ms. Male Character" and comparing her to the comic strip character Smurfette. Additional commentary was given about her relationship with Toad. Following the reveal of her Peachette form, it became the subject of both critics and fans who tried to understand how the power-up worked and the implications it had within the franchise's lore. Other critics used the Super Crown as an analogy for the transgender community. Peachette's reveal also saw the creation of Bowsette, a fan created character based on the idea of the Mario villain Bowser if he used the Super Crown. The character became widely discussed among journalists and became immensely popular on social media as well as within art and cosplay communities.

== Appearances ==
Toadette debuted in 2003's Mario Kart: Double Dash, acting as the counterpart and racing partner to Toad. Both Toadette and Toad can be unlocked by the player after getting first place in the Special Cup on the 100cc mode, with both characters being the only ones that have access to the "Super Mushroom" item, later referred to in the series as the "Golden Mushroom". A kart named after Toadette can also be unlocked. Toadette would continue to reappear in the Mario Kart series as a playable racer in Mario Kart Wii, Mario Kart 8, Mario Kart Tour and Mario Kart World; in the latter two games, she receives unique costumes for the player to unlock. Tour also added a Toadette-themed costume for the playable Miis, which was later added in Mario Kart 8 Deluxe in Wave 6 of the Booster Course Pass. As part of a Mario Kart-themed collaboration with McDonald's in 2022, Toadette appeared as one of multiple collectable toys in Happy Meals. This toy was later featured in a Mario Kart 8 Deluxe collaboration in 2024.

Although her first appearance in the Super Mario series was a brief cameo in Super Mario Galaxy, her first notable appearance was in 2016's Super Mario Run. She initially acts as a referee and tally counter for the "Toad Rally" mode, however, the player can unlock her as a playable character by amassing a certain amount of colored Toads. Although not playable in Super Mario 3D World, a programmer named Nickoloxx discovered unused voice line and animation data in the Nintendo Switch version, suggesting Toadette was potentially considered to be a playable character in the game before being scrapped later in development. Toadette appears in Super Mario Odyssey, appearing in Peach's Castle. She takes on the role of an archivist by tracking the player's achievements throughout their playthrough; by completing each achievement she rewards the player with one of the game's collectable Power Moons.

The Super Crown power-up transforms Toadette into Peachette, a look-alike of Princess Peach that has additional jumping abilities.

Toadette was added as one of the four playable characters in 2019's New Super Mario Bros. U Deluxe, the Nintendo Switch port of New Super Mario Bros. U and New Super Luigi U, replacing the character slot of Blue Toad from the original Mario Bros. U. In the game she acts as an "easy mode" for players due to being the only character capable of using the Super Crown, a crown-shaped power-up that transforms Toadette into a Princess Peach look-alike called Peachette. Peachette acts similarly to the Flying Squirrel power-up; however, it makes her lighter when jumping and has the ability to double jump and float across levels, as well as allowing her to bounce out of bottomless pits, lava or poison. Toadette is also capable of using the power-ups that other characters can use. Peachette went on to appear as a playable racer in Mario Kart Tour, giving her the Mushroom Cannon item; she was later added in Wave 6 of Mario Kart 8 Deluxe's Booster Course Pass. Following U Deluxe, Toadette has gone on to reappear as a playable character in both Super Mario Maker 2 and Super Mario Bros. Wonder; however, she plays identically to the other characters available. In addition to being in Maker 2's course player modes, Toadette also appears in the game's story mode as the chief of reconstructing Peach's Castle following its destruction. In this role, Toadette is responsible for buying the materials for reconstruction using the money Mario accrued from completing missions, as well as granting the player the ability to choose which part of the castle to rebuild.

Toadette is one of the two main protagonists in the Super Mario 3D World spin-off, Captain Toad: Treasure Tracker. The game's first episode starts out with Captain Toad and Toadette treasure hunting for a star, with the two finding it before both the star and Toadette are kidnapped by the game's antagonist, Wingo. Captain Toad sets out on a journey to rescue her, eventually doing so. In the following episode, the roles are reversed with him being the one who gets kidnapped by Wingo instead, leaving Toadette on a similar journey to rescue him. Toadette has the same playstyle as Captain Toad; she is unable to jump due to being weighed down by her backpack, instead only being able to walk, run and use turnips and items to defeat enemies. At the end of Episode 2, she rescues Captain Toad before ultimately becoming kidnapped by Wingo again. During Episode 3, she is accidentally freed and ventures to find Captain Toad, with the episode swapping between the protagonists, though she is ultimately kidnapped by Wingo again and later saved by Captain Toad at the end of the episode. In Treasure Tracker's "Special Episode" DLC for the Nintendo Switch version of the game, both Captain Toad and Toadette are playable together in co-op mode. She later appears alongside Captain Toad and the Toad Brigade in the postgame of Bowser's Fury. Toadette's design in Treasure Tracker was later added as a Mystery Mushroom costume in Super Mario Maker in 2016, and as a costume to Mario Kart Tour in 2020. Concept art for the game depicting Toadette reaching for a mushroom was released by the Nintendo Spain Twitter account in 2019.

Toadette has gone on to appear in multiple other spin-off Mario series. In the Mario Party series, Toadette debuted in Mario Party 6 as a playable character, being the game's only unlockable character; players are required to unlock her by earning stars from the game's different modes. She would go on to make a playable appearance in subsequent entries in the series. In other entries, such as Advance, The Top 100, Super, and Superstars, Toadette instead serves as a host or a guide for the game. Mario Party DS features a board named after her called "Toadette's Music Room". In Mario sports games, Toadette has made multiple playable appearances in the Mario Tennis, Mario Golf, and Mario Baseball series, as well as in Mario & Sonic at the Olympic Games Tokyo 2020 as a guest character. Outside of the sports games, Dr. Toadette is also playable in Dr. Mario World. Additionally, she has made non-playable appearances in Yakuman DS and Dance Dance Revolution: Mario Mix. Among the Mario role-playing games, Toadette first appeared in Paper Mario: The Thousand-Year Door where she would teach the player new boot and hammer techniques upon unlocking them. She later made a notable appearance in Mario & Luigi: Paper Jam, becoming an inventor and designer. After Mario, Luigi and Paper Mario rescue multiple Paper Toads, she is able to coordinate the Toads to help her create giant controllable Papercrafts for the trio to use in Papercraft boss battles. During a mission in Mario + Rabbids: Kingdom Battle, the player is tasked with escorting Toadette across a battlefield, where the player can use a character's ability to either protect her or avoid her from being spotted. She later makes an appearance in the game's sequel.

== Concept and creation ==
"This is maybe a little bit of a strange story, but we never really went out of our way to decide on the sex of these characters, even though they have somewhat gendered appearances."

— Producer Koichi Hayashida discussing Toadette and Toad, 2014 GameSpot interview about Captain Toad: Treasure Tracker

Toadette resembles a Toad, fungi-humanoids that reside in the Mushroom Kingdom, with a pink mushroom cap head and primarily pink outfit, although in her debut in Mario Kart: Double Dash she wore scarlet dress and a maroon vest instead. Unlike regular Toads, Toadette has pigtails forming from her head resembling pink mushrooms. She was created for Double Dash as a racing partner for Toad, where both need to be unlocked by the player; according to the game's chief director, Kiyoshi Mizuki, Toad was originally meant to available from the beginning of the game but the developers couldn't think of who to partner him with, so they opted to leave him out at the time and make him unlockable. According to Treasure Tracker producer Koichi Hayashida in an interview with GameSpot, that despite other female Toads existing in titles such as Super Mario Bros.: The Great Mission to Rescue Princess Peach!, The Super Mario Bros. Super Show! and The Thousand Year Door, neither Toadette or Toad were created with a specific gender or sex in mind, but were rather a genderless race that take on gendered characteristics. Additionally, despite the guides for Double Dash referring to the pair as being partners and the guides for Mario Kart Wii and 8 referring to them as siblings, Hayashida debunked both and instead referred to them as "adventure pals" instead of anything romantic. When asked about why the race were mushroom-like, he denied them being fully mushroom but said that "This particular riddle might stay unsolved. That's one of the great mysteries of the Mario universe."

Like other Mario characters, Toadette is capable of picking up power-ups that give her new abilities, changes her height and outfit, as well as the color of her mushroom cap head. However, the Super Crown, an item resembling a crown with a mushroom in it, can exclusively be used by her. Using the Super Crown transforms Toadette into Peachette, a form nearly identical to Princess Peach but is differentiated by having gray eyes instead of Peach's blue eyes, pigtails, a different dress and being slightly shorter.

In certain productions, some depictions of Toadette were scrapped from the final product. During the development of Super Mario Odyssey, a Toadette costume for Mario was designed and considered for the final game. However, according to The Art of Super Mario Odyssey book, the artist of the design said it wasn't chosen as it did not "suit [Mario]", although the artist acknowledged that believed the hat for the costume, Toadette's pigtails, would have been fun to throw. In a piece of concept art designed by artist Jed Diffenderfer for The Super Mario Bros. Movie, it depicted a group scene of unused characters such as Toadette, Toadsworth and Princess Daisy fighting a hoard of enemies such as Birdo.

Toadette was initially voiced by Jen Taylor, who also voiced Princess Peach, Princess Daisy, Toad and Birdo between 1999 and 2008; Taylor's last appearance in the role was in Mario Party 7. Following Taylor's departure from Nintendo in 2005, Samantha Kelly, who also voiced Peach and Toad, began voicing Toadette starting in Mario Party 8. Kelly would continue to voice Toadette until 2025, where she was replaced by Laura Stahl for Mario Kart World.

== Reception ==
Since her debut, Toadette has been the subject of commentary surrounding her gender and connections with Toad. Commenting on the Toad species, Vice's Zack Kotzer described them as cute and perpetually overjoyed; during which he compared the Toads to the Smurfs, adding that Toadette functioned similarly to the character Smurfette with both being the sole female among the species. However, other critics such as Zoey Handley from Destructoid used the comparison negatively as both bring the same baggage of being the only female in a group. In a special issue of the journal "Kinephanos: Journal of Media Studies and Popular Culture", authors Gabrielle Trépanier-Jobin and Maude Bonenfant ascribed Toadette the title of being a "Ms. Male Character", a term coined by media critic Anita Sarkeesian where the character is derivative of a male counterpart but designed with a stereotypical feminine features and whose personality is reduced to her gender and "girly-ness". However, Carolyn Cox from The Mary Sue pointed out that the aspect of Toadette being the stand-out female of the species was never intended for her as neither Toads nor Toadette were designed to fit a specific gender. During a study to conduct and develop a model that could map kawaii sounding vocalics in video game characters, Seaborn et al. discovered that Toadette was a "marginal case" of being perceived to have a kawaii voice based on the responses of 157 participants, having higher "kawaii rating" compared to other Mario characters in the study such as Toad, Baby Bowser and Luma who were not perceived to have a kawaii voice. Seaborn et al. explained that Toadette's voice, which was perceived to be of a "Child-Feminine" type voice in the study, exhibited a pattern where non-human(oid) or anthropomorphic characters who were believed to have a younger and more "girlish" voice, would be perceived as more kawaii than characters noted as being ageless and gender neutral.

The New York Times journalist Chris Suellentrop commented on Toadette's role as a flag waver in Super Mario Run by comparing her to a character from Grease. Suellentrop would scrutinize Peach and Toadette's appearance in the game as a failure to modernize the Mario franchise from "stale, retrograde gender stereotypes" and believed that the game depicted its female characters in "positions of near helplessness", lamenting that Nintendo was falling behind The Walt Disney Company with their depiction of female characters in Frozen and Star Wars: The Force Awakens. He would further criticize the fact that both female characters needed to be unlocked in the game, opining that the women in the game "feel like prizes"; however, Suellentrop acknowledged that this was also the case for some of the male characters in the game too. In her research paper on the depiction of librarians in video games, Laura Carroll argued that while Toadette fit the Ms. Male archetype, her role in Odyssey indicated she was not dependant of it due to her appearance and personality suggesting a background with "exploration and fieldwork" and would be ready to go on her own adventures, believing that she presented archivist work as "active, playful, and rewarding." Carroll further praised her Odyssey appearance for subverting common librarian stereotypes by portraying her as non-sexual and cheerful, but noted that she was still reminiscent of real-life librarians and archivist for her role in indexing the player's quests.

Toadette's appearance in Mario & Luigi: Paper Jam was praised by critics for fleshing out her character more. Reviewers noted that whilst the game had a rather limited cast, they responded positively to the fact that this allowed for her to become more notable within the game's narrative by fleshing her out as an inventor and giving her more of a personality; Edwin Garcia from Nerdist described her appearance in the game as "pleasantly spunky" whereas Robert Marrujo from Nintendojo hoped that her appearances in future Nintendo games would continue to improve. Writing for Shacknews, Ozzie Mejia praised Toadette's characterisation in the game as a revelation due to her "[breaking] out of the shallow concept of "Girl Toad" and actually becomes an honest-to-goodness fleshed-out character with distinct traits of her own." He would continue to compare her relationship with the Paper Toads as similar to the character Tron Bonne from Mega Man Legends, although he criticized the mini-games related to the Toads as being repetitive.

In the years following Hayashida's de-confirmation of Toad and Toadette's relationship, some fans and critics still questioned and debated the nature of their relationship after noticing the pair holding hands in an image in Mario Kart Wii, which was noted as the only time this had ever been depicted. Kellen Beck from Mashable concluded that the pair are a "happy, healthy couple", citing evidences from the games suggesting that the two go on many adventures and even live together; Beck further suggested their relationship to be of a sexual nature due to the latter evidence as well as facial gestures from Toadette within the aforementioned image, adding that "the creatures have no discernible genitals, but they're definitely getting down." Conversely, VG247's Nadia Oxford didn't believe the pair went as far, commenting that their relationship was "last pure thing in the universe."

=== Peachette ===
Following the reveal of Peachette in September 2018, both critics and fans have speculated on how the Super Crown functioned and the relationship between Toadette and Princess Peach. Writing for Polygon, Petrana Radulovic argued that Peachette wasn't merely a Peach look-alike but rather resembled a fusion of her and Toadette and believed this implied the idea that either this was the second stage or higher-life of the Toad species or that the humans of the Mario franchise had metamorphosed from Toads. Radulovic pointed to early depictions of Peach in the Super Mario Bros. manual depicting her with both a crown and a toadstool on her head, which can also be seen in her father known as the Mushroom King, as well as her originally going by the name "Princess Toadstool". Radulovic acknowledged that whilst the modern appearance of Baby Peach in the games does act as a counterargument, she felt it didn't change the fact that an object such as the Super Crown could be used to completely change a species and believed that Toadette's transformation into Peachette looking so similar to Peach hinted at something darker between the two.

Some fans in the Mario community were frustrated by the addition of Toadette and Peachette in U Deluxe, wishing the developers added an already established character such as Waluigi instead. Eurogamer's Tom Phillips surmised that Nintendo had essentially created a new character that played similarly to Peach just to keep the real Peach in her original role of being kidnapped by Bowser. Phillips mentioned that whilst it could have been extra work, he suggested alternatives where Princess Daisy could have been kidnapped or have the game's plot be changed to not have Peach kidnapped instead to justify her as a playable character. Writing a preview for the game, Kotaku writer Tim Rogers initially found Toadette's transformation into Peachette rather jarring, believing that the presentation of it didn't do the transformation's overall weirdness enough justify by stating that "faster than you can snap your fingers, Toadette's entire genre of creature changes"; Rogers also found the constant transformation between Toadette and Peachette throughout the game to be frustrating. Conversely he praised Peachette's controls by positively comparing it to the game's Super Acorn power-up, marking Peachette as an improvement over it due to her increased movement and hang time in the air, resulting in him wanting to play the whole game as her.

According to Kotaku writer Ethan Gach, the question of "why did the Toads elect a human as their monarch?" was commonly asked among fans of the Mario franchise, and that with the reveal of Peachette it had branched into more fan theories and conspiracies about the role of the Toads in the Mushroom Kingdom. Gach as well as writers from Eurogamer and Game Informer mentioned that one of the more prominent theories posited that Peach was originally a Toad and used the crown to become human as part of the Kingdom's leadership cycle, with Gach noting a "bizarre" version that suggested that Peach had been hiding this ability to prevent others from challenging her for the throne. Similarly, Game Informer writer Imran Khan questioned whether Peach would revert to Toadette when taking damage. Another theory pointed to an inverse where Toadette was actually Peach the whole time, with Gach trying to support the theory by noting that the pair are rarely seen together in the main series. Khan pointed to a similar theory that believed Toadette to be Peach's body double.

In an article for Visual Resources, scholar Jennessa Hester examined how the Super Crown, which doesn't display openly transgender elements in and of itself, could resonate with people who have experience gender dysphoria or gender transitioning. She identified Toadette's transformation as a hierarchy from an inferior to superior form where the game rewarded the player for keeping her in the Peachette form by granting her a more flexible gameplay experience; Hester linked this to how transgender people experience transitioning between their gender assigned birth into one that more embodies them through processes such as coming out, hormone therapy and surgeries. She further stated that the comparison is elevated through the design of the two forms, where Toadette is labeled by Hester as a "tomboyish adventure" and transforms into Peachette who is described as an "elegant and high-femme princess", which Hester believed mirrored the transition from masculinity to femininity. Both Hester and Transgender Studies Quarterly writer Jeremy Chow also noted how the existence of Peachette led to the creation of Bowsette within the fandom, who both writers describe as a trans icon.

=== Bowsette ===
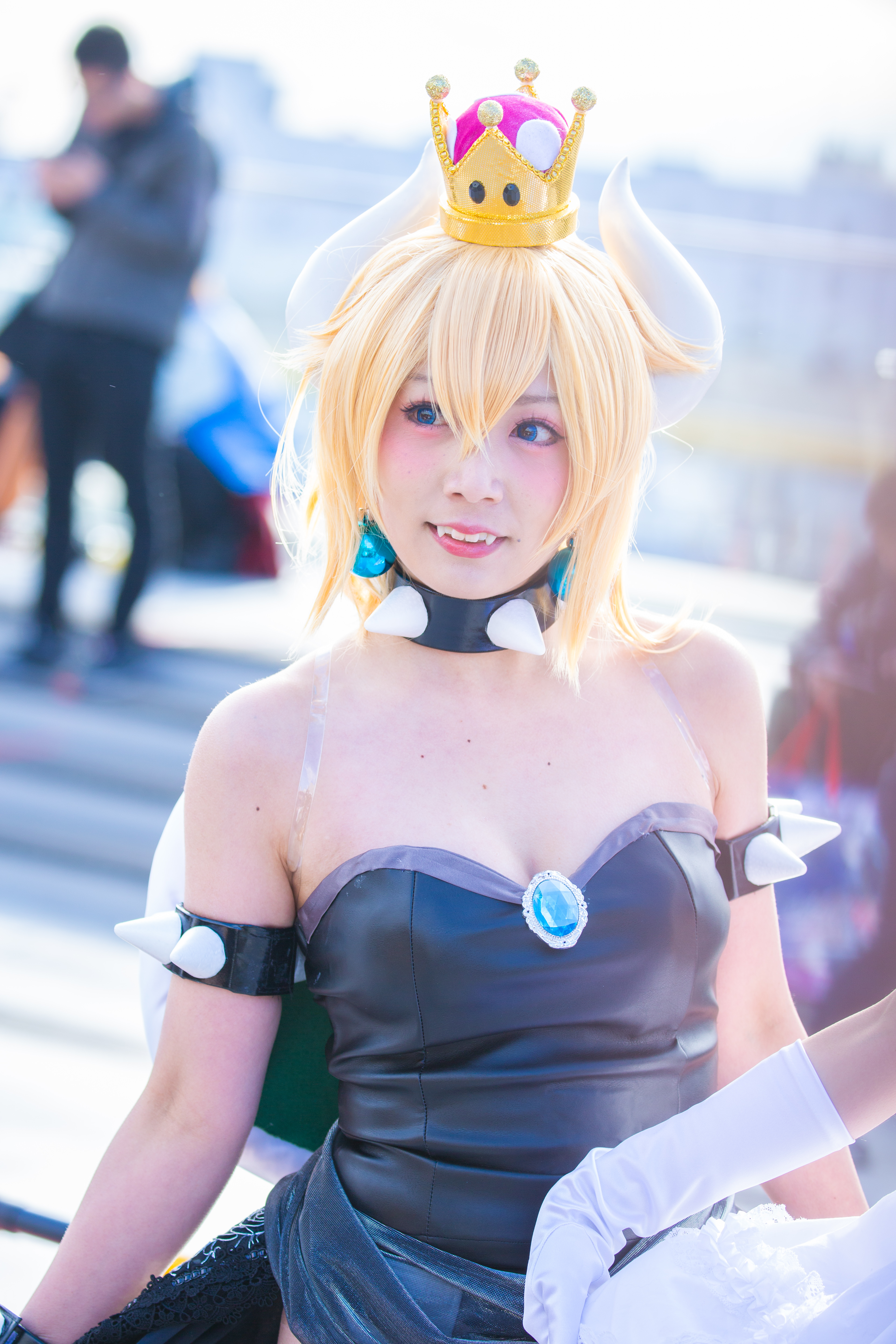
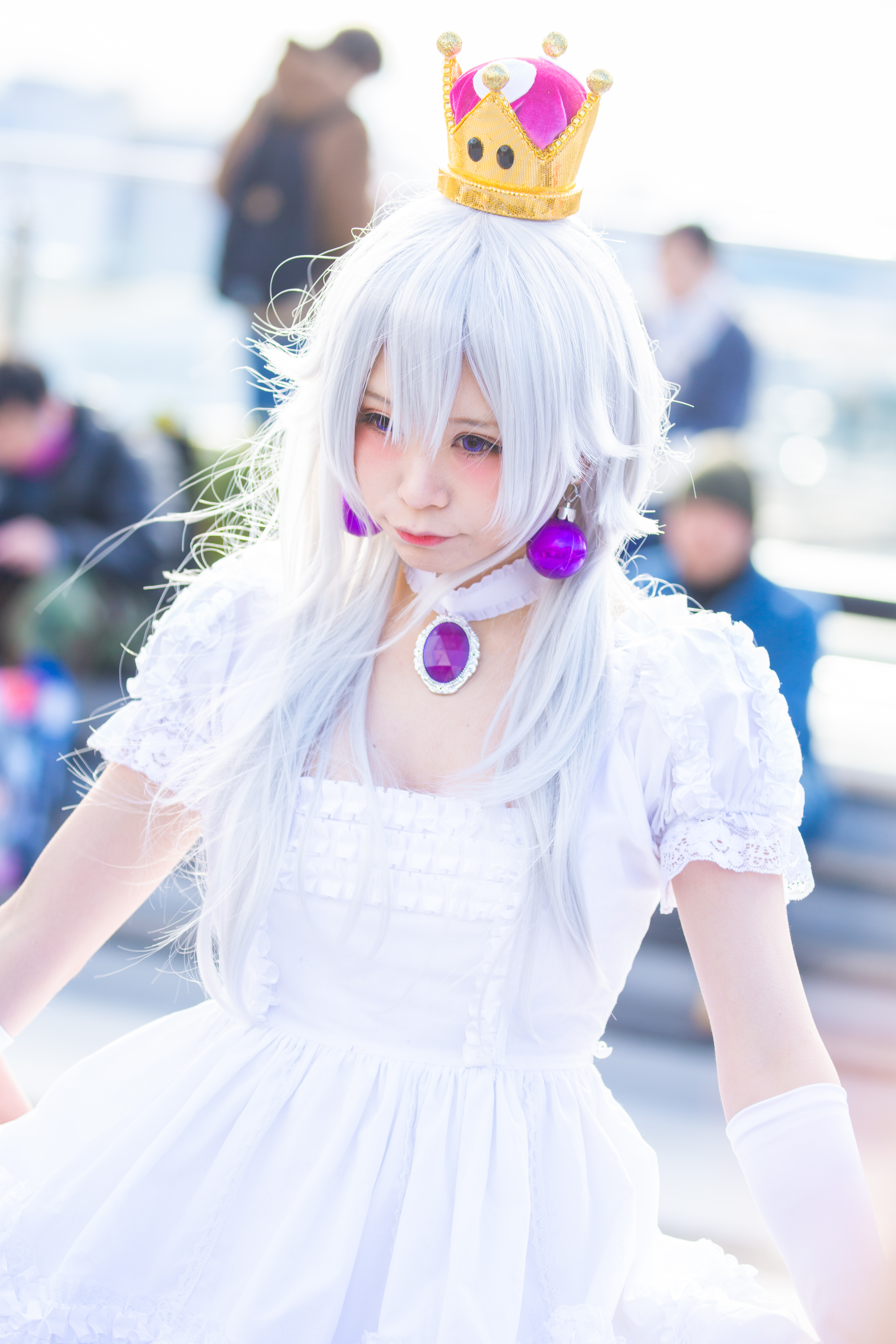
Peachette's reveal led to the creation of fan character Bowsette (left) and subsequent enemy variants such as Boosette (right), who were popular among artists and cosplayers.

In the wake of Peachette's reveal in a September 2018 Nintendo Direct, artist Ayyk92 published a webcomic on Twitter and DeviantArt about the Super Crown. The comic depicted Mario and Bowser disheartened by Peach's rejection of their individual marriage proposals, to which Bowser then reveals he has a Super Crown to Mario. In the last panel, the pair are seen walking past Peach and Luigi playing tennis, but Bowser has now transformed into a female character resembling Peach but with a black strapless dress and spiked attire on top of some of Bowser's original features such as his spiked shell and horns.

Dubbed "Bowsette" by English-speaking fans and "Koopa-hime" (transl. "Princess Koopa") by Japanese fans, the character quickly began trending on social media internationally to the point of being recognised as one of the biggest video game memes of 2018. She also became popular among artists and cosplayers online; journalists noted that fan art of Bowsette had ranged between wholesome, with some using it as a means to draw her with different body type, and erotic or NSFW, and that the character also receiving a large amount of searches on pornographic websites throughout the year. Major Japanese manga and video game artists also joined in on the trend by creating fan art of the character. Bowsette's popularity also led to other Mario franchise enemies receiving similar attention and fan art such as "Boosette", a transformed version of King Boo. Despite Bowsette's popularity, Nintendo refused to comment on it, instead posting on the New Super Mario Bros. U Deluxe website that only Toadette was capable of using the Super Crown. However, concept art from the Super Mario Odyssey artbook was discovered that featured an unused scene of Bowser taking control of Peach's body using his version of the game's capture mechanic, which looked similar to Bowsette.

The Bowsette phenomenon became the subject of commentary among critics due to its rapid popularity, overwhelming amount of art and the juxtaposition of an impure version of a character from a franchise typically seen as family-friendly; Some critics also commented that the name "Bowsette" was a misnomer, as the "-ette" in the name stems from Toadette rather than Peach. Hester had noticed that the character had been adopted as a representation of a transfeminine person in online circles, such as communities on art forums who accepted depictions of the character as either transgender or cisgender woman. Similar, Jeremy Chow described Bowsette as a mix of "dominatrix, monster-girl tropes in ways that have resounded with global trans women and trans femme audiences". Chow further identified how some people online saw Bowsette as form of transformative expression by going from gender-dysphoric to being confident and happy in their identity. Due to the character's popularity, many fans signed petitions to call for the character to become canon in the franchise's canon.
