= Toad (Mario) =

Video game character

- Mario character
- Promotional art by Shigehisa Nakaue (2017)
- First game: Super Mario Bros. (1985)
- Created by: Shigeru Miyamoto
- Voiced by: English: John Stocker (Super Show!); Keegan-Michael Key (Illumination movies); Isaac Marshall (Mario Kart 64); Jen Taylor (1999-2007); Samantha Kelly (2007-2025); Laila Berzins (2025-); Japanese: Yuriko Yamamoto (Mission to Rescue Princess Peach); Hiroko Emori (Mission to Rescue Princess Peach); Nanae Sumitomo (BS Super Mario USA via Satellaview broadcast); Tomokazu Seki (Illumination films); Tomoko Maruno (Mario Kart 64, Mario Party, Mario Kart Super Circuit)
- Portrayed by: Mojo Nixon (film, human); John Fifer (film, Goomba form)

In-universe information
- Race: Toads

Toad, known in Japanese as Kinopio (Japanese: キノピオ), is a character and race created by Japanese video game designer Shigeru Miyamoto for Nintendo's Mario franchise. A prominent red Toad serves as one of Princess Peach's handlers and appears consistently as a supporting character in the franchise.

While most Toads look virtually identical to each other and usually are not named individually, notable exceptions include Captain Toad, Toadette and Toadsworth. The most prominent trait of the Toads is their large, mushroom-like head with colored spots on top.

The Toads typically have assisting roles in the Mario franchise, but are occasionally featured as protagonists. Two Toads, Yellow Toad and Blue Toad are featured as playable characters along with Mario and Luigi in New Super Mario Bros. Wii, New Super Mario Bros. U and Super Mario Bros. Wonder. Toad appears as one of the playable characters in Super Mario 3D World, with blue spots resembling Blue Toad. Captain Toad: Treasure Tracker featured Captain Toad as the main character, and was the first game to have a Toad as the titular character.

== Concept and creation ==
During the development of Mario Kart: Double Dash, co-director Kiyoshi Mizuki said that he wanted to make Toad a selectable character from the beginning, but Nintendo could not think of a match suitable to be his partner for the tandem ride. Because of this, they planned to hide him as an extra character by himself. This would eventually lead to the addition of the character Toadette (Japanese: キノピコ, Hepburn: Kinopiko) as his new racing partner.

During the development of New Super Mario Bros. Wii, the developers at Nintendo decided between four characters to be playable in the game: Princess Peach, Toad, Wario and Waluigi (all suggestions made by fans). Two Toads (yellow and blue) were eventually included as playable characters in New Super Mario Bros. Wii due to their physical similarity to Mario and Luigi.

In February 2018, Yoshiaki Koizumi confirmed that the mushroom on Toad's head is part of his body, and not a hat. It had previously been a common topic of debate among fans.

In the main Super Mario video games, Toad was voiced by Jen Taylor starting from Mario Golf and lasting until Super Mario Strikers. Following Taylor's departure from the role, she was succeeded by Samantha Kelly, who voiced Toad in all games starting from Mario Party 8 and lasting until Mario & Luigi: Brothership. In other media, Toad was also voiced by John Stocker in the DiC cartoons and Keegan-Michael Key in two animated films. As of Mario Kart World, the Toads have two separate voice actors, with Laila Berzins voicing the main Toad and Paul Castro Jr. voicing the supporting Toads.

== Appearances ==
Toad and his race of mushroom people made their debut appearance in Super Mario Bros. where they play a minimal role in the game. They appear at the end of the first seven worlds as the Mushroom Retainers, who serve the princess. Once Mario or Luigi defeats Bowser, Toad rewards the heroes with the message: "Thank you Mario! But our princess is in another castle!", and in the Japanese Super Mario Bros. 2 they maintain this role. In the American Super Mario Bros. 2, Toad got his first individual appearance and was given a bigger role as one of the four playable characters. In Super Mario Bros. 3, Toad appears in the Toad houses where he provides items and extra lives for Mario to take on his journey. He is the sole playable character in the puzzle game Wario's Woods, where he tries to prevent Wario from taking over the woods with the help of Birdo and a fairy named Wanda.

The 3D Mario games introduced Toad's role as a helper who would provide assistance to Mario if he needed it, thus making him a major ally. In Super Mario 64, Toad explains the backstory, as well as explaining what Mario has to do to proceed in addition to giving Power Stars to Mario. In the remake Super Mario 64 DS, he is given character-specific remarks, such as mistaking Luigi for Mario in green clothes, or thinking that Wario would betray the rest of the group. In Luigi's Mansion, he appears in various parts of the mansion as a save point. Different colored Toads appear in Super Mario Sunshine as Peach's attendants.

In New Super Mario Bros. Wii and U, there are two playable Toads (multi-player only), Yellow Toad and Blue Toad. In New Super Mario Bros. U Deluxe, both Toads are playable in single player, with Blue Toad being unlocked by pressing ZL while Yellow Toad is chosen on the character select screen. Red spotted Toads are non-playable hosts of Toad houses and are strewn throughout levels that Mario must bring to the finish to save.

Toad plays a role in the 2011 3DS title Super Mario 3D Land in which he, upon his rescue at the end of World One, assists Mario throughout the rest of the adventure through the availability of Toad Houses, where he provides items and uncovering secrets in various levels. Toad appears as a prominent character in New Super Mario Bros. 2 again running the Toad Houses to assist both Mario and Luigi. In Super Mario 3D World, a blue Toad is a playable character.

In Luigi's Mansion: Dark Moon, five Toads of different colours act as assistants to Professor E. Gadd, who had sent them to investigate the mansions before Luigi had arrived. Throughout the game, Luigi meets up with the Toads, who help him uncover secrets in the mansions. The sequel Luigi's Mansion 3 also features multiple Toads assisting E. Gadd, all of whom have been captured and require rescuing.

Throughout the Mario RPG series, Toad is featured as more of a minor character due to the large amounts of generic Toads which appear in the games who seem to replace his role as a helper. In the times he does appear, Toad is once again a minor character who provides backstory to Mario and the others. In Super Mario RPG, he appears as a major NPC character who teaches Mario about the different skills to use in battles in the beginning as the duo heads to the Mushroom Kingdom (though Toad had to be saved by Mario along the way as he is kidnapped frequently by enemies). He appears more throughout the game, for example as part of Mario's nightmare. Toad appears as a playable character in Mario & Luigi: Superstar Saga for a short time when the player is exploring around Mario and Luigi's house. In Super Princess Peach, Toad is kidnapped earlier in the game along with Mario and Luigi by the Hammer Bros. However, Toad appears as a playable character in two of the minigames in the game. Toad appears in Super Paper Mario in 3 aspects of the game. He appears in the intro, telling Mario and Luigi that Princess Peach has been kidnapped, and later appears in the Arcade mini-game Mansion Patrol. Additionally, Toad is one of the 256 Catch Cards in the game. In Mario & Luigi: Bowser's Inside Story, a mysterious infection called "The Blorbs" causes the Toads to inflate to many times their normal size and roll around uncontrollably. Recent games in the Paper Mario series, starting from Paper Mario: Sticker Star in 2012, have prominently featured Toads as the most common non-playable character (NPC) that Mario can interact with. This is due to the fact that Nintendo's intellectual property (IP) team refrains them from creating new characters that could possibly interfere with the Mario universe.

In Super Mario Bros. Wonder, Yellow Toad and Blue Toad return as playable characters, in both single and multiplayer.

Toad has both playable and non-playable appearances in many Mario spin-off games, including the Mario Kart series and in most Mario sports games.

=== Captain Toad ===
Captain Toad is a Toad that serves as the leader of a group of Toad explorers known as the Toad Brigade. In an interview with Polygon, Captain Toad: Treasure Tracker director Shinya Hiratake said "I think honestly Captain Toad is someone that doesn't really care what's going on, but when he sees treasure he's like, 'I want it!'". He is described by IGN as an "unlikely protagonist who's weighed down by a heavy backpack and a desire for treasure".

He first appeared in Super Mario Galaxy, where he helped Mario or Luigi retrieve Power Stars. Captain Toad also appeared in the game's sequel, Super Mario Galaxy 2, with his brigade to again help Mario retrieve the Power Stars in order to save Princess Peach.

In Super Mario 3D World, Captain Toad appears in his own levels "The Adventures of Captain Toad" separate from the main playable characters. In "The Adventures of Captain Toad", Captain Toad must collect five Green Stars without jumping, and two hits will result in a life loss, but he can use his headlight to defeat any ghosts in his levels.

Captain Toad later starred in Captain Toad: Treasure Tracker, a year after Super Mario 3D World was released. In the game, Captain Toad sets out on a journey to rescue Toadette from Wingo, the game's main antagonist.

A Mystery Mushroom costume based on Captain Toad from Captain Toad: Treasure Tracker was made available through an update to Super Mario Maker. Captain Toad appears in all but three of Super Mario Odyssey's Kingdoms, rewarding the player with a Power Moon after they find him in each location.

When reviewing Treasure Tracker, IGN's Marty Sliva called Captain Toad and Toadette "a pair of sweet, endearing characters that [they] genuinely wanted to root for", saying that personality details like Captain Toad and Toadette "cower[ing] in fear when they see a ghost, add a nice dollop of charm to the whole package".

Captain Toad also appears in Super Mario Bros. Wonder, making his 2D Mario debut. He's found in all but two of the Flower Kingdom's locations, and rewards the player with 50 flower coins. He appears in Meetup at Bellabel Park, a Nintendo Switch 2 version of Wonder. In that version, Captain Toad plays a supporting role, accompanying Mario & co. to find the stolen Bellabel Flowers by the Koopalings.

=== Appearances in other media ===
- Toad appeared in the animated series The Super Mario Bros. Super Show! produced by DIC Entertainment in 1989. Although he usually tagged along with Mario and Luigi in cases where King Koopa had kidnapped Princess Peach, he sometimes got captured as well. Toad's role in the show was to be the 3rd main character to the Mario Bros. (as Luigi was also a major character rather than a sidekick). He remained on the show when it spun off into The Adventures of Super Mario Bros. 3, allowing them to live in his house. During the 2 shows, he got alternate forms such as The Toad Warrior, Baby Toad, Raccoon Toad, Frog Toad and even Super Toad; however, these forms of Toad have not made an appearance outside of the shows. Due to his & many other characters' absences in the Super Mario World game, Toad did not make an appearance in the TV show of Super Mario World with Yoshi and Oogtar (the latter having the same voice actor as Toad) instead taking his place.
- Toad appeared in the Super Mario Bros. comic books published by Valiant as well. In these comics, Toad often followed Mario on his adventures, seemingly as the hero's sidekick. He was a regular companion for King Toadstool, and even indulged in the King's activities.
- Played by Mojo Nixon, Toad appeared as a street musician in the non-canon Super Mario Bros. film. In the film, Toad is arrested for singing a song that badmouths Koopa, who punishes him by having him turned into a Goomba. Despite this, the Goomba-fied Toad (portrayed by John Fifer) remains hating Koopa and still manages to help Princess Daisy escape and distract the other Goombas by playing his harmonica.
- Toad also makes a cameo appearance in the Nintendo Wii U version of Scribblenauts Unlimited, as a guest character from Nintendo's Super Mario series.
- In the Mario & Sonic series, Toad appears as a referee in various events, but later became playable in the Wii U version of Mario & Sonic at the Rio 2016 Olympic Games. In the story mode of Mario & Sonic at the Olympic Games Tokyo 2020, he, Mario, Sonic, Bowser, and Doctor Eggman are accidentally trapped by Luigi on a device known as Tokyo '64. He was able to return in the real world near the end of the story.
- A costume of Toad is also one of the exclusive Nintendo character costumes available to be equipped to various characters in the Wii U version of Tekken Tag Tournament 2.
- Toad is voiced by Keegan-Michael Key in The Super Mario Bros. Movie (2023) and The Super Mario Galaxy Movie (2026). He retains his loyalty to Princess Peach, but he now carries attire relating to Captain Toad including a backpack and a walking stick. He is the first one to meet Mario when he arrives in the Mushroom Kingdom and he helps him find his brother, Luigi.

== Promotion and reception ==
As a character who appears frequently in the series, Toad is considered to be one of the major characters in the Mario franchise. The quote repeated by the Toads in Super Mario Bros., "Thank you Mario! But our princess is in another castle!", was ranked one of the most repeated video game quotes, and inspired a 2008 song by The Mountain Goats and Kaki King.

Toad ranked in the seventh slot on GameDaily's top 10 Nintendo characters that deserve their own games list; the site explained that he has a strong appeal that Nintendo has yet to tap into. Toad is listed in The Most Neglected Mario Bros. Characters list as a character whom Nintendo has ignored for quite a while due to his lack of starring roles in more recent games. IGN also listed Toad as one of the top ten characters needing a spin-off. In an Oricon poll conducted in Japan from 2008, Toad was voted as the eighth most popular video game character in Japan. Another poll (of over 1000 votes) conducted in Japan by NintendoWorldReport in concern to Japan's favorite Mario Kart racers listed Toad as the second most favorite Mario Kart racer in the country (only being beaten by Yoshi). Toad has been credited for being one of the celebrated characters in the twenty-fifth anniversary of the Super Mario Bros. games. UGO.com listed Toad on their list of "The Cutest Video Game Characters," stating "Once you get over his misleading name, you'll find Toad to be quite the adorable mushroom."

IGN editor Matt Casamassina criticized Nintendo for including the two generic Toads over more notable characters (including the red-spotted Toad himself) in the Mario series for New Super Mario Bros. Wii, arguing that the developers were being lazy to not include other characters because the Toads were easier to make. The Toads in the Paper Mario series following the release of Paper Mario: Sticker Star have been heavily criticized for lacking their diverse characteristics found in previous entries and for replacing the cast of original fictional races the series previously had.
