= Captain Toad: Treasure Tracker =

2014 video game

- Developer: Nintendo EAD Tokyo (Note: Development cooperation by 1-Up Studio. Nintendo EPD and Nintendo Software Technology developed the Switch and 3DS versions.)
- Publisher: Nintendo
- Directors: Kenta Motokura; Shinya Hiratake
- Producer: Koichi Hayashida
- Designer: Yuka Kitahara
- Programmers: Katsuyasu Ando; Norihiro Aoyagi
- Artists: Yuri Adachi; Daiki Nishioka; Keisuke Okubo
- Composers: Naoto Kubo; Mahito Yokota
- Series: Mario
- Platforms: Wii U, Nintendo 3DS, Nintendo Switch
- Release: Wii U: JP: November 13, 2014; NA: December 5, 2014; EU: January 2, 2015; AU: January 3, 2015; 3DS, Switch: WW: July 13, 2018
- Genre: Puzzle-platform
- Modes: Single-player, multiplayer

Captain Toad: Treasure Tracker (Note: Known in Japan as Advance! Captain Toad (進め! キノピオ隊長, Susume! Kinopio-taichō)) is a 2014 puzzle-platform game developed and published by Nintendo for the Wii U. The game was re-released for the Nintendo Switch and Nintendo 3DS in 2018 with additional content. It is a spin-off of the Super Mario series and both a prequel to Super Mario 3D World (2013) and Super Mario Odyssey (2017). The game stars Captain Toad and Toadette as they complete levels, defeat enemies and save each other from the antagonist Wingo. Each level is contained within a miniature diorama-like environment that requires puzzle-solving and platforming challenges to complete. The player also uses the Wii U GamePad to rotate the camera and reveal new information and interact with the environment.

The game originated from the Captain Toad levels in Super Mario 3D World, which started as a prototype concept and were included as side levels in the final product. Captain Toad was selected as the main character because his large backpack would justify the lack of jump controls. The developers had wanted to make the concept levels into a full game since the start of 3D World's development, and upon Shigeru Miyamoto's request, development began after the release of 3D World. Plucking as an action was implemented for additional gameplay variation, and bonus challenges and collectibles were added to help with difficulty. The goal throughout development was to make the game enjoyable to as broad an audience as possible, and help normalize the use of camera control in video games.

Treasure Tracker was announced at E3 2014, releasing November 13 in Japan, December 5 in North America, and the following January in PAL regions. The game received generally favorable reviews, being praised for its graphics and concept but criticized for its camera control and never fully leaning into its gimmick. The 3DS and Switch versions were praised for their utilization of hardware, though the multiplayer was considered lackluster. The Wii U version sold over 1 million copies, making it one of the highest-selling games on the console. The Switch version sold over 2 million copies, placing it inside the top 50 best-selling games for the system.

== Gameplay ==
A gameplay screenshot showing the diorama-like style of the game's levels. The player uses the Wii U GamePad to view other angles of the environment, to get Captain Toad to the star.

In Captain Toad: Treasure Tracker, the player controls Captain Toad, a Toad, or his companion Toadette, attempting to safely navigate through various obstacles and reach a star at the end of each level. As in Super Mario 3D World, Captain Toad and Toadette can walk and run, but cannot jump due to their heavy backpacks. They are able to pull plants out of the ground to use as projectiles, a feature that is also used to interact with other items in the level.

Each level is contained in a small environment, requiring the player to solve puzzles or complete platforming challenges to complete the level in a linear fashion. By using the thumbsticks or motion sensors on the Wii U GamePad, the player can rotate the diorama-like level to different orientations, revealing new paths and parts of the environment. The GamePad can also be used to interact with the environment in some levels, such as using the touchscreen to move platforms, blowing into the built-in microphone to move moving platforms, and using the motion controls to aim and throw objects at enemies. The player has two hitpoints that can be lost by being hit by enemies. If the second hitpoint is lost, the player must restart the level. However, if all lives are lost, the game is over, hears one of Game Over Quotes from Super Mario 3D World . Mushrooms are hidden in levels that will restore a lost hitpoint when collected.

Collectibles are hidden in each level, and once a level is beat it can be completed with special conditions, such as completing the level without taking damage. When a Toad Amiibo is scanned the player is put into a random level and tasked with finding a hidden pixel art of Toad. In the Nintendo Switch port, the hide-and-seek pixel Toad challenges do not require a Toad Amiibo to play. The re-release for the Nintendo Switch included two modes of co-op multiplayer. In one mode the second player controls a pointer that can interact with enemies and toss turnips and primarily assists the first player. In the other mode player two controls a purple colored Toad with the same abilities as Captain toad. Additional Amiibo released featuring Super Mario Odyssey characters were also released and compatible with the Nintendo Switch version that unlock four bonus levels based on locations found within Odyssey. The levels can be unlocked by scanning the Amiibo or are made available after completing the game. 18 additional levels were also released the following year as paid downloadable content (DLC). With the removal of the Wii U GamePad the Nintendo Switch still retained some of its features when being used portably; if the player is playing Treasure Tracker while docked, a cursor will appear on the screen that the player controls using motion controls.

== Plot ==
The game opens with Captain Toad and Toadette ascending a tower together to claim a star. The villainous giant crow Wingo appears and steals the star, taking Toadette along with him when she grabs hold of it. The player guides Captain Toad as he tracks Wingo down to his lair and rescues Toadette. Each following chapter sees one of the two captured, and the player controls the other Toad on their way to save them. In the final scene of the game, they defeat Wingo, and the introduction to Super Mario 3D World plays out, and Captain Toad is seen following a falling green star into the glass pipe. For the Switch/3DS versions, the final scene shows Captain Toad following the Odyssey.

== Development ==
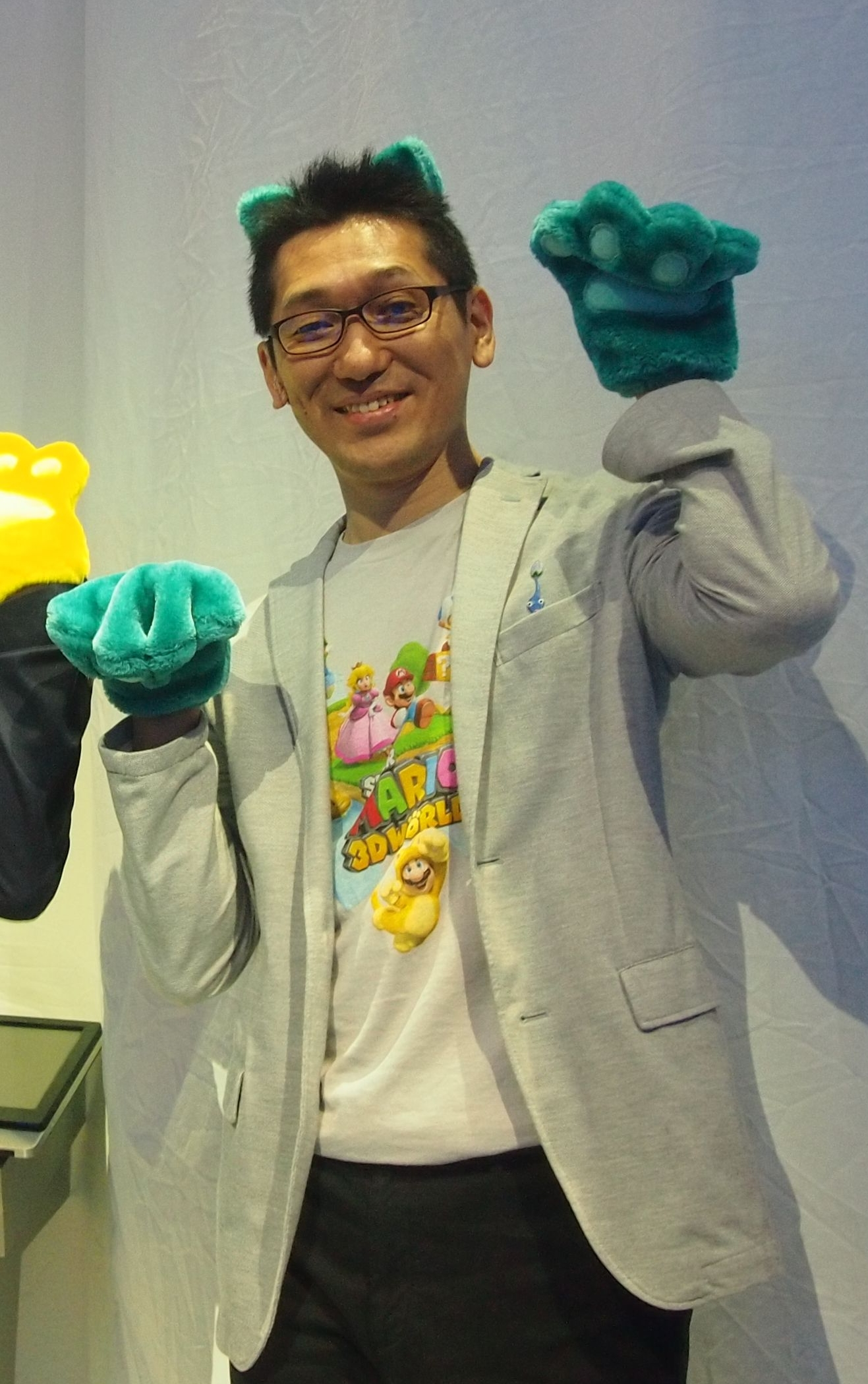
Koichi Hayashida (pictured promoting Super Mario 3D World at E3 2013) served as the game's producer.

Captain Toad: Treasure Tracker was developed by Nintendo EAD and published by Nintendo. Shinya Hiratake, the lead level designer of Super Mario 3D Land and Super Mario 3D World, served as the game's lead director, while Koichi Hayashida, who was a director for 3D World, served as a producer. Despite being in a position that was less hands-on, Hayashida said he was more involved with Treasure Tracker in its latter half than he was 3D World.

=== Super Mario 3D World levels ===
Among the many prototypes of what would become 3D World was a level that Hayashida described as a "little diorama stage using Mario"; the game's camera would look at the level from the outside. They found that allowing Mario to jump would result in the level needing to be much larger than intended, so the idea as the game's base concept was scrapped. However, they knew the concept would work if the player character was unable to jump. An idea was pitched to the creator of the Mario and The Legend of Zelda franchises Shigeru Miyamoto that featured Link as the featured character. The concept was rejected because to him, Link would traverse the environment and fight enemies with his sword, which took focus away from the puzzle gimmick. While considering other characters that would justifiably be unable to jump, the developers settled on the character Captain Toad from the 2007 video game Super Mario Galaxy because of his large backpack. Captain Toad would be included in a series of levels within 3D World that featured this original concept, which released in 2013. Since the beginning of the concept's conception they wanted to create a standalone game using it, and limited the amount of Captain Toad levels in 3D World because of it. Miyamoto asked them to make it a full game due to his enjoyment of the Rubiks' Cube, wanting to create a game that featured mechanics similar to it, which the staff were happy to do.

=== Design ===
Each level was designed to be its own unique environment with a linear path to completion. The developers wanted camera control to be required to teach new players or those unfamiliar with the concept to use it, both in Treasure Tracker and other future Nintendo games. Small tunnels and pillars were used to emphasize camera rotation. A camera alternative where the player viewed the game in first-person was explored but was too complex to include. At the start of development the team designed 100 levels and played through them together. One of their first problems was stale gameplay; since the game lacked jumping they relied on only walking, which became repetitive. To fix this they added a second mechanic, plucking, where Captain Toad could pull items from the ground and interact with objects in the environment. With the addition of plucking they were able to diversify the level mechanics. To make the level selection less overwhelming for the player, the levels were split into three groups called "episodes" that increased in difficulty. Bonus challenges and collectibles were added to give an additional challenge for more experienced players, and a time limit wasn't included so less experienced players could have however much time is needed to solve the puzzles. Various level designs were inspired by Arabian Nights.

A two-player cooperative multiplayer mode was considered and explored but ultimately scrapped from the final product, though the idea was revisited in the Switch version of the game. The game's story was made to be connected to that of 3D World's; the developers also considered connecting the story to Super Mario Galaxy, as a story being read by Rosalina. Captain Toad was designed to be a treasure hunter to justify his reason to explore, so much that it almost becomes a negative character trait. Hiratake described Captain Toad as "a crow that loves shiny things or a moth to a flame. He just loves treasure so much that he can't think about anything else". Hiratake ensured that Captain Toad had as much character as possible, emphasizing that he was an unlikely hero with personality. They included details to his character to show this, such as making him dizzy if he is interacted with on the Wii U GamePad, or being scared when approached by enemies. Miyamoto also pitched in with this idea, giving suggestions, such as how Captain Toad should never defeat enemies directly, only accidentally in attempt to save himself. Toadette was made playable further down the line to offer gameplay variance, and Hayashida noted that the two were "adventure pals" in the game.

=== Announcement and release ===
Captain Toad: Treasure Tracker was announced at E3 2014, detailing level mechanics and enemies. The game released November 13, 2014 in Japan and the following December 5 in North America. It released January 2 in Europe, although Game Retail Limited began selling copies two weeks early. After the game released a Toad Amiibo was created and was made compatible with the game; when scanned, the player is put into a part of a level and given ten seconds to find a hidden pixel art of Toad.

The game was re-released to other Nintendo consoles to reach a larger audience of players. The original plan was to release the game for the Nintendo 3DS only, because its stereoscopic 3D effect would better show the level's dimensions. While developing the Nintendo 3DS version, Nintendo was also developing the 2017 video game Super Mario Odyssey, where they found that many players enjoyed playing together with separate Joy-Con controllers. Because of this, they also decided to make release the game for the Nintendo Switch, including co-op multiplayer. The re-release was announced for both consoles via Nintendo Direct on March 8, 2018. The Nintendo Switch announcement also highlighted the new multiplayer, as well as additional levels themed after Super Mario Odyssey. Both versions released worldwide July 10, 2018. Paid DLC for the Nintendo Switch was announced in February 2019 featuring 18 new levels in five courses. The DLC released on March 14, 2019.

== Reception ==
Captain Toad: Treasure Tracker

Aggregate scores
Aggregator	Score
Metacritic	(Wii U) 81/100 (Note: Based on 78 reviews) (3DS) 79/100 (Note: Based on 7 reviews) (NS) 82/100 (Note: Based on 66 reviews)
OpenCritic	84% recommend 88% recommend(Special Episode) (Note: Based on 8 reviews.)

Review scores
Publication	Score
4Players	85/100
Edge	7/10
Electronic Gaming Monthly	8/10
Eurogamer	8/10
Famitsu	34/40
Game Informer	(Wii U) 8.25/10 (NS) 8/10
GameSpot	8/10
GamesRadar+	3/5
IGN	(Wii U) 8.2/10 (3DS/NS) 8.7/10
Nintendo Life	8/10
Nintendo World Report	(Wii U) 9/10 (3DS/NS) 8.5/10
Polygon	(Wii U) 8.5/10
VentureBeat	(Wii U) 85/100 (NS) 90/100

=== Critical response ===
Captain Toad: Treasure Tracker was well-received, with the Wii U, Switch, and 3DS versions all receiving "generally favorable reviews", according to review aggregator website Metacritic. Fellow review aggregator OpenCritic assessed that the game received strong approval, being recommended by 84% of critics.

==== Wii U version ====
Critics praised the game's visuals, especially the small details and an emphasis on cute graphics. Curtis Bonds of Nintendo World Report applauded the game's worldbuilding as being much more larger and complex than what was present of them in 3D World. 4Players reviewer Jan Wobbeking also praised the game's detail and visual design. Fitch noted the HD visuals and how they "help Treasure Tracker tell its simple-yet-charming tale remarkably well". Electronic Gaming Monthly's Andrew Fitch in particular enjoyed Captain Toad's characterization, finding it to be a fresh change of personality from Mario, a statement echoed by Marty Sliva of IGN. Although Polygon found the plot lacking, they believed the gameplay made up for it.

Gameplay and usage of the Wii U GamePad were also generally praised. Reeves was surprised at the level of depth in the gameplay and the amount of variance that can be found in levels that don't involve jumping. Writing for GameSpot, Peter Brown enjoyed the boss battles and their evolving difficulty. Although Polygon expressed the game did not have much depth as a mainline Mario game, the gimmicks and execution were "pure Nintendo" that continuously evolved and reiterated on itself. In a more critical review, GamesRadar+ reviewer Matthew Castle criticized the gimmicks of the game for never being fully justified or explored, such as removing the ability to jump, forcing the player to use ladders instead. Ben Reeves of Game Informer praised the utilization of the Wii U GamePad, and the ways it used the touchscreen, microphone, and motion controls to make each level unique. Brown considered Treasure Tracker to be a rare example of a Wii U game best played on the Game Pad. Sliva expressed some distaste in the GamePad being used excessively, and how motion controls were always active and accidentally used when not necessary.

Some critics expressed confusion in the game's genre and overall gameplay scope. With the lack of multiple objectives in 3D World, Fitch believed the game leaned too much towards being a platformer than a puzzle game. Castle expressed similar concerns, giving mixed opinions on the gameplay that never leaned toward either direction and making the game feel experimental overall. Welsh also felt this, but considered Treasure Tracker to be a successful example of a hybrid of puzzle levels and platforming. Ultimately, he felt that the 2004 video game Mario vs. Donkey Kong achieved this better, with various staff members at Famitsu echoing the statement that any type of audience can enjoy Treasure Tracker. Fitch's main gripe with the game was that there was "just not enough of it", and lacked a noticeable increase in difficulty. Brown felt otherwise, praising the challenging collectibles and the use of backtracking to give new spins on previous levels. Although Reeves also noted the small amount of content, he praised how each level was full of depth and lacked puffery.

The game camera received negative reception. Oli Welsh of Eurogamer found that camera use was often put in an awkward position by being too zoomed in or out, and was usually a distraction from gameplay. There were some instances were the camera became a hindrance for Fitch, requiring it to be turned while in danger of other enemies and becoming difficult to manage. Reeves also criticized the camera for not having the option for it to be controlled automatically, which alienated him from the experience and cited that it could be problematic for inexperienced or older audiences.

==== Switch and 3DS versions ====
Wobbeking noted it would be tedious for those who need to replay missions to unlock the extra levels themed after Odyssey; Reeves cited similar frustrations. Although Reeves called the removal of the levels based on 3D World to be "bizarre", he considered the newly added levels to be a "fair exchange". Jeremy Horwitz from VentureBeat was also disappointed that the Switch version did not include levels based on 3D World. Polygon was critical of the new levels, finding the majority of them to not match the puzzle quality of those found in the original game. The inclusion of multiplayer was appreciated by critics, but criticized for being a lackluster and trivial addition. Daniel Starkey of GameSpot also criticized the multiplayer based on how gameplay roles were divided between two players, leaving the experience to be unenjoyable for both as they have equally little action. IGN's Joe Skrebels derided the multiplayer and negatively compared it to the multiplayer in Super Mario Galaxy, also criticizing the ability for the second player to defeat enemies immediately and anywhere, removing their threat to the players.

Nintendo Life's Glen Fox overall declared that people who have already purchased the Wii U version "might not be persuaded" to buy the game for the additions, but it would still be appealing to those who did not own a Wii U to play the original. Reeves considered the Switch's motion control to be usable but obnoxious, as the cursor will remain on screen long after not being used. Fox did not mind the cursor, and preferred playing with the console docked for the sake of better graphics.

Although the graphical quality was lowered for the game to work on the 3DS, Skrebels was impressed by the port, and considered it to be one of the best-looking games released for the console. He also praised the use of 3D in the game and how they enhanced gameplay beyond the Wii U and Switch versions. Writing for Nintendo Life, Chris Scullion applauded the port for replicating the use of the Wii U GamePad by putting its interactive features on the second screen, but criticized the graphics for their jagged appearance and being difficult to discern when zoomed out. Nintendo World Report also positively received the control scheme, especially how one hand could be used to control Captain Toad and the other to control the camera with the stylus.

=== Sales ===
The 2021 CESA Games White Papers revealed that the Wii U version had sold a total of 1.37 million units as of December 31, 2020, making it one of the best-selling games on the Wii U. The Switch and 3DS ports of the game sold 108,698 and 42,818 physical copies respectively during their first two months on sale in Japan. As of March 31, 2019, the Switch port has sold 240,000 copies in Japan, and 1.18 million copies worldwide, making it one of the best-selling games on the system. It also revealed that the Switch version has sold a total of 1.77 million units, as of December 31, 2020. The 2023 CESA Games White Papers revealed that the Switch version of the game have sold 2.35 million copies as of December 31, 2022.

=== Accolades ===
Treasure Tracker was nominated for "Best Puzzle/Adventure" and "Best Wii U Exclusive" at GameTrailers' Best of 2014 Awards. In addition, it won the People's Choice Award for "Best Puzzle Game" at IGN's Best of 2014 Awards, whereas its other nomination was for "Best Wii U Game". The 3DS and Switch versions were nominated for "Nintendo Game of the Year" at the 2018 Golden Joystick Awards, and for "Game, Franchise Family" at the 2019 National Academy of Video Game Trade Reviewers Awards.

== See also ==
- 2014 in video games
