= Joy Mech Fight =

1993 video game

- Developer: Nintendo R&D1
- Publisher: Nintendo
- Director: Koichi Hayashida
- Designers: Noriyuki Harada; Syuzou Kousaka
- Programmers: Koichi Hayashida; Koichiro Eto
- Composer: Hideaki Shimizu
- Platform: Family Computer
- Release: JP: May 21, 1993; NA: September 6, 2023 (part of Nintendo Classics)
- Genre: Fighting
- Modes: Single-player, multiplayer

Joy Mech Fight (ジョイメカファイト, Joi Meka Faito) is a fighting game developed and published by Nintendo for the Family Computer, released in Japan on May 21, 1993. The game was released during the generation shift between the Famicom and the newer Super Famicom, and Joy Mech Fight is counted among the most important late Famicom games for utilizing the console's audio and visual capabilities to the fullest extent. It is also Nintendo's first attempt in the fighting game genre since Urban Champion after the success and craze of Capcom's Street Fighter II, which inspired other companies to create their own 2D fighters. The game was released on Wii Virtual Console in March 2008 in Japan, Nintendo 3DS Virtual Console in September 2013 in Japan, Wii U Virtual Console in May 2014 in Japan, and the Nintendo Classics service in January 2019 in Japan and September 2023 in North America and PAL regions.

Though the game's development is credited to Nintendo's R&D1 team, it was originally conceived by two programmers, Koichi Hayashida and Koichiro Eto, who met at a programming seminar hosted by Nintendo. The two completed the game while working at the seminar, naming it Battle Battle League (バトルバトルリーグ), and Nintendo released the game under its current title after both had started to work for the company.

== Plot ==
Once upon a time there were two scientists, Dr. Little Eamon (リトルイーモン) and Dr. Ivan Walnach (イワンワルナッチ) (renamed to "Ermin" and "Warner" in an English fan translation), who worked together to create the world's most spectacular robots. One day, Dr. Walnach disappeared with the laboratory's seven military robots before appearing on TV to declare his intention to conquer the world. Sukapon (スカポン, Skah-pon), an owarai robot who had been training in the Kansai region, is called back to the laboratory by Dr. Eamon, who remodels Sukapon into a military robot in a last-ditch effort to stop his evil counterpart.

Sukapon's first task was to defeat the seven other robots and allow Dr. Eamon to reprogram back to their original selves. All eight robots then proceed to take on Dr. Walnach's many robots, each wave stronger than the last. After fighting each of their doppelgängers at Dr. Walnach's castle, they finally face off against the most powerful robot, Hō'ō (ホウオウ, Hoh-oh), on the surface of the Moon.

After Hō'ō is destroyed, Dr. Walnach attempts to flee in his ship, but his ship malfunctions and explodes. Fortunately, Dr. Eamon rescues Dr. Walnach from the Moon's surface. Dr. Walnach later wakes up, back to his normal self, and Dr. Eamon convinces him that everything that happened was just a dream. Sukapon is remodeled back into an owarai robot, and all is returned to normal.

== Gameplay ==
The game's objective is simply to defeat all of the enemy robots placed in each level. The concept of the 2D versus fighting game was still new during the early 1990s, and the game's mechanics are visibly influenced by several other modern fighting games at the time.

The game consists of a standard versus mode (single-player or multiplayer) and a quest mode (single player). In the quest mode, there are 8 enemy robots per level (only 7 in the first level). Defeating the first 7 robots will cause the level's boss to emerge, and defeating this boss will allow the player to move on to the next level. The game is completed by advancing through all 4 levels.

The player begins the game with only one character choice (Sukapon), but every enemy robot of the first level that the player defeats becomes usable as a player character. The player can choose which character to use to combat each enemy robot. Defeating the first 7 enemies using Sukapon allows the player to choose from 8 friendly robots, but the first level can only be accessed in the very first playthrough. Screenshots of each victory are replayed after the completion of a level. Finishing all of the levels will allow the player to select a particular level that they wish to play. However, choosing some levels back-to-back may cause minor bugs in the screenshot replays. After beating normal mode, you unlock hard mode which is a harder mode. After beating hard mode unlocks special mode and all the non-boss robots. Special mode is even harder and the robots start using their hidden moves often. Beating special mode unlocks the boss robots.

=== Rules ===
Fan translation

All matches are held one-on-one, and both characters start with a full HP meter and two hearts. The meter decreases as the character sustains damage from the opponents attacks, and the character suffers a knockdown if the meter reaches zero. A knockdown will temporarily stop the action, as the character that was knocked down loses a heart and regains a full HP meter, while the opposing character regains a small amount of HP. The match is over when a character has no hearts remaining when their HP meter goes to zero. If both characters are knocked down at the same time, and neither character has any hearts remaining, the result is called a draw, and the match is restarted from the beginning. Sustaining large amounts of damage in a short period of time will cause the character to become temporarily unconscious, during which the player will be unable to move or attack.

=== Characters ===
There are 36 characters available in the game. However, the 8 characters from the final level are only minor variants of the first 8 characters (including Sukapon), so there are only 28 different types in actuality. Characters are all robots whose head, limbs, and body float around separately. There are 6 basic parts (head, body, right hand, left hand, right leg, left leg) for every character, but some have arm or knee parts as well, and quite a few have unique designs.

=== Special moves ===
In addition to the 6 basic moves (punch, power punch, kick, leg sweep, jump, guard) that all of the characters in the game can use, there are 4 additional special moves unique to each character. Unlike many other 2D fighting games, Joy Mech Fight does not require pressing a diagonal direction on the control pad to produce a special move. Some of the characters have hidden moves that are not listed in the game manual or tutorial. These hidden moves may be much more effective than the 4 regular special moves.

=== Difficulty ===
The quest mode is divided into normal and hard difficulty, and finishing the game at hard difficulty will reveal the special difficulty mode. In this mode, computer opponents will begin to use hidden moves and will fight far more intelligently than in the other two difficulty levels. Completing hard difficulty will allow the character to select all non-boss enemy characters in the single match mode, and completing special difficulty will allow boss characters to be selected as well.

== Graphics ==
The biggest quirk of the game is the way characters are displayed on screen. The limitations of the Famicom console made realistic animation of large-scale characters impossible to achieve, so in Joy Mech Fight, characters are robots whose head, limbs, and body float around separately. Dividing each character into individual sprites made animation much smoother, even in comparison with Super Famicom games. This method also lowered the total number of sprites needed for each character, allowing the game to have 36 different playable characters even with the Famicom's limited memory capacity. This was also the largest roster in a fighting game, until the release of SNK's The King of Fighters '98, which has 38 playable characters.

== See also ==
- List of fighting games
