= Bowser's Fury =

2021 video game

- Key art
- Developer: Nintendo EPD (Note: Development assistance from 1-UP Studio & Nintendo Software Technology. Nintendo Switch 2 update developed by Panic Button.)
- Publisher: Nintendo
- Composers: Daisuke Matsuoka; James Phillipsen
- Series: Super Mario
- Platform: Nintendo Switch
- Release: February 12, 2021
- Genres: Platform, action-adventure
- Modes: Single-player, multiplayer

Bowser's Fury (Note: Released in Japan as Fury World (フューリーワールド)) is a 2021 platform game developed and published by Nintendo for the Nintendo Switch. It is an original 3D platform entry in the Super Mario series and a spin-off title that derives mechanically from Super Mario 3D World (2013). The game's story involves Mario helping Bowser Jr. on a series of cat-themed islands surrounding Lake Lapcat, which are being terrorized by an enhanced form of Bowser called Fury Bowser, having been transformed by mysterious black sludge that has also enveloped the various island regions.

The gameplay of Bowser's Fury departs from the linear structure of 3D World in favor of an open-ended sandbox overworld encompassing the islands of Lake Lapcat, assuming various design elements of the non-linear 3D Mario entries, such as Super Mario 64 (1996), Super Mario Sunshine (2002), and Super Mario Odyssey (2017). The player assumes control of Mario with the objective of collecting Cat Shines by completing platforming challenges while traversing across the island areas. In contrast with the prior sandbox Mario titles, Lake Lapcat is one seamless open world that can be traveled on foot or with the use of Mario's dinosaur companion Plessie on water. Fury Bowser will momentarily awaken and cast darkness over the world during player activity, forcing them to either take cover until sunrise is restored, or confront him directly with the use of Cat Shines to transform Mario into a similarly sized figure, engaging Bowser in kaiju-like battles.

Bowser's Fury was primarily developed by Nintendo EPD. The title was announced in commemoration of the Super Mario Bros. 35th Anniversary event in September 2020 and was released on February 12, 2021. It is not available as a standalone title, instead being included alongside an enhanced port of 3D World for the Switch as part of Super Mario 3D World + Bowser's Fury. (Note: Japanese: スーパーマリオ3Dワールド ＋ フューリーワールド, Hepburn: Sūpā Mario Surī Dī Wārudo + Fyūrī Wārudo) The game received positive reviews, with many critics highlighting its open world, numerous deviations from both 3D World and prior 3D Mario games, and approach to nonlinear design; criticism was directed towards its lack of technical polish, repetitive challenges, and the intrusiveness of the Fury Bowser events. As of March 2024, Bowser's Fury has sold 13.47 million units worldwide in association with the Switch version of 3D World, making it one of the best-selling games on the console. In 2025, it received an enhancement update for the Nintendo Switch 2.

== Gameplay ==
Bowser's Fury is an open world platform game in which the player, as Mario, completes challenges to collect Cat Shines in order to free Bowser and Lake Lapcat from the control of the black sludge. Its core gameplay is similar to that of the 2013 platform game Super Mario 3D World, while also adopting elements introduced in Super Mario Odyssey.

Eurogamer noted the influence of Super Mario Sunshine on Bowser's Fury, from its scrappy approach to new concepts to its use of Bowser Jr. and debt to Shadow Mario challenges. GameSpot described the concept of Bowser's Fury as having put elements of Super Mario 3D World into the structure of Super Mario Odyssey. The player character Mario jumps between platforms and obstacles in a 3D environment. Each area of the world features a new gameplay twist. Mario collects bodysuit power ups that grant him special abilities, such as Fire Mario, Tanooki Mario or even Boomerang Mario. In each area of Bowser's Fury, Mario collects Cat Shines by completing challenges less than 10 minutes in length, such as traversing platforms or collecting shard fragments of a Cat Shine. There are 100 Shines to collect in the game, and each self-contained area has five, displayed in a lighthouse. After collecting a Shine, the game reconfigures the area's environment to set up the next Shine's challenge. As the player progresses through the game, more areas open to the player. Mario rides the dinosaur Plessie to navigate between each island area of the archipelago and to reach Shine challenges throughout the lake's waters, outside the island areas. Unlike other Mario games, all areas of Bowser's Fury are openly accessible without use of a hub world—traditional Mario levels connected without loading screens or boundaries. Also unlike Super Mario 3D World, the player has full, unfixed camera control in Bowser's Fury and is not restricted to a limited number of "lives"—instead, when Mario dies, the player loses 50 coins from their counter, which gets reset every 100 coins due to granting Mario a power-up.

Every few minutes, Bowser's fury transforms the daytime setting of Lake Lapcat into an apocalyptic nighttime setting, with fireballs raining down toward the player. The Godzilla-esque fury event can interrupt the player's activity every few minutes, but also gives new gameplay opportunities, such as generating new platforms in the sky and using the ability to bait Bowser's fiery breath to destroy otherwise indestructible obstacles. The player can end the storm by collecting a Cat Shine, activating a lighthouse to pierce the darkness. Alternatively, the player can wait out the event or, with enough Cat Shines, choose to directly confront Bowser in a kaiju-esque battle set in a reduced scale version of Lake Lapcat. After the fury, Bowser returns to the sludge and slowly begins to rise, indicating the timing of the next fury event, as the fury event does not occur on a predictable interval. Mario is joined by Bowser Jr., whom the player can direct to interact with wall markings and, optionally, can be configured to assist the player in attacking enemies and collecting coins. Alternatively, a second player can control Bowser Jr., with the same limited ability set. Bowser Jr. also stores power-ups for the player, and allow the player to swap between the item abilities as needed.

The basic game lasts about four hours for an average player, with an additional four hours of gameplay for players interested in collecting all 100 "Cat Shines" tokens. Visually, the game displays at a reduced framerate when played in handheld mode, with drops in frame rate during chaotic on-screen action.

== Plot ==
While on a walk, Mario discovers a mysterious M-shaped black sludge in the Mushroom Kingdom. After being absorbed by it, Mario finds himself in an archipelago of cat-themed islands called Lake Lapcat that have become overrun with black sludge. Upon his arrival, Mario encounters Fury Bowser, a dark version of Bowser that has grown to colossal size. Mario collects a Cat Shine, causing Bowser to retreat. Bowser Jr. appears and pleads for Mario's help to restore his father to normal; Mario reluctantly agrees.

The two travel across Lake Lapcat in order to obtain Cat Shines, aided by Plessie the aquatic dinosaur. After obtaining a certain number of Cat Shines, Mario gains access to the Giga Bell, a super-powered variation of the Super Bell. The Giga Bell transforms Mario into Giga Cat Mario, a colossal version of his regular cat form, allowing him to battle Fury Bowser.

After using the Giga Bells to fight Fury Bowser several times, Bowser is drained of the sludge which transformed him. Despite this, he remains colossal and out of control, and steals the three Giga Bells. Mario manages to retake the Giga Bells, using all three to turn Plessie into a giant and crush Bowser. Bowser is returned to his normal size, and Bowser Jr. breaks off his alliance with Mario as the two retreat. Mario and the cats of Lake Lapcat celebrate atop the still-giant Plessie. A series of paintings by Bowser Jr. shown during the credits explain that he was responsible for accidentally creating Fury Bowser, having painted his dad's face with his magic paintbrush while he was sleeping as a prank.

== Development and release ==
Bowser's Fury was developed by Nintendo's Entertainment Planning & Development department, with support from Nintendo Software Technology and 1-Up Studio.

Bowser's Fury was first teased at the end of a trailer advertising a Super Mario 3D World re-release on Nintendo Switch during the Super Mario Bros. 35th Anniversary Nintendo Direct on September 3, 2020. At The Game Awards show in December 2020, a new commercial was showcased, though it didn't reveal any new footage of Bowser's Fury itself. On January 12, 2021, a new trailer showcased the theming, story, and gameplay of Bowser's Fury. The game was released for the Nintendo Switch on February 12, 2021. As of August 2021, the game had sold over 6 million copies.

On April 4, 2025, Nintendo announced that select Nintendo Switch games would receive free updates that enhanced their presentation and enabled certain features when played on the succeeding Nintendo Switch 2 console, including Super Mario 3D World + Bowser's Fury. Bowser's Fury, in tandem with 3D World, received a resolution increase to 1800p (3200x1800 pixels) in TV Mode, while it displays at the native 1080p (1920x1080 pixels) output of the Switch 2 console's screen in Handheld Mode with HDR support, and improves handheld performance to 60 frames-per-second (FPS), double that of the game's Handheld Mode framerate on the original Switch. The update was developed by third-party studio Panic Button and additionally added support for GameShare, a feature enabling multiplayer with another Switch 2 or Switch console with a single copy of the game.

== Reception ==
Reception

Aggregate scores
Aggregator	Score
Metacritic	89/100
OpenCritic	95% recommend

Review scores
Publication	Score
Destructoid	10/10
Electronic Gaming Monthly	4/5
GameSpot	9/10
GamesRadar+	4.5/5
Hardcore Gamer	4.5/5
IGN	7/10
Nintendo Life	10/10
Nintendo World Report	9/10
NME	4/5
PCMag	4.5
Shacknews	9/10
The Guardian	4/5
VentureBeat	5/5

Super Mario 3D World + Bowser's Fury received generally favorable reviews from critics, according to the review aggregation website Metacritic. Fellow review aggregator OpenCritic assessed that the game received "mighty" approval, being recommended by 95% of critics.

Super Mario 3D World + Bowser's Fury was the best-selling game for February 2021 in the United States.

Reviewers noted the game's "experimental" nature, both in its inventive approach to the series' first fully open world, foretelling future Mario games, and its lack of technical polish relative to the series' standards, exemplified by its noticeable drops in framerate and unperfected ideas. The game's foray into a fully open world challenged the Mario tradition of leisurely, "meticulously designed obstacle courses", wrote Polygon, and instead presented as an improvisational rumpus room filled with colorful distractions, messy and warm. On the technical end, the game's framerate drops made Kotaku's reviewer desire for more powerful hardware.

Some reviewers were frustrated with the frequent interruptions caused by the Fury Bowser event, especially towards the end of the game, but others praised it as an adrenaline rush due to the added challenge and unpredictability. After a few hours, Ars Technica found the game repetitive and sparse, returning to the same areas for some challenges with only minor novelty. GameSpot too acknowledged a number of uninspired repeat challenges, exacerbated by the fury event's intrusion while pursuing some of the harder Shine tokens. Polygon appreciated the fury countdown's visibility, likened to the Mario level timers of prior games.

The game was nominated for Best Family Game at The Game Awards 2021.

== See also ==
- List of Nintendo Switch games
- List of platformers
- List of video games featuring Mario
- 2021 in video games
