= Koichi Hayashida =

Japanese video game developer

- 林田 宏一
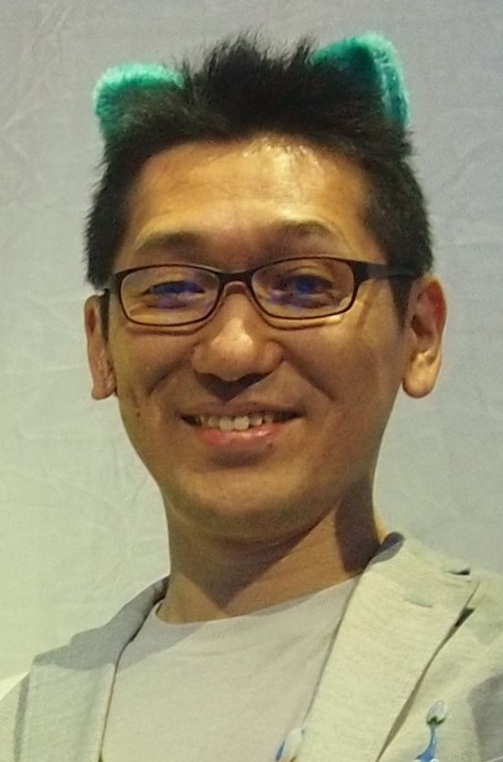
- Hayashida in 2013
- Born: 1969 (age 56–57); Tokyo, Japan
- Occupations: Director, producer, game designer
- Years active: 1993–present
- Employer: Nintendo

Koichi Hayashida (林田 宏一, Hayashida Kōichi) is a Japanese video game developer who has worked as a director, producer, game designer and programmer on multiple games from Nintendo, notably the Super Mario series. He was the director of Super Mario Galaxy 2 (2010), Super Mario 3D Land (2011), Super Mario 3D World (2013, with Kenta Motokura), NES Remix (2013), and NES Remix 2 (2014). He was a producer of Captain Toad: Treasure Tracker (2014) and Super Mario Odyssey (2017).

== Career ==
Hayashida began programming in fifth grade on the Commodore VIC-20. He began programming at Nintendo while the company was developing for the NES. He notably programmed for Super Mario Sunshine (2002). He was an assistant director on Donkey Kong: Jungle Beat (2004), and the level design director for Super Mario Galaxy (2007).

Hayashida was the director of Super Mario Galaxy 2 (2010). Hayashida and Shigeru Miyamoto developed a four-step process for the game's levels to teach a new game mechanic, titled kishōtenketsu, which derives from Chinese and Japanese poetry and manga writing. In the game version of kishōtenketsu, a game mechanic is introduced in a level, evolves to let players grow their skills, given a twist that makes the players think of the concept in a different way, and then concluded with a test that makes players use every concept they learned throughout the level. The technique has been used by Nintendo for numerous games since then.

Hayashida was then the director of Super Mario 3D Land (2011). To help his development team, he gave them "Miyamoto's Teachings": a book of quotations by Miyamoto, a more experienced designer who had begun to lessen his role at Nintendo. To make the game more approachable for less experienced players, Hayashida decided the game would technically end at its halfway point, when the story was over and the credits rolled, but there was a whole other half of more challenging levels. The game's development was delayed because of the 2011 Tōhoku earthquake and tsunami. To motivate the game's developers, who were previously separated by their different trades, Hayashida moved everyone into a common area to work more collaboratively.

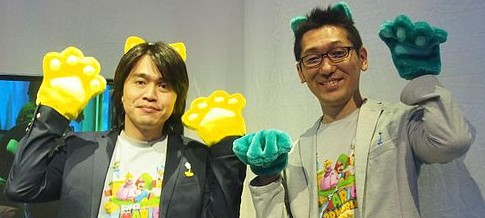
Koichi Hayashida (right) and Yoshiaki Koizumi (left) at E3 2013, promoting Super Mario 3D World.

Hayashida was a director for Super Mario 3D World (2013), directing alongside Kenta Motokura. He was the director of NES Remix (2013) and NES Remix 2 (2014). These games were first made for Wii U instead of the 3DS, partially because Hayashida was more familiar with the Wii U's architecture. He was the producer of Captain Toad: Treasure Tracker (2014) and Super Mario Odyssey (2017). He worked on the game design of Super Mario Bros. Wonder (2023).

== Ludography ==
Year	Title	Role
1993	Joy Mecha Fight	Director, programmer
2002	Super Mario Sunshine	Main programmer
2004	Donkey Kong Jungle Beat	Assistant director
2007	Super Mario Galaxy	Level design director
2010	Super Mario Galaxy 2	Director
2011	Super Mario 3D Land	Director
2013	Super Mario 3D World	Director
2013	NES Remix	Director, programmer
2014	NES Remix 2	Director, programmer
2014	Captain Toad: Treasure Tracker	Producer
2017	Super Mario Odyssey	Producer
2023	Super Mario Bros. Wonder	Game designer
2026	Super Mario Bros. Wonder + Meetup in Bellabel Park	Game design supervisor
