= Super Mario Odyssey =

2017 video game

- Developer: Nintendo EPD (Note: Development assistance from 1-UP Studio. Nintendo Switch 2 upgrade developed by Panic Button.)
- Publisher: Nintendo
- Director: Kenta Motokura
- Producers: Yoshiaki Koizumi; Koichi Hayashida
- Designers: Futoshi Shirai; Shinya Hiratake
- Programmers: Norihiro Aoyagi; Wataru Tanaka
- Artists: Rikuto Yoshida; Naoki Mineta; Sho Murata
- Writer: Hiroaki Hishinuma
- Composers: Naoto Kubo; Shiho Fujii; Koji Kondo
- Series: Super Mario
- Platform: Nintendo Switch
- Release: October 27, 2017
- Genres: Platform, action-adventure
- Modes: Single-player, multiplayer

Super Mario Odyssey (Note: Japanese: スーパーマリオ オデッセイ, Hepburn: Sūpā Mario Odessei) is a 2017 platform game developed and published by Nintendo for the Nintendo Switch. An installment in the Super Mario series, it follows Mario and his new ally Cappy—a sentient hat—as they journey across various kingdoms to save Princess Peach from Mario's nemesis Bowser's plans of forced marriage. In contrast to the linear gameplay of prior entries, the game returns to the primarily open-ended, 3D platform gameplay featured in Super Mario 64 and Super Mario Sunshine.

In the game, Mario explores various kingdoms and collects Power Moons hidden inside them, used as a fuel source to power an airship known as the Odyssey to travel to new locations. Cappy's main function is his capture ability, letting Mario possess enemies and other objects, helping him solve puzzles and progress in the game. The game includes a multiplayer mode and also supports virtual reality with a Nintendo Labo virtual reality kit, added in an update.

Developed by Nintendo's Entertainment Planning & Development division, the game entered development in 2013 soon after the release of Super Mario 3D World. Various ideas were suggested during development, and to incorporate them all the team decided to employ a sandbox-style of gameplay. Unlike previous installments such as Super Mario 3D Land and Super Mario Run, which were aimed at a more casual audience, the team designed Super Mario Odyssey to appeal somewhat more to the series' core fans.

Super Mario Odyssey was released on October 27, 2017, to acclaim, with praise for its inventiveness, originality, and for improving on concepts introduced in prior Mario games. It has since been ranked as one of the greatest video games ever made. The game won several awards and has sold over 30.8 million copies as of June 30, 2026, making it one of the best-selling Switch games.

== Gameplay ==
The player navigates the Seaside Kingdom as Mario, controlling a Goomba Tower using Cappy's capture ability.

A flat zone in the Cascade Kingdom, one of many side-scrolling sections that imitate the gameplay and visuals of the original Super Mario Bros.

Super Mario Odyssey is a platform game in which players control Mario as he travels across 14 different worlds, known as "kingdoms" within the game, on the hat-shaped ship Odyssey to rescue Princess Peach from Bowser, who plans to forcibly marry her. The kingdoms in the game return to the exploration-based level design featured in Super Mario 64. Each kingdom has Mario searching for and clearing various objectives in order to obtain items known as Power Moons, which are the power source of the Odyssey and grant access to new kingdoms. Checkpoint flags littered throughout the kingdoms allow Mario to instantly warp to them once activated. Certain levels feature areas called "flat" zones, where Mario is placed in a 2D side-scrolling environment similar to his appearance in the original Super Mario Bros.

In addition to his pre-existing moves, like triple-jumping and wall-jumping, Mario can throw his cap, the physical form of a hat spirit named Cappy, in multiple directions to attack enemies and use as a temporary platform. When the cap is thrown at certain objects, enemies, or non-playable characters, Mario is able to take possession of them, referred to as "capturing", allowing him to use unique abilities. For example, Mario can capture a Bullet Bill to fly across large gaps, a Tyrannosaurus to trample objects, a bolt of electricity called a Spark Pylon to climb up electric wires, and a tank called a Sherm to fire at enemies and break blocks for passage. Some actions can be accelerated by using motion controls in the Joy-Con controllers, but the game is otherwise fully playable with the Joy-Con attached to the console. Throughout the game, Mario can pick up coins that come in two types; regular gold coins and purple ones unique to each kingdom, to spend on items such as new hats and outfits, some of which are required for completing certain objectives. The game uses a health system similar to the Super Mario Galaxy games; although Mario has unlimited lives, the only penalty for dying is paying up to ten coins. The player can also collect items known as 'Life-Up Hearts' which grant three extra hit points. The game also features cooperative play, in which a second player takes control of Cappy and can move more independently of Mario.

The game requires a minimum number of Power Moons to be collected from each kingdom to move onto the next, though these may be obtained from any source, making major objectives largely optional. Once Bowser is defeated, each kingdom is repopulated with more Power Moons to collect. Collecting enough Power Moons allows for additional outfits to be purchased and unlocks two bonus levels. One of these levels is a boss rush called Dark Side, with 250 Power Moons required to enter. The other is a platforming gauntlet called Darker Side that combines many elements of the game, and requires 500 Power Moons to enter. In addition to this, there is also a level based on Peach's Castle from Super Mario 64 unlocked by beating the game. This level allows Mario to face harder versions of previously defeated bosses and earn additional Power Moons by completing in-game achievements.

The game features a photo mode that allows players to use a free-moving camera to take and save screenshots, with additional options such as filters and stickers. Use of the Odyssey-themed Mario, Peach, and Bowser Amiibo figurines allow for special in-game abilities and unlocking special costumes which are otherwise unavailable until after the player completes the game and collects enough Power Moons. Other Amiibo can be scanned to provide hints to finding Power Moons.

A hide-and-seek minigame, called "Luigi's Balloon World", was released as part of an update on February 21, 2018. In this mode, players have 30 seconds to hide a balloon somewhere in a kingdom, which is then attempted to be found by others playing the same mode. A leaderboard system ranks the players who have found the most balloons.

The game was updated in 2019 to be compatible with the Nintendo Labo virtual reality kit. In this mode, Mario must complete challenges in a number of kingdoms to recruit musicians and give them instruments by completing tasks related to musical notes.

== Plot ==
Bowser kidnaps Princess Peach from the Mushroom Kingdom and takes her aboard his airship, intent on forcibly marrying her. Mario, also aboard, attempts to rescue her but is knocked off the ship by Bowser's hat after a brief fight and falls into the neighboring Cap Kingdom. With Mario gone, Bowser stomps on Mario's cap and lets it drift into the ship's rear propellers, shredding the cap to pieces. A piece of the hat is grabbed by Cappy, one of the Cap Kingdom's sentient hat-like creatures called Bonneters. The two meet, and he explains to Mario that Bowser also kidnapped his little sister Tiara to be used as Peach's wedding tiara. Cappy joins Mario and takes the shape of Mario's cap, providing him with the ability to throw his cap and temporarily control or capture other creatures and objects and utilize their abilities. They travel to the nearby Cascade Kingdom, recover an airship called the Odyssey, and begin hunting Bowser down.

Mario and Cappy explore the various kingdoms to collect Power Moons to fuel the Odyssey and battle the Broodals—a team of anthropomorphic rabbit wedding planners hired by Bowser—who steal items including a dress, a cake, and a bouquet from different kingdoms to set up Bowser's wedding. Eventually, they catch up to Bowser in his own kingdom; however, Bowser subsequently departs for his wedding on the Moon and leaves the two to fight the Broodals in their Mecha-Broodal. They defeat the Mecha-Broodal and follow Bowser to the Moon.

Mario and Cappy fly the Odyssey to the Moon's surface and confront Bowser inside a cathedral. After Mario falls through a trapdoor set up by Bowser, the two battle in the Moon's interior, where Bowser is defeated and Mario frees Peach and Tiara; however, the cavern quickly begins to collapse. Upon landing deeper in the moon, Mario takes control of an unconscious Bowser using Cappy and escapes to the surface with Peach and Tiara. Back on the surface, Mario prepares to propose to Peach, but Bowser regains consciousness and proposes as well. The two fight over her hand in marriage before an overwhelmed Peach demands they stop, and she boards the Odyssey with Cappy and Tiara. The rivals are both heartbroken, until Peach tells Mario to come home with her. Mario boards the ship just in time, leaving Bowser stranded on the moon.

In the post-game, Mario and Cappy collect more Power Moons that were released from Moon rocks to traverse other parts of the Moon, known as "Dark Side" and "Darker Side", to complete other challenges. Meanwhile, Peach and Tiara travel the world on their own terms, and meet up with Mario along the way, giving him Power Moons each time they meet.

== Development ==
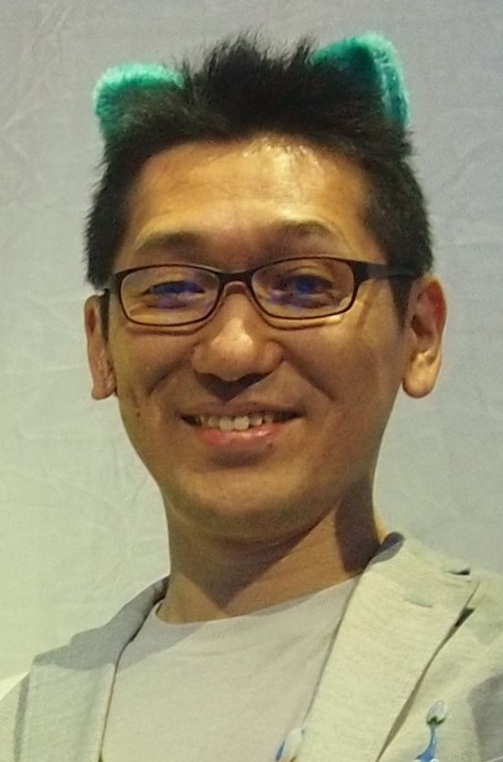
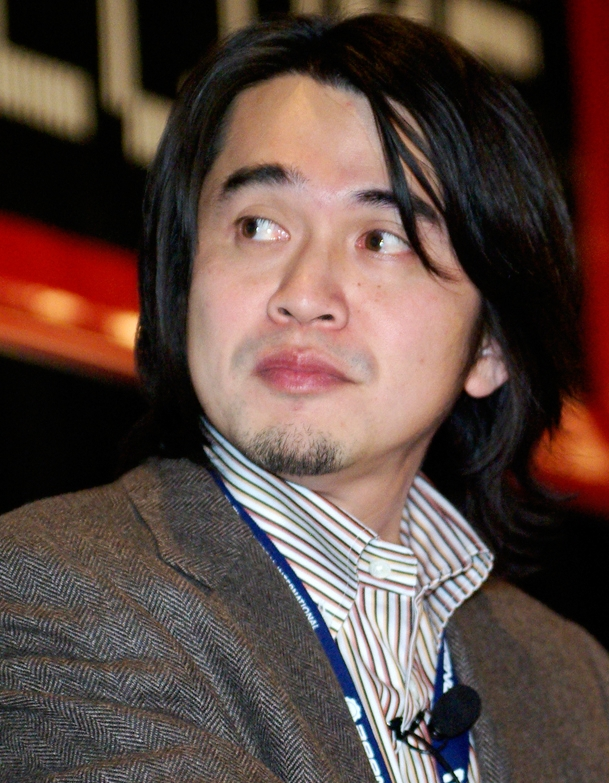
Producers Koichi Hayashida (left, pictured in 2013) and Yoshiaki Koizumi (right, pictured in 2007).

Super Mario Odyssey was developed by Nintendo's Entertainment Planning & Development division, with additional assistance from 1-Up Studio. The game was produced by Yoshiaki Koizumi and Koichi Hayashida, the same producers behind Super Mario 3D World, and directed by Kenta Motokura. Shigeru Miyamoto reassumed his role of what he calls the "Creative Fellow", and the developers gave him concepts and he gave feedback in return. According to Koizumi, Miyamoto "left us to our own devices quite a lot".

Odyssey was designed to appeal somewhat more to Mario's core audience; a departure from the series' then-recent focus on casual players, the game focuses more on dense, open-world exploration rather than the linear gameplay recent Mario games have taken, following instead the format of games such as Super Mario 64 or Super Mario Sunshine. According to Miyamoto, after Super Mario Galaxy and 3D World, linear gameplay was focused on less and the game would "go back to the roots, to Mario Sunshine". The game did intend to have camera control that was much easier to use than Sunshine, however. The first concept that came to be for Odyssey involved Koizumi using motion controls; he pictured motion actions that the Joy-Con controllers could be used for, and the most natural fit was throwing an object. To create a sense of connection to this gimmick, Mario's own hat was the object chosen to be thrown.

=== Design ===
In an interview with Koizumi, he stated that every main gameplay concept was decided on very early into the game's development cycle, with the philosophy of creating an entirely new experience for the series. These ideas consisted of traveling between kingdoms, collecting Power Moons, and other places. Cappy was also created in the first prototype, and motion controls were built off of this. Another goal was keeping the game running at 60 frames per second. Certain locations, such as New Donk City, contained a more realistic look and humans; this design choice was to emphasize the feeling of a new location that is different from what was expected.

One of the main aspects considered was the Switch's portability and TV docking, which affected how the game could be played. Motion controls were also implemented, being usable with a Joy-Con in each hand or the Pro Controller. The developers were careful in making sure the game was fun to play in these distinct ways. To bridge the two, the game was balanced to allow gameplay in short bursts or long sessions to satisfy both fields. Kenta Motokura mentioned at an interview at E3 that the game was made possible to play in these two ways; the player has the choice of either following a set storyline or can find power moons simply by exploring. They also made sure each platforming stage had numerous ways of completion.

Elements from Minecraft were a point of consideration during the design of gameplay. They initially thought a game with camera movement comparable to Minecraft would be difficult for children, but later changed their minds and believed this to be sufficient due to Minecraft's popularity amongst children.

=== Setting and characters ===
"Mario has always been a hat-wearing character, but because of the new action involved in this hat, we decided to make it into a character" ... "Part of it was we wanted to have someone Mario would go on this adventure with" ...

— Director Kenta Motokura, 2017 Time, interview

The developers constructed prototypes of gameplay gimmicks or platforming stages first; from there, they would discuss what kind of setting or theme the prototype would best fit within, and the locations would be constructed second. Thirdly, the locations would be taken and more ideas were designed specifically for them. The game's locations were built around the themes of journey and surprise, according to Kenta Motokura. The kingdoms have purchasable souvenirs to help make them more relatable and easier to connect to. Since the kingdoms were also open-world areas, the developers filled them with diversity and small details to give them a sense of empathy by making the player feel connected. Each kingdom was based on personal experiences from the designers, and they built off these locations by experimenting with how Mario could interact with them. The ability to take in-game screenshots was also considered by the team to be a natural fit.

Cappy was created into a character a little later after the hat throwing mechanic was introduced because the developers wanted a "buddy" to travel alongside Mario. The developers prioritized the city environment when selecting which environments to represent in Odyssey. They wanted a familiar aspect from the series to anchor players in the novel setting, and so chose Pauline, a character who first appeared alongside Mario in Donkey Kong, to be the mayor of New Donk City.

=== Music ===
The lyrics of Super Mario Odyssey's main theme song "Jump Up, Super Star!" reference many gameplay mechanics in the Super Mario franchise, like jumping, collecting coins, and 1-UPs.

When the developers were working on Pauline's character, they gave her an interest in jazz music. This led her to becoming a singer, with the inclusion of the song "Jump Up Super Star!" Super Mario Run had previously featured a track with vocals that was added in an update released one month prior to Odyssey. A swing music-inspired song, "Jump Up Super Star!" was composed by the game's lead composer, Naoto Kubo, with vocals by Kate Higgins. The song's chorus was made simple to be memorable and easy to sing along to. Lyrics were written in Japanese by Nobuyoshi Suzuki and translated to English by Rob Heiret. Another theme song, "Break Free (Lead the Way)", followed a similar process.

A sampler album containing 12 tracks from the game was released on iTunes in December 2017. A four-disc soundtrack containing 136 tracks was released in Japan in 2018 by Being Inc. The soundtracks include English, Japanese, and instrumental versions of "Jump Up Super Star!" and "Break Free (Lead the Way)". The discs also include commentary from some of the development staff.

== Release ==
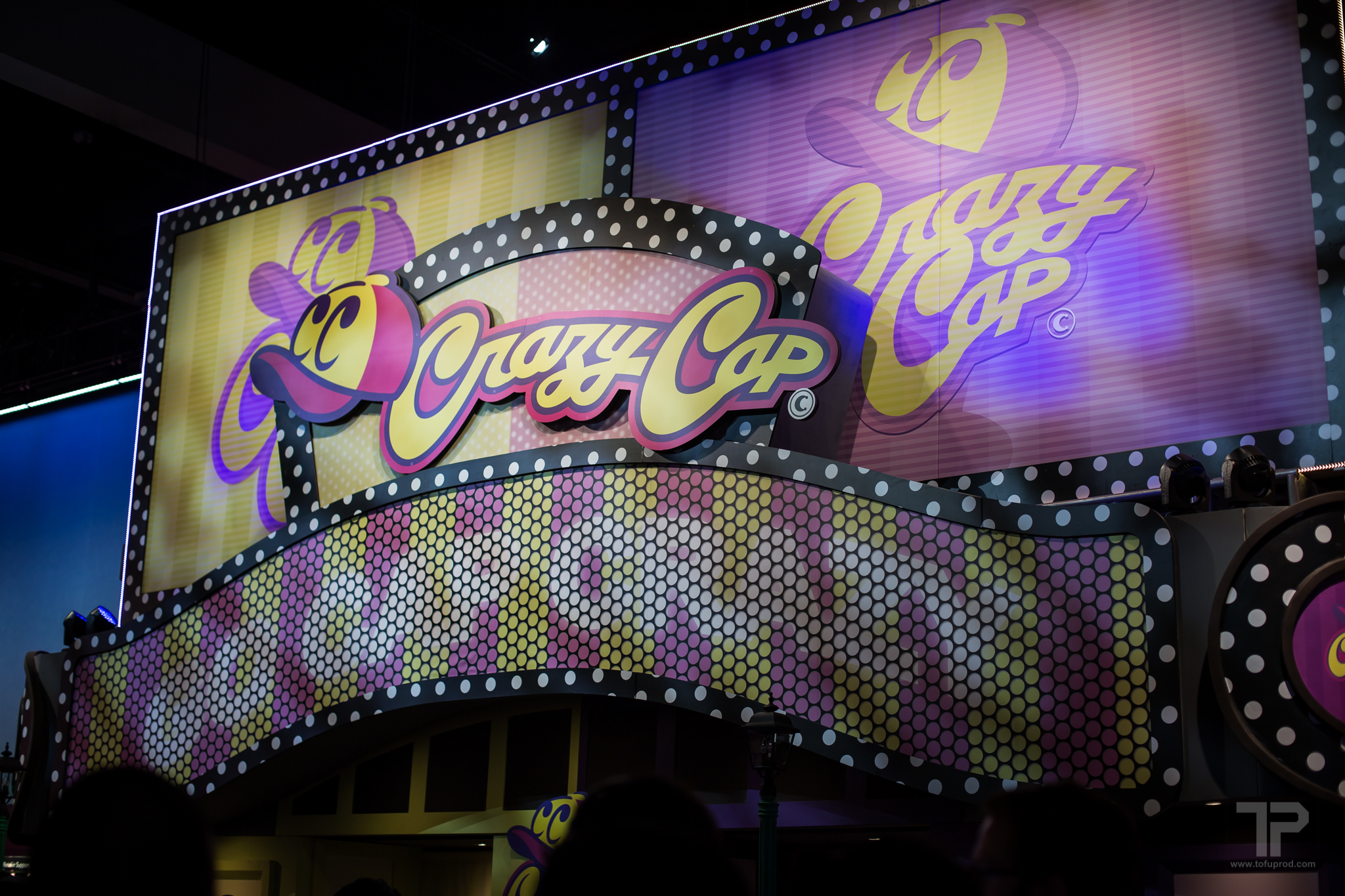
The Crazy Caps store in New Donk City recreated for E3 2017

The game was teased via the Nintendo Switch console announcement trailer in 2016; in January 2017 during a Nintendo presentation, Odyssey was formally announced to be in development, and was followed shortly after with gameplay footage. A section at E3 2017 was themed around New Donk City, and was filled with kiosks that allowed people to play a demo. The announcement at E3 2017 was the most popular part of the presentation on social media and was considered the best part of the show by other attending developers. Critics also noted the game's density of secrets and noted the format of open-world exploration.

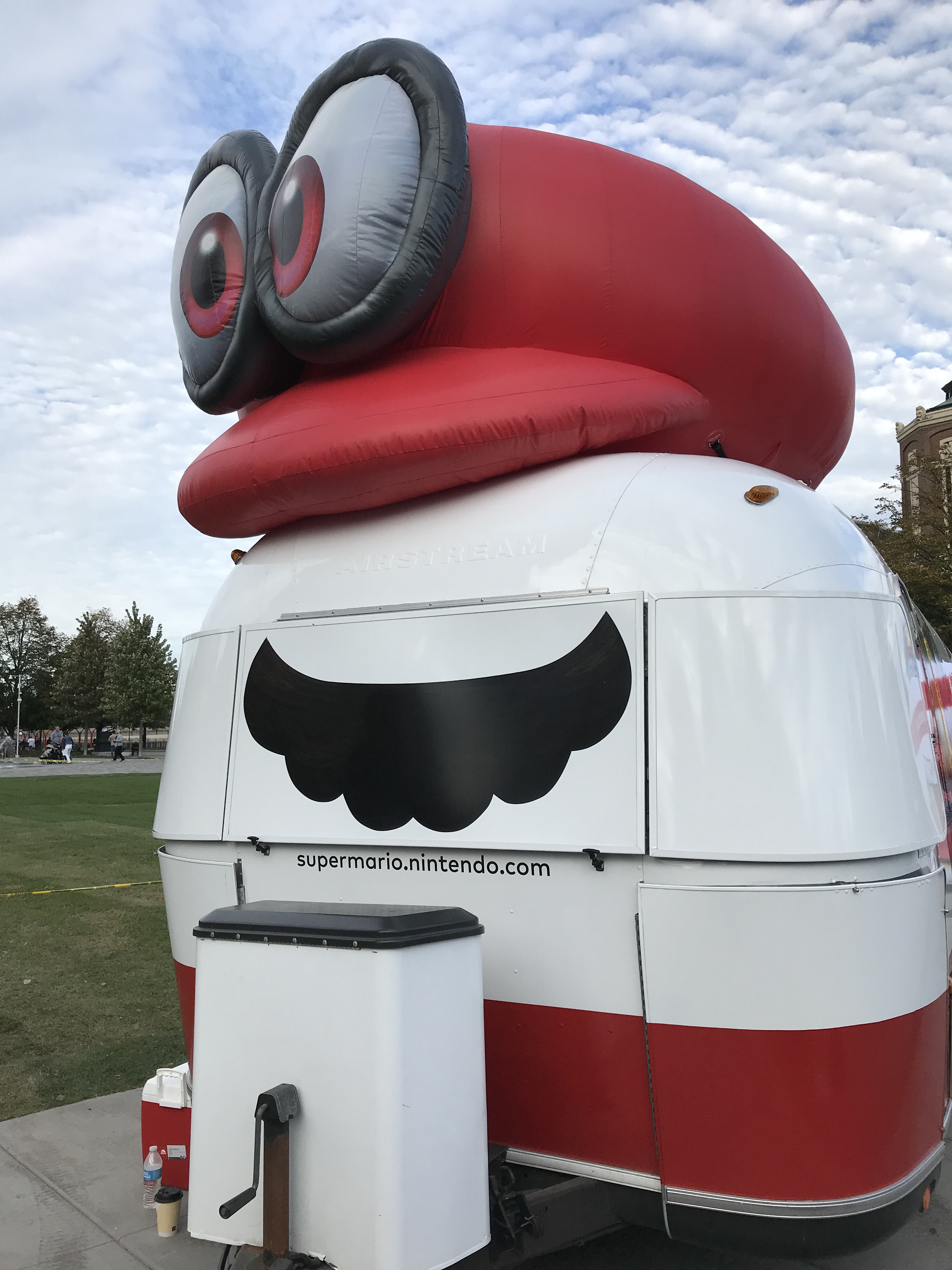
The trailer that was part of a promotional tour

In the weeks leading up to release, Nintendo of America held a cross-country promotional tour. Major stops included Los Angeles, Dallas, Philadelphia, and New York. At each stop, a demo of the game was playable.

Two weeks before the game's release, Nintendo uploaded a Broadway inspired promotional music video of "Jump Up Super Star!", which featured live-action dancers alongside a CGI animated character of Mario. The song was released on the digital music storefront iTunes shortly after and became one of the top 40 best sellers in the United States.

The game officially released October 27, 2017, alongside Amiibo of Mario, Peach, and Bowser in their respective wedding attire. In addition, a limited-time Odyssey themed Nintendo Switch was released, containing the console, Joy-Con reminiscent to the color of the character Cappy, a Switch console carrying case, and a Nintendo eShop digital download code for Odyssey. Later that December, Nintendo partnered with food manufacturing company Kellogg's to release a limited quantity breakfast cereal—"Super Mario Cereal"—in the US. The back of the box contains an NFC tag that can be scanned like an Amiibo toy, which provides exclusive in-game extras.

== Reception ==
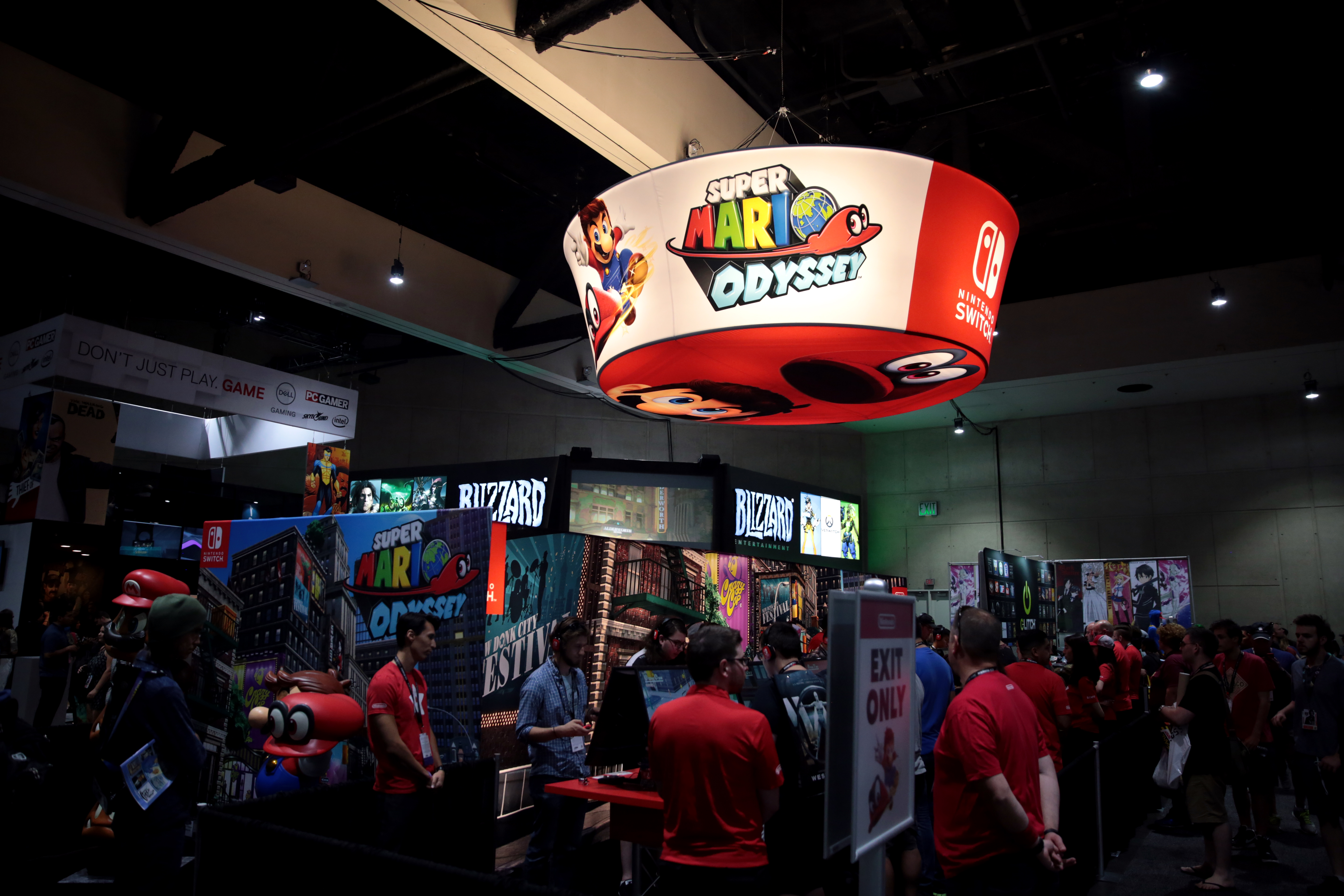
Playable demo booth for Super Mario Odyssey at San Diego Comic-Con in 2017

Reception

Aggregate scores
Aggregator	Score
Metacritic	97/100 (Note: Based on 114 reviews)
OpenCritic	98% recommend (Note: Based on 157 reviews)

Review scores
Publication	Score
4Players	90/100
Destructoid	9.5/10
Easy Allies	5/5
Edge	10/10
Electronic Gaming Monthly	10/10
Eurogamer	Essential
Famitsu	10/10, 10/10, 9/10, 10/10
Game Informer	9.75/10
GameRevolution	5/5
GameSpot	10/10
GamesRadar+	5/5
GamesTM	10/10
Giant Bomb	5/5
Hardcore Gamer	5/5
IGN	10/10
Nintendo Life	10/10
Nintendo World Report	10/10
Pocket Gamer	5/5
Polygon	9.5/10
Shacknews	9/10
The Guardian	5/5
USgamer	5/5
VideoGamer.com	10/10

Super Mario Odyssey was met with "universal acclaim", according to the review aggregator website Metacritic. As of 2025, Metacritic ranks Odyssey as the joint third-highest-rated game of all time. (Note: Super Mario Odyssey shares its status as third-highest rated game on Metacritic with Grand Theft Auto V, Super Mario Galaxy 2, Super Mario Galaxy, Metroid Prime, NFL 2K1, Perfect Dark, Halo: Combat Evolved, Grand Theft Auto III, Red Dead Redemption 2, The Legend of Zelda: Breath of the Wild, Disco Elysium: The Final Cut, and Tony Hawk's Pro Skater 3.) OpenCritic determined that 98% of critics recommended the game. As of 2025, OpenCritic ranks Odyssey as the highest-rated game of all time.

Andrew Webster of The Verge thought that the structure of the game lent itself well to the portable nature of the Switch, which players could play for either long sessions in order to follow the missions, or in short bursts while collecting "Power Moons", which the author compared to the "shrines", or hidden mini-dungeons, which were scattered throughout Breath of the Wild. Despite the praise, Webster noted that the motion controls "felt frustratingly imprecise", preferring the accuracy of standard controls. The ability for Mario to turn into his 2D Super Mario Bros. form in certain segments was compared to the puzzles featured in The Legend of Zelda: A Link Between Worlds, while VentureBeat noted the game's similarities to the Sonic the Hedgehog series.

The staff of Edge praised the inventiveness of the game's new ideas and the risks Nintendo had taken to deviate from the established formula of Mario games, which they believed had paid off. They likened the game to Super Mario 64 and called it the spiritual successor that had previously not yet been achieved. The staff also complimented the introduction of Cappy and the capturing mechanic, which they called the most versatile ability in the Mario series to date, and enjoyed how the ability allowed Nintendo to reinvent a number of their favorite gameplay activities. Famitsu gave the game a score of 39/40, the same as Super Mario 64 and the highest score for a 3D Mario game since then. Perfect 10/10 scores were also awarded by IGN and GameSpot, who both praised the game's originality.

In contrast, Ian Dallas, the creator of What Remains of Edith Finch, gave Super Mario Odyssey a lukewarm review. He explained, "My problem with Super Mario Odyssey is that it's not actually satisfying to finish. This is not to say it isn't worth playing; it absolutely is. I just don't think it's worth finishing." Phil Hornshaw of Digital Trends gave the game 4/5 stars, saying that "Mario's first turn on the Switch is fun, but lacks the innovation and creativity of Nintendo's best." Hornshaw also noted that the "Controls and camera can be imprecise" and "frustrating".

The song "Jump Up, Super Star!" debuted at number 33 on the Billboard Japan Hot 100 for the week of November 11, 2017. In Japan, the song reached No. 1 on the Japanese iTunes Store. On the US iTunes Store, the song debuted at 25 in the "All Genres" category. Kate Higgins performed "Jump Up, Super Star!" live at The Game Awards 2017 ceremony.

=== Sales ===
Three days after release, more than two million copies of the game were sold worldwide, with 500,000 in Japan. During its launch week, the game competed with Assassin's Creed Origins, which it was narrowly outsold by in the United Kingdom. In the US and Europe, it became Nintendo's fastest-selling Super Mario game ever, with 1.1 million copies sold in the US within five days. According to The NPD Group, the game was the bestselling video game of October 2017, and was listed by Amazon as the online retailer's highest-selling game of the year. By December 2017, Super Mario Odyssey had sold 9.07 million copies worldwide, making it the bestselling game for the Switch at that time. As of December 2025, it had sold 30.27 million copies.

=== Awards ===
Entertainment Weekly and Giant Bomb both ranked the game second in their list of the "Best Games of 2017", and GamesRadar+ ranked it fourth on their list of the 25 Best Games of 2017, while Eurogamer and Polygon ranked Super Mario Odyssey third on their lists of the "Top 50 Games of 2017". Ars Technica ranked the game as their Game of the Year, while The Verge named it as one of their 15 Best Games of 2017. Readers and staff of Game Informer voted the game as the best platforming game of the year, while the former also voted it as Game of the Year, along with Best Nintendo Game. Electronic Gaming Monthly also ranked the game at number four in their list of the 25 Best Games of 2017.

The game won the award for "Best Switch Game" in Destructoid's Game of the Year Awards 2017. It also won the awards for "Best Platformer" and "Best Original Music" in IGN's Best of 2017 Awards, whereas the game's other nominations were for "Game of the Year" and "Best Switch Game". It was also nominated for "Switch Retail Game of the Year" and "Overall Game of the Year" by both reader and staff votes in Nintendo Life's Game of the Year Awards. The game won the Game of the Year award at the National Academy of Video Game Trade Reviewers award event, where it won all but one of the categories it was nominated for. Odyssey also won the awards in IGN's Best of E3 for "Best Platformer", "Best Nintendo Switch Game", and "Game of Show"; and in Destructoid's Best of E3 for "Best of Show".

List of awards and nominations
Year	Awards	Category	Result	Ref.
2017	Game Critics Awards	Best Action/Adventure Game	Won	
2017	Game Critics Awards	Best Console Game	Won	
2017	Game Critics Awards	Best of Show	Won	
2017	Golden Joystick Awards	Nintendo Game of the Year	Nominated	
2017	Golden Joystick Awards	Ultimate Game of the Year	Nominated	
2017	The Game Awards 2017	Game of the Year	Nominated	
2017	The Game Awards 2017	Best Game Direction	Nominated	
2017	The Game Awards 2017	Best Score/Music	Nominated	
2017	The Game Awards 2017	Best Audio Design	Nominated	
2017	The Game Awards 2017	Best Action/Adventure Game	Nominated	
2017	The Game Awards 2017	Best Family Game	Won	
2018	21st Annual D.I.C.E. Awards	Game of the Year	Nominated	
2018	21st Annual D.I.C.E. Awards	Adventure Game of the Year	Nominated	
2018	21st Annual D.I.C.E. Awards	Outstanding Achievement in Game Design	Nominated	
2018	21st Annual D.I.C.E. Awards	Outstanding Achievement in Sound Design	Won	
2018	SXSW Gaming Awards	Excellence in SFX	Won	
2018	SXSW Gaming Awards	Excellence in Musical Score	Nominated	
2018	SXSW Gaming Awards	Excellence in Animation	Nominated	
2018	SXSW Gaming Awards	Excellence in Gameplay	Nominated	
2018	SXSW Gaming Awards	Video Game of the Year	Nominated	
2018	Game Developers Choice Awards	Best Design	Nominated	
2018	Game Developers Choice Awards	Game of the Year	Nominated	
2018	2018 Kids' Choice Awards	Favorite Video Game	Nominated	
2018	14th British Academy Games Awards	Best Game	Nominated	
2018	14th British Academy Games Awards	Family	Won	
2018	14th British Academy Games Awards	Game Design	Won	
2018	2018 Teen Choice Awards	Choice Videogame	Nominated	
2018	BBC Radio 1's Teen Awards	Best Game	Nominated	

== Legacy ==
Since the release of Super Mario Odyssey, various other Nintendo titles, like Mario Golf: Super Rush and the Nintendo Switch and 3DS versions of Captain Toad: Treasure Tracker, have featured levels themed after Odyssey's kingdoms.

Super Mario Odyssey was announced to be one of Nintendo's games to receive a free game update to "improve playability on the Nintendo Switch 2 system". The update was released on June 3, 2025, adding support for 4K resolution, HDR and GameShare. The update was developed by Panic Button.

Several locations and characters from the game appear in The Super Mario Galaxy Movie (2026). Mario and Luigi discover and meet Yoshi in the Sand Kingdom in the film's opening. Fossil Falls appears as a separate planet where Yoshi, Toad, Baby Mario, and Baby Luigi have to evade the T-Rex. One of the game's bosses, the Ruined Dragon, makes a cameo appearance during the final battle created from Bowser Jr.'s paintbrush.

=== Modifications ===
Many user-made modifications have been made for Super Mario Odyssey, adding new features to the game, such as costumes, enemies, or entire kingdoms. In 2022, Super Mario Odyssey: Online was released, a mod that implements online multiplayer functionality into Super Mario Odyssey. The mod allows for up to ten simultaneous players to play both the hide-and-seek mode, and the main game, with game progress being synchronized across all players. The mod is popular among streamers. An upcoming mod, Super Mario Odyssey – A Galaxy Story, aims to port over enemies, game mechanics and all 42 galaxies from Super Mario Galaxy. It is scheduled to be released in 2025.

=== Research ===
A preliminary study conducted in Germany found that playing Super Mario Odyssey significantly reduced depression symptoms more than a cognitive training program ("CogPack") or standard treatments. The study, involving 46 individuals with depression, compared the effects of the video game, the cognitive program, and standard treatments, including medication and psychotherapy, over six weeks. Participants playing the video game reported higher treatment motivation and showed notable improvements in depressive symptoms. The study also assessed cognitive functions, finding improvements in visuo-spatial memory in both the video game and cognitive training groups, but more selectively in the video game group. Despite these positive results, the study had limitations like participant awareness of the group assignment and a small sample size, potentially affecting the results' generalizability.
