= Ostro (disambiguation) =

Ostro is a southerly wind of the Mediterranean.

Ostro may also refer to:

== People ==
- Hans Christian Ostrø (1968–1995), a Norwegian actor who was kidnapped and killed in Jammu and Kashmir in 1995
- Steven J. Ostro (1946–2008), American radar astronomer

== Video games ==
=== Mario franchise ===
- Birdo, the Mario-franchise character erroneously referred to as "Ostro" in the Super Mario Bros. 2 instruction manual and end credits
- The Super Mario Bros. 2 common enemy whose name is transposed with that of Birdo in the game's instruction manual

== Other meanings ==
- 3169 Ostro, an asteroid named for Steven J. Ostro
- Italian destroyer Ostro, two destroyers of the Italian Royal Navy
- Ostrobothnia (administrative region), an administrational area in Finland.

== See also ==
- Austro (disambiguation)
