= Super Mario Bros. 35th Anniversary =

Celebration of video game series

- The main and alternate versions of the logo for the anniversary
- Date: September 3, 2020 – March 31, 2021 (6 months and 4 weeks)
- Type: Anniversary event
- Motive: 35th anniversary of the Super Mario series
- Organized by: Nintendo
- Website: mario.nintendo.com

The Super Mario Bros. 35th Anniversary (Note: 35th anniversary of Super Mario Bros. (Japanese: スーパーマリオブラザーズ35周年, Hepburn: Sūpāmarioburazāzu 35-shūnen) in Japan.) was a celebration of the Super Mario video game series created by Shigeru Miyamoto. The series began with the release of Super Mario Bros. on September 13, 1985, and has since spanned over twenty games appearing on every major Nintendo video game console. Through a series of leaks initially reported by Video Games Chronicle in March 2020, plans revealed that Nintendo originally planned to celebrate the anniversary earlier in 2020; however, due to the COVID-19 pandemic, the anniversary was postponed to September that same year. The anniversary was announced in a Nintendo Direct on September 3, 2020, and ran until March 31, 2021.

Nintendo released numerous Mario titles for the Nintendo Switch during the anniversary. New games included Paper Mario: The Origami King, Super Mario Bros. 35, and Mario Kart Live: Home Circuit, while re-releases included Super Mario 3D All-Stars and Super Mario 3D World + Bowser's Fury. Additionally, a limited edition Game & Watch handheld was released, containing Super Mario Bros. and Super Mario Bros.: The Lost Levels as well as a remake of the Game & Watch game Ball. All the games received generally positive reviews from critics.

In addition to games, Nintendo partnered with many companies and brands to produce tie-in merchandise. This included the release of Lego Super Mario sets in collaboration with The Lego Group, which came with electronic figures that interact with certain parts of the set, as well as clothing and toys produced by Levi's, UHU, and Hasbro. Events such as the opening of Super Nintendo World were also held to coincide with the celebration of the anniversary.

== History ==
=== Background ===
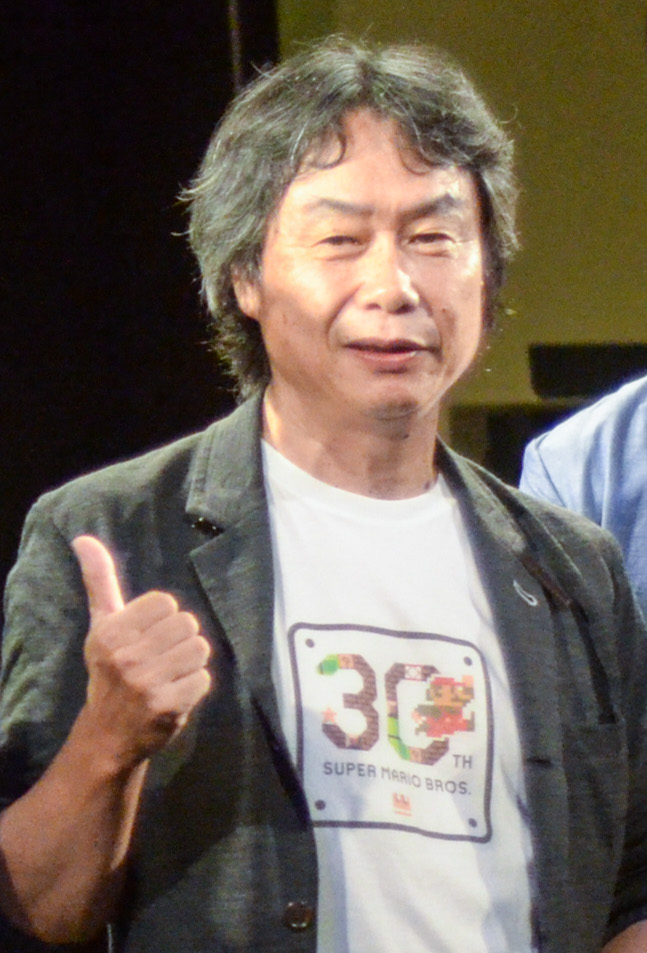
Shigeru Miyamoto seen wearing a T-shirt with the series' 30th Anniversary logo

The Super Mario series was first created in 1985 when Shigeru Miyamoto developed and produced Super Mario Bros. for the Famicom in Japan and Nintendo Entertainment System elsewhere. The game became a critical and commercial success, which warranted two more sequels on the NES. The next entry in the series was Super Mario World for the Super Nintendo Entertainment System, developed in 1990. The game upgrade the series from 8-bit to 16-bit graphics, as well as introduced series staple features such as Yoshi. In 1996, Super Mario 64 was released as a launch title for the Nintendo 64, which brought the series into 3D gameplay. The game became a critical success and is often noted as influential within the gaming industry. The 3D gameplay of Mario 64 was then greatly expanded upon with two successors, Super Mario Sunshine (2002) for the GameCube and Super Mario Galaxy (2007) for the Wii. The series has since released over twenty entries split between 2D and 3D gameplay, with at least one released for every major Nintendo video game consoles.

The Super Mario series was first celebrated in 2005, for the series' 20th anniversary. In late July 2005, Nintendo announced the release Mario Tennis: Power Tour and Dr. Mario & Puzzle League for September 13 that year in Japan, as well as the re-release of the Famicom Mini version of Super Mario Bros. for the Game Boy Advance. In addition, they also released a special edition version of the Game Boy Micro styled after the color scheme of a Famicom controller to commemorate the anniversary.

The series celebrated its 25th anniversary in 2010. To commemorate the anniversary, a limited edition of version of Super Mario All-Stars bundled with a CD and artbook was released called 'Super Mario All-Stars 25th Anniversary Edition' for the Wii. Furthermore, other titles such as Mario series titles received additional reprints at Toys "R" Us for the anniversary. Similar to the 20th anniversary, limited edition consoles were also commissioned for the celebration specifically for the Wii and DSi, the DSi of which was a promotional deal with Japanese 7-Eleven. An event was held at the Nintendo World Store in New York City which featured Shigeru Miyamoto and former Nintendo of America president Reggie Fils-Aimé, cutting a cake themed after levels from Super Mario Bros..

The series celebrated its 30th anniversary, starting in April 2015. For the anniversary Nintendo released Super Mario Maker in September, which became a big part of the celebration. The game also spawned two amiibo styled after 8-bit Mario called the Mario 30th Anniversary Amiibo, which were sold separately or in bundles. Other than games, Nintendo also teamed up with other brands to mark the anniversary such as Hot Wheels, Romain Jerome and Moschino.

=== Anniversary ===
The anniversary celebration unofficially started on March 10, 2020, when Nintendo and The Lego Group teased a collaborative partnership on Twitter with a short video of a Mario figurine with an LED display, under the name of Lego Super Mario. By March 12, a trailer was released on the Lego YouTube account, depicting multiple interactive playsets based on level themes in the Super Mario franchise.

In late March 2020, Video Games Chronicle reported on rumors of a big celebration for the series' anniversary, in which Nintendo would re-release games from the series' 35-year-old backlog. Additionally, VentureBeat claimed they received information from sources that the celebration was originally scheduled to be held at Nintendo's E3 2020 presentation, however due to the COVID-19 pandemic the event was cancelled and the celebration would have to be postponed. The event was also meant to tie into new details being revealed for Super Nintendo World and The Super Mario Bros. Movie in partnership with Universal Pictures. Furthermore, information later added on the official website for a Super Mario Maker 2 event suggested that some plans had originally been planned for as early as April 2020. Supplementary sources corroborated by Eurogamer and Gematsu claimed that one of the games in the celebration was a collection of remasters of 3D Mario titles reminiscent of Super Mario All-Stars, with sources claiming the game contained Super Mario 64, Super Mario Sunshine and Super Mario Galaxy. Other sources also claimed that there were a new Paper Mario game as well as a "deluxe" port for Super Mario 3D World which were also being developed for the anniversary. A Paper Mario game, Paper Mario: The Origami King, was later announced in May 2020 in a standalone trailer. In July, Nintendo fans discovered a hidden Twitter account for the anniversary celebration, the account of which shared the same email address as other official Nintendo Twitter accounts.

On September 3, Nintendo showcased a variant of their Nintendo Direct online presentations, titled Super Mario Bros. 35th Anniversary Direct. Within the direct, several of the previously rumored games were announced, including the rumored "All-Stars 2" revealed as Super Mario 3D All-Stars. The original Super Mario All-Stars was also re-released as a part of the Nintendo Switch Online service. Other games not mentioned by insiders were also announced, including Super Mario Bros. 35, Mario Kart Live: Home Circuit and the Game & Watch: Super Mario Bros. handheld. In addition to the new titles, the direct also featured a recap of previously announced promotions within the year in the form of events in other Nintendo games as well as merchandise provide by collaborations with other companies. The Direct ended with a montage of most of the mainline Mario releases since 1985, omitting Super Mario Bros.: The Lost Levels, (Note: Outside of the direct, these games do appear on official timelines, with The Lost Levels replacing Bros. 2 in Japan.) Super Mario Land 2: 6 Golden Coins, Super Mario Galaxy 2, New Super Mario Bros. 2, and New Super Mario Bros. U. After the direct ended, it was announced that the celebration would last until March 31, 2021. Nintendo later added that 3D All-Stars, Super Mario Bros. 35, and the Game & Watch handheld were all to cease sales after the end of the celebration.

On September 13, Nintendo launched two websites for Super Mario Bros. and The Lost Levels, alongside printable manuals for the respective games. The websites acted as tie-in promotions for the then upcoming Game & Watch: Super Mario Bros. handheld, as well as celebrating the anniversary as a whole.

== Games ==
=== New releases ===
==== Paper Mario: The Origami King ====
A Paper Mario game had initially been rumored by both Eurogamer and Video Games Chronicle on March 30. The report claimed that the game would "return to the franchise's roots" and would offer an experience closer to Paper Mario and Paper Mario: The Thousand-Year Door compared to the other entries in the series. Originally, Origami King was meant to be revealed at E3 2020 alongside the other games meant for the anniversary. However, the announcements were split from the main celebration, partially due to Nintendo's transition to work from home development. On May 14, the game was announced as Paper Mario: The Origami King via a standalone trailer on their YouTube page. A second trailer, release on June 12, detailed further gameplay features of the game. The game was released worldwide on July 17.

In Paper Mario: The Origami King, Mario and Luigi are invited by Princess Peach to celebrate the "Origami Festival". However, the celebration ends up being a trap set up by King Olly, a being made from origami. Once inside the castle, Mario learns that Peach was turned into an origami by Olly, and captured Bowser to force him watching his minions getting turned into his army, the Folded Soldiers, so Mario and his new partner Oliva set out across five regions of the Mushroom Kingdom to save Princess Peach and stop Olly and his Folded Soldiers from turning the kingdom and its residents into origami. The gameplay consists of action-adventure game exploration in a linear open world where Mario can use mechanics such as the Confetti Bag or the 1000-Fold Arms to solve puzzles or to progress forward. When encountering an enemy, the game takes on turn-based battle system where Mario must line-up up enemies on a circular grid before attacking them. At one point, Mario can temporarily have partners, like Bobby the Bob-omb, Professor Toad, and Kamek. Unlike the previous entries, Sticker Star and Color Splash, the game was received more well by critics, with many praising the game's storytelling, worldbuilding, as well as the game's open world design. However, the game was also criticised for its departure of the battle system seen in older titles from the Paper Mario series, specifically the game's lack of experience points. The Origami King was nonetheless a best-seller, becoming the second best-selling Paper Mario game, the other being Super Paper Mario.

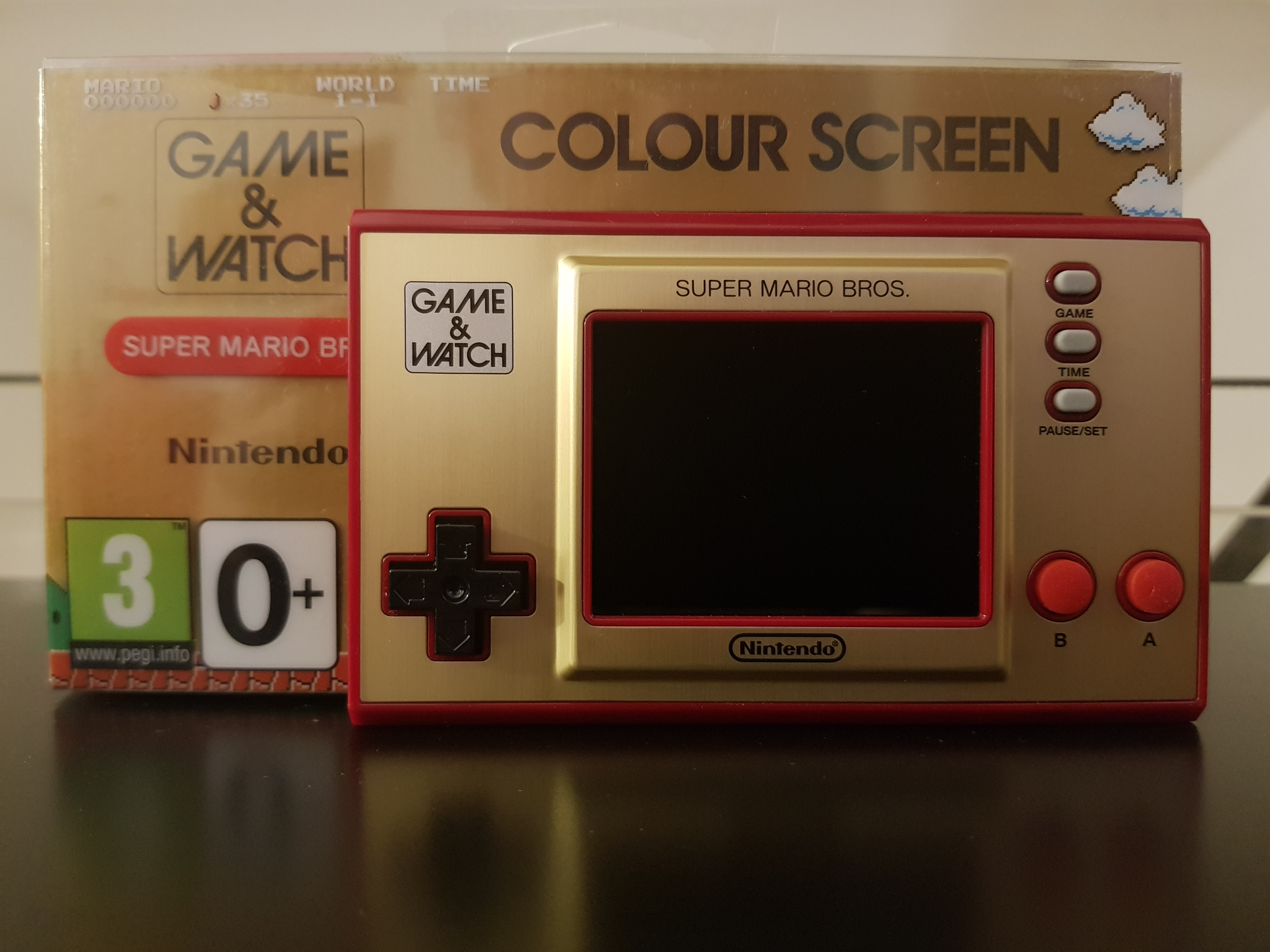
The Game & Watch: Super Mario Bros. handheld released for the anniversary

==== Game & Watch: Super Mario Bros. ====
At the beginning of the 35th Anniversary Direct, a limited edition Game & Watch system was announced called Game & Watch: Super Mario Bros., with the release date of November 13. The handheld itself is based on a modified Widescreen Game & Watch handheld, modified with a d-pad and a full-color LCD screen. The system was compiled with three games; Super Mario Bros., Super Mario Bros.: The Lost Levels and a modified version of the Game & Watch title Ball that replaced Mr. Game & Watch with Mario. The handheld also contains a built-in clock. In addition, the announcement stated that the system contained 35 easter eggs, in reference to the anniversary. Nintendo went on to state that the Game & Watch: Super Mario Bros. handheld would be one of the anniversary games to be discontinued after March 31, 2021. Critical feedback for the Game & Watch was positive, revering the device for its presentation, secrets to find, as well as the clock feature. However, the handheld was criticised for the button designs, tiny screen and the lack of more games in the compilation.

==== Super Mario 3D World + Bowser's Fury ====
A port for the Wii U title Super Mario 3D World were part of the initial anniversary rumor reports in March 2020. The game was announced in the anniversary direct as Super Mario 3D World + Bowser's Fury on September 3, with a release date of February 12, 2021. A second trailer was later released in January 2021 which expanded upon details within the port. The game features an enhanced version of Super Mario 3D World, compliments with updated graphics and features. The port also comes packaged with a new story campaign called Bowser's Fury, which changes from the gameplay from 3D World to an open world platformer. Alongside the release of the game, two new amiibo based on Cat Mario and Cat Peach were released separately. These amiibo can be used in game to grant the player power-ups.

Super Mario 3D World's gameplay remains mostly untouched in the port, whilst also adopting gameplay featured in Super Mario Odyssey. The characters' run and climb speed were increased and a mid-air dive were implemented into the player's move set. Additionally, all Captain Toad levels has all players controlling all members of the Toad Brigade. The game's multiplayer mode was also improved to allow for online play. The port features a new snapshot mode that allows users to take in-game screenshots and add stamps to the photo, replacing the game's Miiverse functionality. In Bowser's Fury, Mario and Bowser Jr. team up as they traverse across a location known as Lake Lapcat to put a stop to Fury Bowser, a form of Bowser who has been enveloped by a controlling black sludge. Mario is tasked with collecting tokens known as Cat Shines to destroy the black sludge that appears throughout the world and free Bowser. The credits sequence show that Bowser Jr. was responsible for the game's event, painting his father in black paint simply for a prank. Bowser's Fury adapts 3D World's gameplay into an open-world environment, with segmented areas replacing individual levels. Bowser Jr. can act as a guide to secrets around the game, which can be toggled. Alternatively, Jr can be used in two player mode. Occasionally, Fury Bowser will appear and causes fiery blocks to rain down. The player can choose to wait out the event or fight Bowser by becoming Giga Cat Mario if the player has enough Cat Shines.

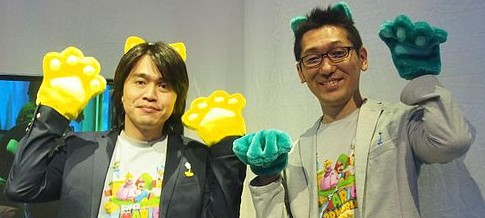
Super Mario 3D World's director Koichi Hayashida and producer Yoshiaki Koizumi

The bundle was met with overwhelming positive feedback, with critics praising 3D World's upgraded features and local multiplayer, although cited that the online mode was not always reliable. On the other hand, Bowser's Fury was praised for the world's layout, platforming challenges and the Fury Bowser battles. However, the game was criticised for the Fury event's repetitiveness and the AI of Bowser Jr.

==== Super Mario Bros. 35 ====
In the same anniversary direct, an online multiplayer battle royale titled Super Mario Bros. 35 was announced. The game was announced to be free to download for Nintendo Switch Online subscribers and was to release October 1. Similar to 3D All-Stars, the game was announced to be unavailable to play after March 31, 2021. The game had been in development before developer Arika's last title for the Nintendo Switch, Tetris 99. Likewise to Tetris 99, the game held a handful of special events during the game's lifespan, particularly for Halloween and the game's final day. After the game's servers were shut down on April 1 another battle royale developed by Arika, Pac-Man 99, took its place on the Nintendo eShop.

The gameplay of the game consists of 35 individual players controlling Mario through levels as they appeared in the original Super Mario Bros., with the goal of being the last Mario standing. The player can defeat enemies that appear through the levels to send them to other players to hinder their progress, as well as increase the initial player's timer. Coins can be collected in the levels as well to spend on a roulette wheel which can grant the player a power-up to help aid against defeating enemies. The critical reception for the game was positive, praising the game for innovation and the twist on the gameplay, but was criticised for the game's simplicity and repetition.

==== Mario Kart Live: Home Circuit ====
Mario Kart Live: Home Circuit was another game to feature in the direct. Nintendo were approached by Velan Studios with a prototype of a remote control car hooked with a camera. Nintendo approved the idea and allowed Velan Studios to primarily develop the game. Deviating from other titles in the Mario Kart series, the game utilises mixed reality that allows players to use toy radio-controlled cars to race around the player's home. The karts are fitted with a camera that stream video to the Nintendo Switch, with the video feed uses augmented reality to display AI opponents and obstacles. The player is tasked with placing four gates acting as checkpoints to map out a course. The game can also be played in co-op, where up to four individual RC cars can around the track. Home Circuit was released in two sets on October 16, 2020, with the sets depicting Mario or Luigi as the drivers of the karts. The game received praise by critics for the game's implementation of the mixed reality technology and incentivising players to be creative when making tracks. However, critics noted that the game was fairly demanding for space and felt that the multiplayer mode was very costly.

==== Super Mario 3D All-Stars ====
"I hope that people who played these games before will play them again, like I'm doing. It not only brings back some nostalgic memories, but it may allow them to find there are plenty of fun things they haven't yet discovered."

— Kenta Motokura, 2020 CNN interview

Another game heavily reported on by Video Games Chronicle was a collection of 3D Super Mario games similar in vein to Super Mario All-Stars. Dubbed All-Stars 2 in the media, the game was reported to contain enhanced versions of Super Mario 64, Super Mario Sunshine and Super Mario Galaxy. Initial reports claimed Super Mario Galaxy 2 would also be a part of this collection, however these claims were later withdrawn. In the anniversary direct, the game was officially announced as Super Mario 3D-All Stars with a release date of September 18. The game featured graphical enhancements and upscaling the aspect ratios for all three games as well as updated controls. After the direct, Nintendo stated the game would be a limited release and would be unavailable for purchase both physically and digitally after March 31, 2021. In an interview with CNN, 3D All-Stars's producer Kenta Motokura encouraged people who had previously played these games, as to bring back memories and to discover new things about the games. During an interview conducted by The Washington Post with Super Mario series directors, Motokura stated that they wanted to stay true to the games' original spirit and design. To do so, the development team interviewed many of the original members who worked on the three games, asking for insight for the significance of each game.

The gameplay of all three games make use of emulation, with the games being ported into high-definition. Sunshine and Galaxy were ported into a 16:9 aspect ratio at 1080p for the Nintendo Switch's TV Mode and at 720p for handheld mode, meanwhile 64 was ported into 4:3 aspect ratio at 720p for both modes. Galaxy received a control remapping, with motion controls functionality with the Switch Joy-Con for the TV Mode and touchscreen capabilities for handheld mode. The collection also featured the soundtracks for all three games, which could be played with the screen off. The game received favorably by critics, praising the game for its updated graphics, fixed camera controls and updated controls. The compilation was criticised however, for the game's simplistic presentation and the limited release for the game. Additional criticism was made against the compilation's lack of Galaxy 2.

=== Re-releases ===
==== Super Mario All-Stars ====
As well as the new games, Nintendo announced the re-release of the 1993 title Super Mario All-Stars, which became available immediately after the direct. The game was added to the Nintendo Switch Online's Nintendo Classics library, allowing the game to be played online in both single and co-op play.

== Merchandise ==
=== Lego ===
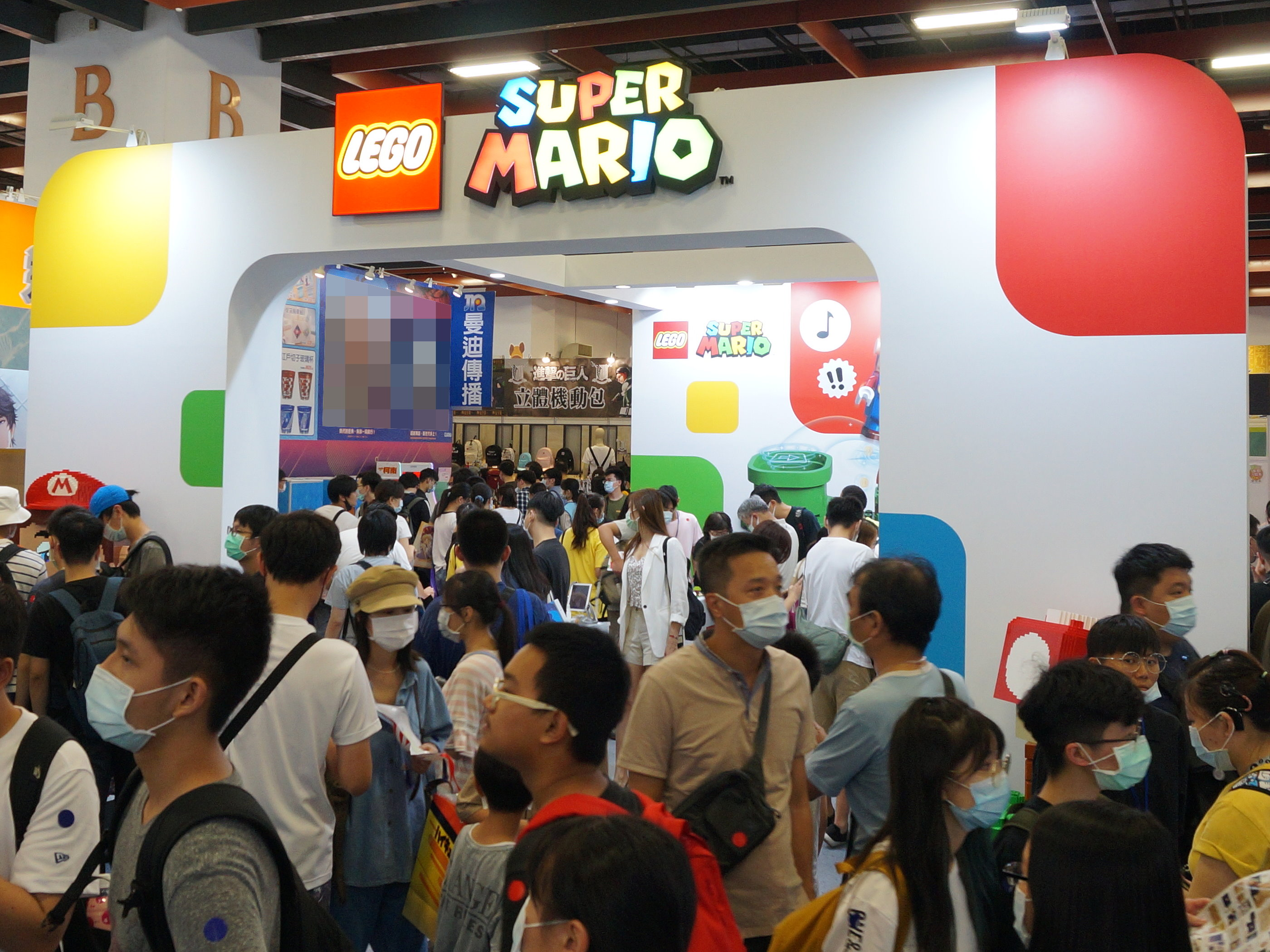
A Lego Super Mario booth at Lego Trading (Taiwan)

In March 2020, it was revealed Nintendo collaborated with the Lego Group to bring a new Lego theme to celebrate the anniversary, titled Lego Super Mario. This theme is a combination of a video game and a Lego set, with an electronic Mario figurine that can interact with barcodes on structures resembling Mario features like Warp Pipes and ? Blocks, which can make sound effects, in linear Super Mario style levels. In total, the Lego theme has 11 sets, (Note: There are two extra sets obtained under different means.) 4 packs pertaining to cosmetic changes to the Mario figurine, and a blind bag collection of 10 Mario enemies. It was released on August 1, 2020.

More Lego information was revealed in July 2020, when Nintendo unveiled a miniature Lego Nintendo Entertainment System and CRT TV replica, which displayed Super Mario Bros. While not associated with the Lego Super Mario theme, the set can interact with it. By having the Mario figurine on top the TV, it can make sound effects by cranking a lever. This set also released on August 1.

=== Clothing ===
In April 2020, both Uniqlo and Levi announced a range of Mario branded clothing. Uniqlo revealed a line of T-Shirts with Mario on them, a notable t-shirt being a timeline of mainline Mario games. Levi, added a wide selection of clothing including hats, overalls, tops, and hoodies, all of which were patterned with Super Mario characters. During the Direct, Nintendo announced two more clothing brands that were collaborating, Black Milk, which make clothing for women, launched October 6, 2020, and Puma, which released basketball shoes branded with Super Mario 64, Sunshine, and Galaxy iconography.

=== Toys ===
Hasbro began collaborating with Nintendo, with their plans being revealed in July 2020 and released the following month. These plans turned out to be Mario themed Jenga and Monopoly tabletop games, complete with unique Mario styled gimmicks. Another company involved in the collaboration was Jakks Pacific, which sold multiple Mario characters figurines throughout the year, both new and old. One of the figurines was a 12-inch tall figurine of Mario, fitted with sound effects and music. When Super Mario 3D World + Bowser's Fury was announced, additional info was released outside the Direct, revealing the game would be launched alongside Cat Mario and Cat Peach amiibo.

=== Other ===
In August 2020, the German adhesives manufacturing company, UHU, released a line of adhesive products plastered with Mario characters. In the same month, Nintendo unveiled two special edition wired controllers branded with Mario designs. One is red and gold and the other a render of Peach's Castle. Three additional Mario controllers were announced and released in the following October. After the Direct, the Nintendo online store update to include a wide range of merchandise, including plushes, mugs and clothing. Additionally, on the My Nintendo service, members could do missions in exchange for rewards including a pin set of different Mario games. The Nintendo eShop updated its theme to Mario iconography. Various retailers offered pre-order bonuses for Super Mario 3D All-Stars. Black Screen Records released a Super Mario 64 vinyl record album titled "Hang on to Your Hats" for the Video Game Jazz Orchestra band.

== Events and partnerships ==
=== Real world ===
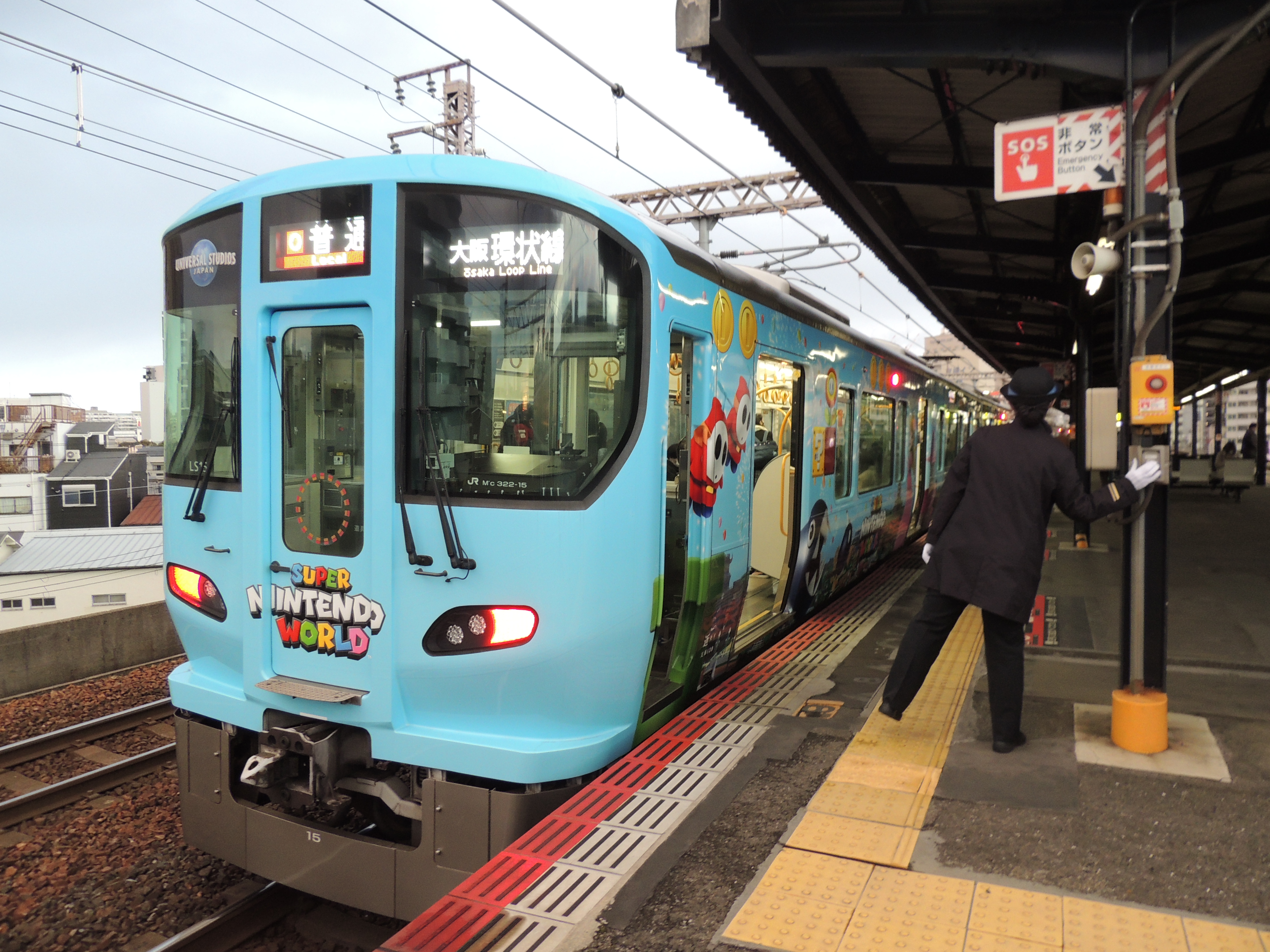
A JR-West 323 series advertising Super Nintendo World at Universal Studios Japan

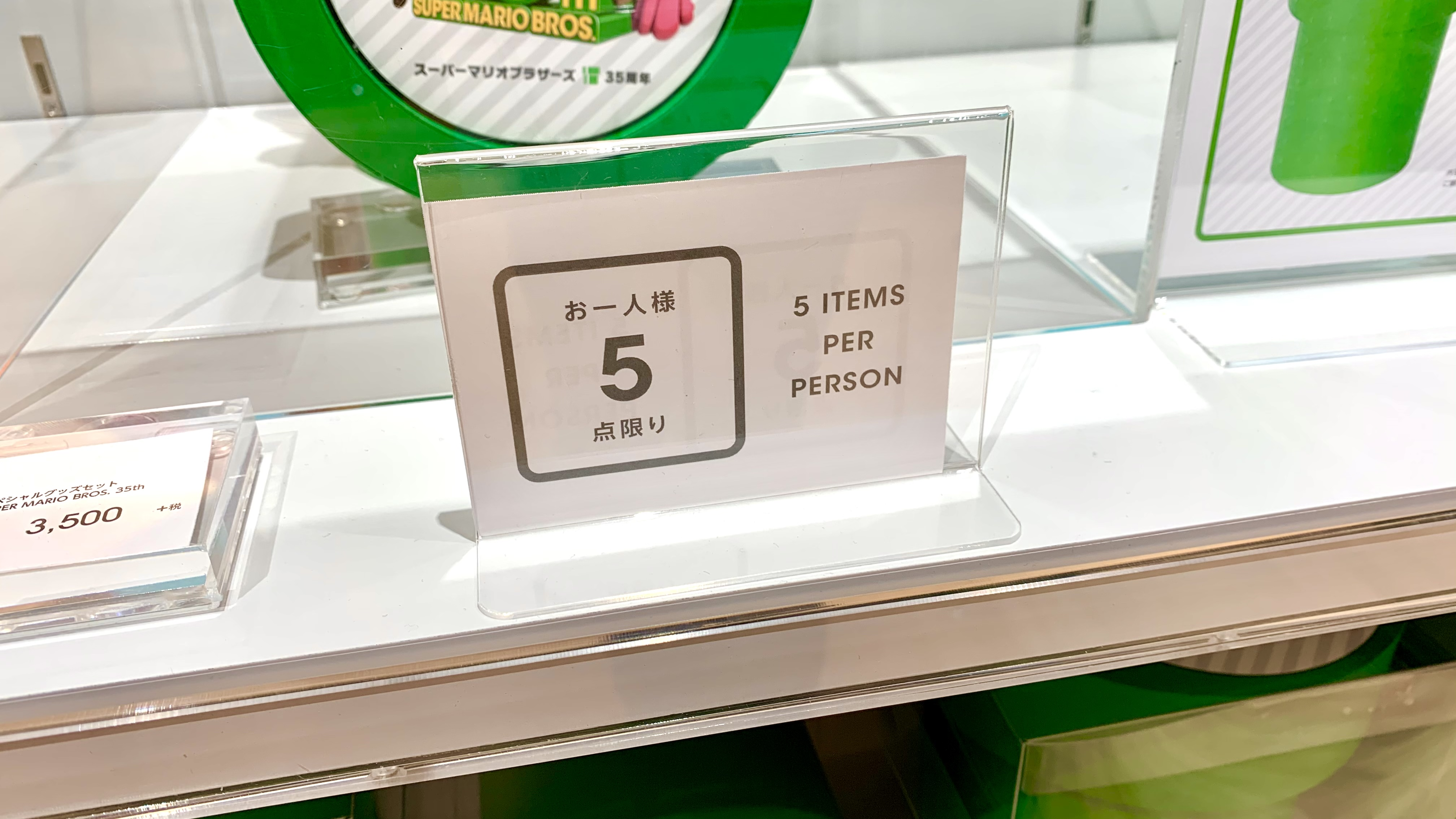
A purchase limit for anniversary merchandise at the Nintendo Tokyo store

Originally, Super Nintendo World at Universal Studios Japan was going to become open to the public in early 2020, in conjunction with the 2020 Tokyo Summer Olympics and to celebrate the anniversary. However, due to the COVID-19 pandemic in Japan both events were postponed to 2021. Another facility at Universal Japan, a Mario themed store and cafe, opened on October 16. The store sold a wide array of Mario merchandise and the cafe sold pancakes and power-up shaped smoothies. Construction on the Universal Hollywood version of the park began in August 2020. Nintendo reopened their New York store, after lockdown and vandalism, and released more Super Mario merchandise. On the day of the anniversary, September 13, Nintendo launched two websites for Super Mario Bros. and Super Mario Bros. The Lost Levels in Japan. These were meant to pay tribute to these games, and allow for people to look at an overview of the games, as well as download the original instruction manuals. In Japan, Nintendo commissioned special Mario animations for JR East trains. These animations are for weekly random trivia questions, which rotate out each Monday. On September 30, Cold Stone Creamery announced a partnership with Nintendo, which ran until December 15, 2020. The partnership involves three different Mario-inspired desserts for purchase and consumption; a Rainbow Road inspired ice cream filled cake, with the addition of the ice cream served in a Super Mario Odyssey themed cup and a rainbow star milkshake. In November, Nintendo partnered up with Amazon to produce Super Mario themed boxes that can be served to customers randomly through their orders.

=== In games ===
Many other Nintendo games featured in-game events related to the anniversary. Animal Crossing: New Horizons received Super Mario items in March 2021, Splatoon 2 hosted a Splatfest for "Super Mushrooms vs. Super Stars" in January 2021, (Note: Additionally, T-Shirts were released for the Splatfest.) Mario Kart Tour released two new characters in the form of Mario and Donkey Kong Jr. in their original 16-bit sprites from Super Mario Kart, Super Smash Bros. Ultimate hosted a Super Mario themed tournament in December as well as an Origami King spirit event, and Super Mario Maker 2 hosted special Ninji speedruns.

== See also ==
- Year of Luigi
- Pokémon 25th Anniversary
- Pac-Man 40th Anniversary
