= Mario 3D =

Mario 3D may refer to:

- Super Mario 3D Land, 2011
- Super Mario 3D World, 2013
- Super Mario 3D All-Stars, 2020
