= Game & Watch: Super Mario Bros. =

2020 Game & Watch game

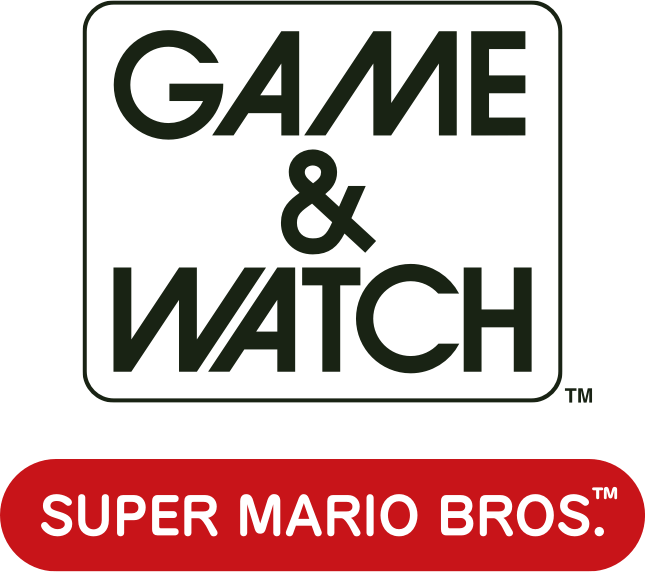
- The system playing Super Mario Bros.
- Developer: Nintendo
- Publisher: Nintendo
- Composer: Koji Kondo
- Series: Super Mario
- Platform: Game & Watch
- Release: WW: November 13, 2020
- Genre: Platform
- Modes: Single-player, multiplayer

Game & Watch: Super Mario Bros. (Note: Japanese: ゲーム＆ウオッチ スーパーマリオブラザーズ, Hepburn: Gēmu & Uotchi: Sūpā Mario Burazāzu) is a limited-edition Game & Watch system developed and published by Nintendo, released on November 13, 2020. The system features three Nintendo games: Super Mario Bros. (1985), Super Mario Bros.: The Lost Levels (1986) (using its Japanese title, Super Mario Bros. 2), and a Mario-themed version of Ball (1980). The system was released for the 35th anniversary of the Super Mario series and the 40th anniversary of the Game & Watch line.

== Gameplay ==
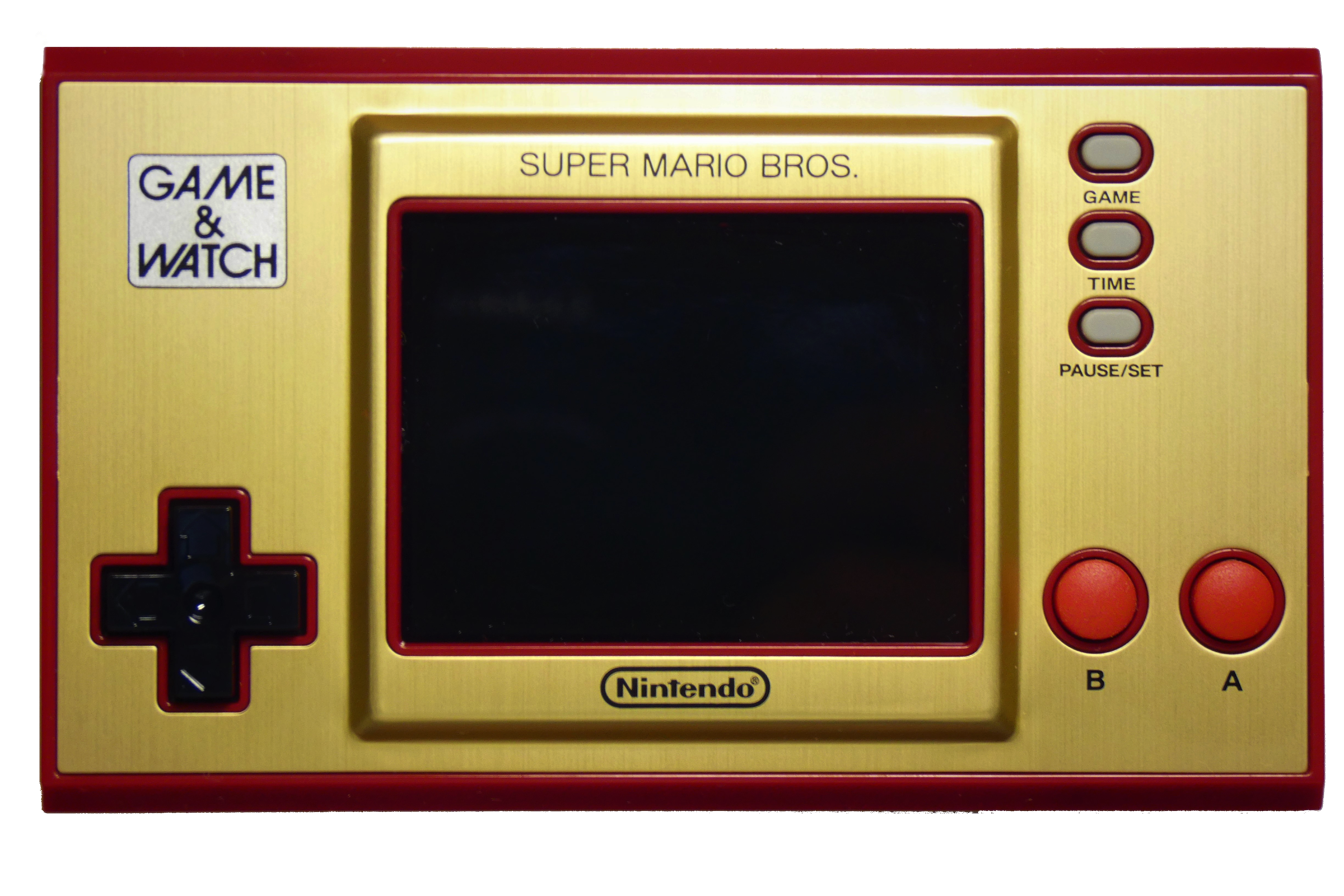
The system's button layout

Game & Watch: Super Mario Bros. is primarily a side-scrolling platformer in which the player needs to make it to the far right of levels. The system also includes the Game & Watch game Ball, updated to make the character that appears in the game be Mario (with Luigi also being playable through an Easter egg) - this makes it more similar to another Game and Watch game, Mario the Juggler, than the original Ball, which featured a more generic player character. Despite being replaced, this character can be seen on the game select screen. The system also includes a clock function, which features 35 "little touches" (animations) and Easter eggs.

Multiple Easter eggs were also added throughout all three games, such as being able to give Mario infinite lives in Super Mario Bros. and The Lost Levels by holding the A button upon starting the game and being able to access and listen to the Mario Drawing Song (which included a language error) by holding down the A button in the clock mode.

== Development ==
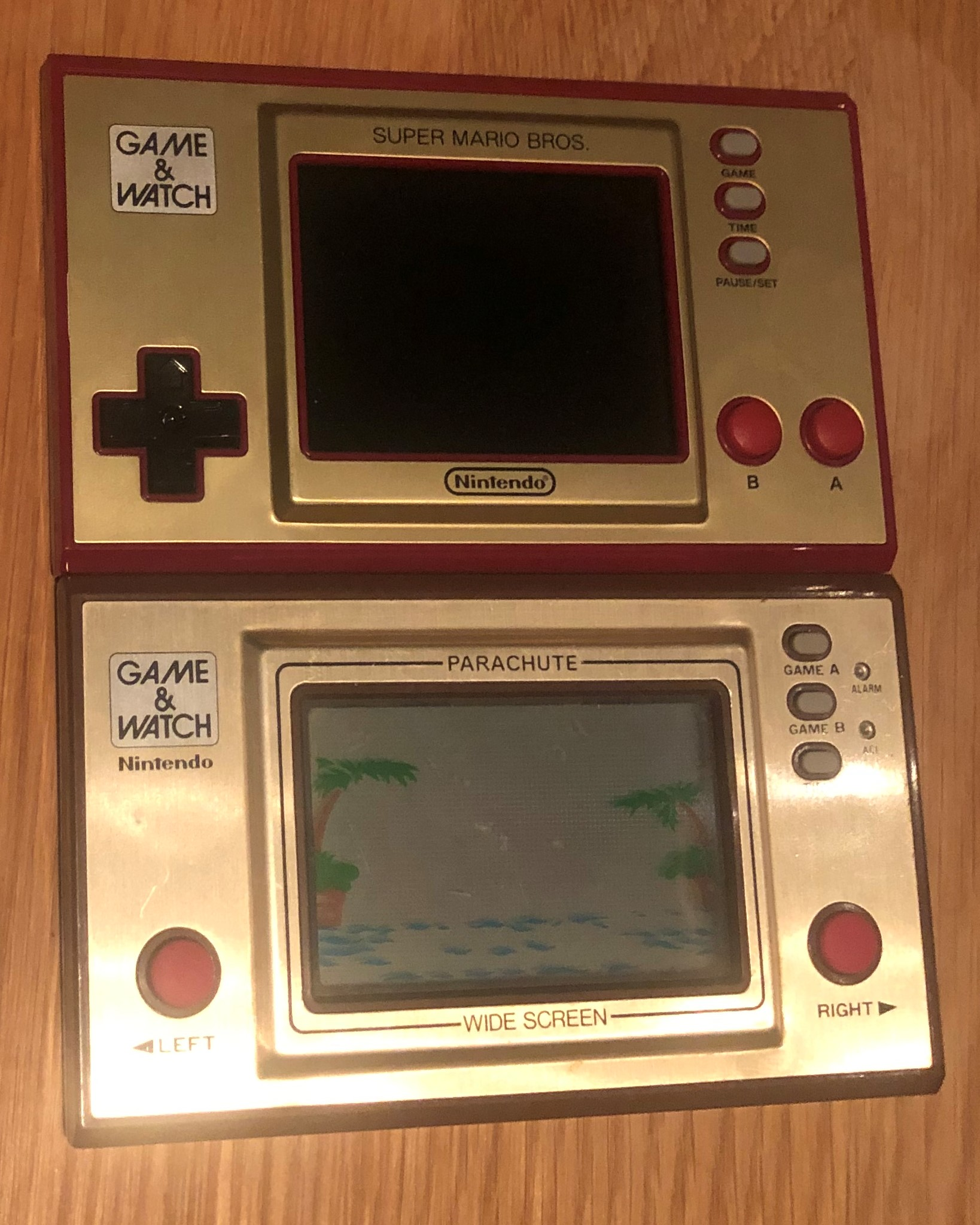
Game & Watch: Super Mario Bros. (top) next to the 1981 Widescreen Game & Watch game, Parachute (bottom)

Game & Watch: Super Mario Bros. was announced in a Nintendo Direct held to celebrate the 35th anniversary of the Super Mario series, where its content, release date, and launch price of $50 were first unveiled. Due to lack of authorization by the Federal Communications Commission (FCC), pre-orders for the system were delayed in the United States. A more in-depth trailer for the system was posted later on September 10. Two Japanese tie-in websites were also launched following the system's announcement, one for Super Mario Bros. and one for Super Mario Bros.: The Lost Levels. The system was discontinued on March 31, 2021, following the end of the celebration period. According to Nintendo of America president Doug Bowser, the 35th anniversary products were discontinued because of the 35th anniversary being a celebration that was intended to be unique. He said that he considered the concept successful and also said how Super Mario 3D All-Stars sold over 2 million copies in the time frame. He also stated that limited time releases were not planned to be used as a marketing strategy for future anniversaries.

== Specifications ==
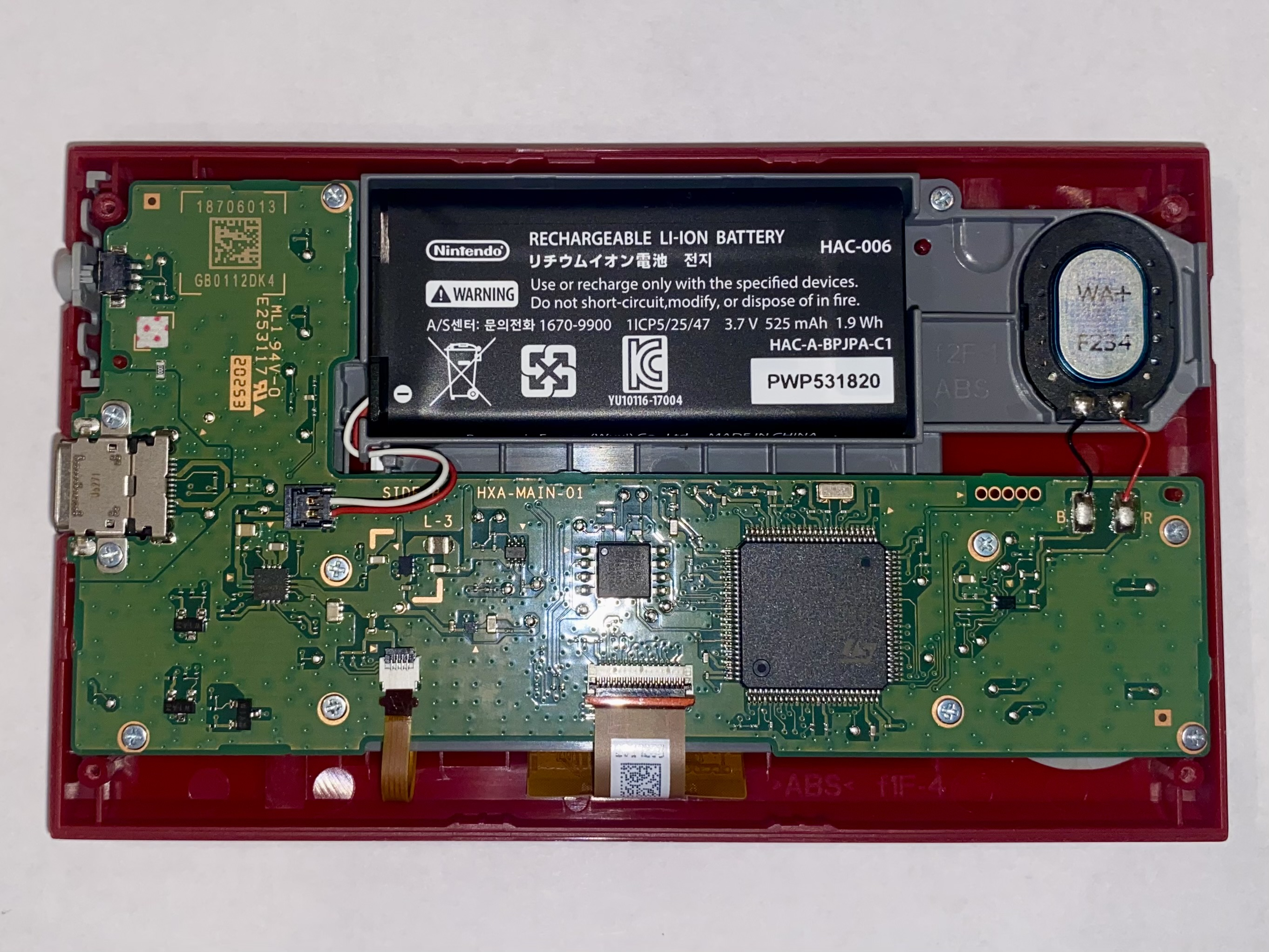
The inside of the system

The game is powered by a STM32H7B0VBT6 microcontroller, which consists of an ARM Cortex-M7 core, two banks of 256KB Flash (only 128 KB is documented) as discovered by the Game & Watch modding community, 1380 KB of SRAM, and 1 MB of Serial Flash. The screen is 60 mm (2.36 in) diagonal with a 320x240 resolution.

The game's hardware is modelled after the Widescreen Game & Watch series, but unlike the original Widescreen systems, the system's A and B buttons are moved to the right side to be like the Nintendo Entertainment System controller, and includes a D-pad and a full-color LCD screen. It has a built-in lithium-ion battery, identical to that found in the Nintendo Switch Joy-Con controllers, which is estimated to last 8 hours. The system weighs 0.15 pounds and shipped with a USB-C charging cable. Unlike prior Game & Watch systems, the system does not have a kickstand. The system also has a power button.

== Reception ==
Reception

Review scores
Publication	Score
IGN	9/10
Nintendo Life	7/10
PCMag	3.5/5
Shacknews	8/10

Seth Macy, writing for IGN, gave Game & Watch: Super Mario Bros. a 9/10, and labeled it as an editor's choice. Macy stated that he was surprised by the quality of the hardware, and said that, due to the quality, is an "appealing way to play decades-old games". Macy, reviewing the feel of the system's hardware, said that the metal surface it is made out of doesn't attract fingerprints, something he said other handheld systems have an issue with. Macy also stated that the tactile rubber the system's buttons are made of feels "really solid". Macy also praised the button inputs for being "high quality", citing "no unintended inputs".

Blake Morse of Shacknews gave the system an 8/10, praising it for looking "gorgeous", the hidden secrets it contains, and the watch feature, but criticizing the audio and how the down on the d-pad could "function better".

Writing for Mashable, Adam Rosenberg said that the "squishy-feeling directional pad and A/B buttons" weren't the best way to play Super Mario Bros. and The Lost Levels, but said that the "budget-friendly gift item" would "delight any Nintendo-loving fanperson". Rosenberg also praised the system's clock.

Nintendo Life's Damien McFerran praised the system's backlit LCD screen, the clock feature, and said that it emulates Super Mario Bros. and The Lost Levels "very well", but criticized the lack of a kickstand and questioned why only three games were included. McFerran said that older video game players would "love the nostalgia factor", and that it would be "of interest" for younger players.

Chris Plante, in a review for The Verge, called the hardware "well built", and said that the D-pad is "firm and responsive" and that the A and B buttons are "soft but not mushy". Plante noted how after clearing Super Mario Bros.'s first level, his hands felt "achey", and that after multiple levels, his thumbs "cramped". Plante said that the discomfort he experienced with the system was due to the Game & Watch consoles being designed to play more simple games, such as the included Ball.

When reviewing the system for CNET, Scott Stein stated that the system is an "unexpectedly satisfying mash-up" and also said that "it feels really good to play on", citing that the D-pad, A and B buttons are "very-well placed". Stein also criticized that consumers only got 3 games for the Game & Watch's launch price of $50, and said that it should have included more Game & Watch games.

=== Sales ===
One day after the system's announcement, it was sold out of stock on the Japanese My Nintendo store, and shortly after on the UK My Nintendo store. Shortly after the system's announcement, pre-orders were sold out in most Australian retailers. Darren Calvert of Nintendo Life said that to get the system, consumers need to "beat the scalpers". On the day of the system's release, Game & Watch: Super Mario Bros. was sold out on Amazon, GameStop, the Nintendo store, Walmart, and Deep Discount, but they were quickly restocked.
