= Super Mario 3D =

Super Mario 3D may refer to the following video games:

- Super Mario 3D All-Stars
- Super Mario 3D Land
- Super Mario 3D World
