= Super Mario All-Stars =

1993 video game compilation

- North American SNES box art
- Developer: Nintendo EAD
- Publisher: Nintendo
- Director: Takashi Tezuka
- Producer: Shigeru Miyamoto
- Programmer: Toshihiko Nakago
- Artists: Shigefumi Hino; Naoki Mori; Soichiro Tomita; Kenta Usui
- Composers: Koji Kondo; Soyo Oka
- Series: Super Mario
- Platforms: Super NES, Wii
- Release: Super NES: JP: July 14, 1993; NA: August 11, 1993; UK: September 24, 1993; BR: December 1993; PAL: December 16, 1993; Wii: JP: October 21, 2010; EU: December 3, 2010; NA: December 12, 2010
- Genre: Platform
- Modes: Single-player, multiplayer

Super Mario All-Stars (Note: Known in Japan as Super Mario Collection (スーパーマリオコレクション)) is a 1993 platform game compilation developed and published by Nintendo for the Super Nintendo Entertainment System (SNES). It contains remakes of four Super Mario games released for the Nintendo Entertainment System (NES) and the Famicom Disk System: Super Mario Bros. (1985), Super Mario Bros.: The Lost Levels (1986; released as Super Mario Bros. 2 in Japan), Super Mario Bros. 2 (1988), and Super Mario Bros. 3 (1988). As in the original games, players control the Italian plumber Mario and his brother Luigi through themed worlds, collecting power-ups, avoiding obstacles, and finding secrets. The remakes feature updated graphics—including the addition of parallax scrolling—and music, modified game physics, a save feature, and bug fixes.

Nintendo Entertainment Analysis & Development developed the compilation after completing Super Mario Kart (1992), at the suggestion of the Mario creator, Shigeru Miyamoto. No longer restricted by the limitations of the 8-bit NES, Nintendo remade them for the 16-bit SNES. The developers based the updated designs on those from Super Mario World (1990) and strove to retain the feel of the original games. Nintendo released Super Mario All-Stars worldwide in late 1993 and rereleased it in 1994 with Super Mario World included. It was The Lost Levels' first release outside Japan; it was not released on the NES in Western territories because Nintendo deemed it too difficult at the time.

Super Mario All-Stars is one of the best-selling Super Mario games, with 10.55 million copies sold by 2015. Critics considered it one of the best SNES games and praised the updated graphics and music, but criticized its lack of innovation. All-Stars served as a basis for later Super Mario rereleases and was described by Famitsu as a model for video game remakes. It was rereleased twice for the anniversary of Super Mario Bros.: in 2010 (the 25th anniversary) in a special package for the Wii, and in 2020 (the 35th anniversary) for the Nintendo Switch as part of the Nintendo Classics service. The Wii rerelease sold 2.24 million copies by 2011 but received mixed reviews, with criticism for its lack of new games and features.

== Content ==
Comparison of the NES version (top) and the Super Mario All-Stars version (bottom) of Super Mario Bros. Note the more detailed environment and background of the latter.

Super Mario All-Stars is a compilation of the first four games in the Super Mario series—Super Mario Bros. (1985), Super Mario Bros.: The Lost Levels (1986), Super Mario Bros. 2 (1988), (Note: In the Japanese version, The Lost Levels is referred to as Super Mario Bros. 2, while the international Super Mario Bros. 2 is called Super Mario USA. See #Development and #Release for more information.) and Super Mario Bros. 3 (1988)—originally released for the 8-bit Nintendo Entertainment System (NES) and the Family Computer Disk System. Additionally, a two-player bonus game based on Mario Bros. (1983) can be accessed from Super Mario Bros. 3. The games are faithful remakes featuring the original premises and level designs intact. They are 2D side-scrolling platformers where the player controls the Italian plumber Mario and his brother Luigi through themed worlds. They jump between platforms, avoid enemies and inanimate obstacles, find hidden secrets (such as warp zones and vertical vines), and collect power-ups like the mushroom and the Invincibility Star.

Super Mario Bros., The Lost Levels, and Super Mario Bros. 3 follow Mario and Luigi as they attempt to rescue Princess Toadstool from the villainous Bowser, with the player stomping on enemies and breaking bricks as they progress. Super Mario Bros. 2 features a different storyline and gameplay style: Mario, Luigi, the Princess, and Toad must defeat the evil King Wart, who has cursed the land of dreaming. In this game, the player picks up and throws objects such as vegetables at enemies. The player selects one of the four characters from an in-game menu at the start of each life and can exit at any time by pausing.

The games feature updates that take advantage of the 16-bit hardware of the Super Nintendo Entertainment System (SNES), ranging from remastered soundtracks to revamped graphics and the addition of parallax scrolling. Game physics were slightly modified and some glitches, such as the Minus World in Super Mario Bros., were fixed. The difficulty level of The Lost Levels was slightly reduced: poison mushroom hazards, which can kill the player, are easier to distinguish, and there are more 1-ups and checkpoints. All-Stars includes the option to save player progress, which the original games lack. Players can resume the games from the start of any previously accessed world, or in The Lost Levels, any previously accessed level. Up to four individual save files can be stored for each game.

== Development ==
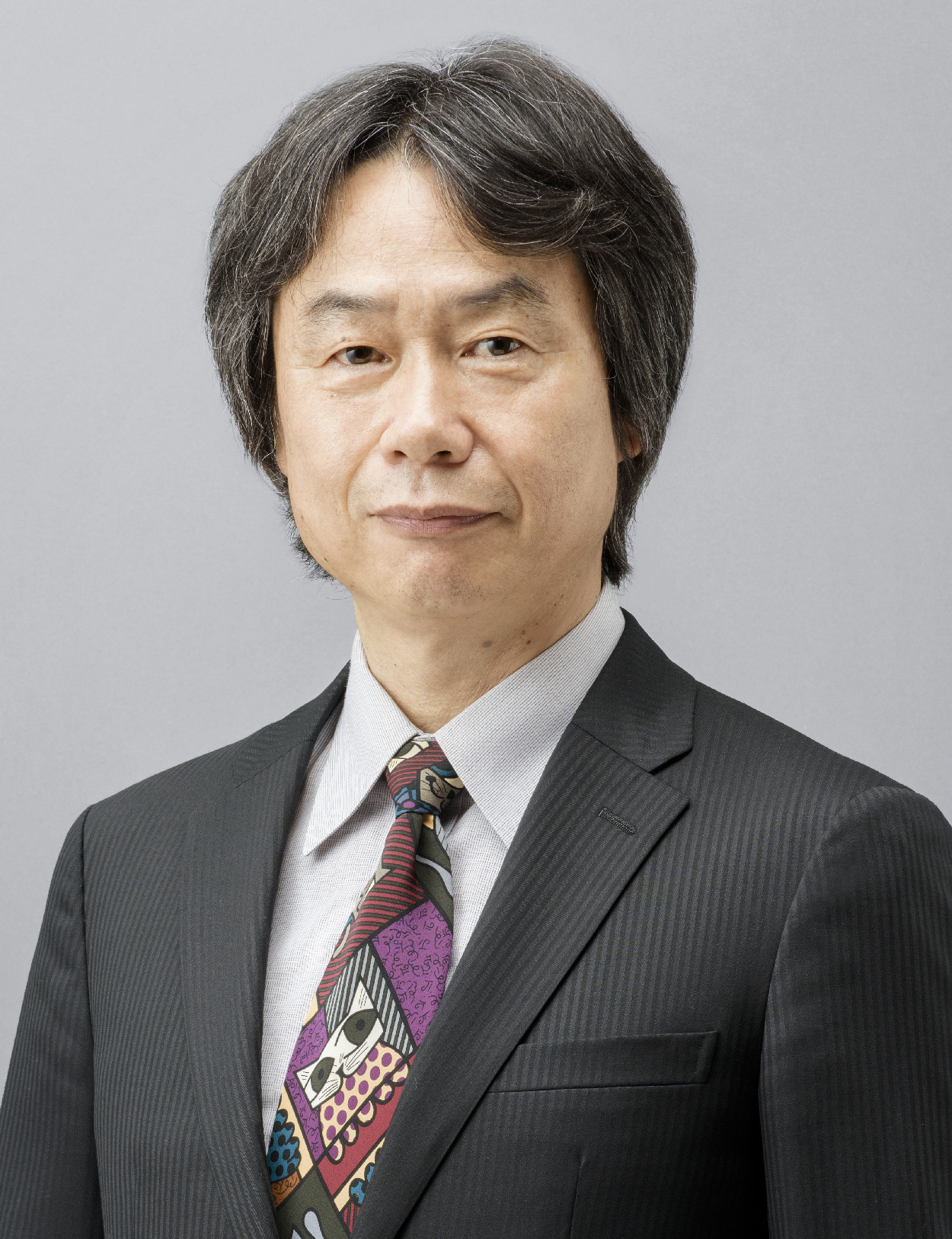
Shigeru Miyamoto in 2015

Super Mario All-Stars was developed by Nintendo Entertainment Analysis & Development, a former game development division of Japanese publisher Nintendo. It had the working title Mario Extravaganza as, according to Nintendo president Satoru Iwata, "It was a single game cartridge packed full of the first ten years of Nintendo's rich history."

The concept emerged after the completion of Super Mario Kart (1992). The next major Mario game, Yoshi's Island (1995), was still in production, creating a gap in Nintendo's release schedule. Mario creator Shigeru Miyamoto suggested developing a "value pack" containing all the Super Mario games. According to assistant director and designer Tadashi Sugiyama, Miyamoto's idea was to give players a chance to experience The Lost Levels. Nintendo had deemed The Lost Levels, released in Japan as Super Mario Bros. 2 in 1986, too difficult for the North American market and instead released a retrofitted version of the game Doki Doki Panic (1987). As such, it had not attracted a large audience. Rather than simply transfer the NES games to a SNES cartridge, Nintendo remade them for SNES.

One of the first tasks the developers accomplished was updating and reworking the graphics for the SNES. The more powerful hardware gave the developers more colors to use in Mario's world. Designer Naoki Mori recalled feeling intimidated, as it was only his third year at Nintendo and he had been tasked with updating its flagship series. The artists based their designs on those from the SNES game Super Mario World (1990) and added a black outline around Mario to make him stand out against the backgrounds. For black backgrounds like those in castles and bonus areas in Super Mario Bros., Mori and Sugiyama added details such as portraits of Bowser and Mario. The team strove to retain the feel of the original games by leaving level designs and Mario's movement unaltered. To preserve the gameplay, they added no new animations or actions.

Alterations were made by hand, and Sugiyama ran the original Super Mario Bros. while he worked on the remake so he could compare them side by side. Staff who worked on the original games were involved and consulted during development. The team preserved glitches they deemed helpful, such as a way to generate infinite lives in Super Mario Bros.; however, for that glitch, they limited how many lives the player could earn. Sugiyama recalled the team fixed glitches they thought would hinder players' progress, although this created some differences in the controls. To make the games easier, the team increased the number of lives they start with. They also added a save-game option, a feature made possible by the recent development of battery backup cartridges. Save points were added after each level in The Lost Levels to reduce its difficulty. While Mori helped with the other remakes, he avoided debugging The Lost Levels because it was so difficult.

== Release ==
Nintendo released Super Mario All-Stars in Japan on July 14, 1993, in North America on August 11, 1993, and in Europe on December 16, 1993. In Japan, it was released as Super Mario Collection. The compilation marked the first time The Lost Levels was released outside Japan. Between September and October 1993, Nintendo Power held a contest in which players who reached a specific area in The Lost Levels would receive a Mario iron-on patch. The compilation became the SNES's pack-in game and sold 10.55 million copies by 2015, including 2.12 million in Japan, making it one of the bestselling Super Mario games. In the United Kingdom, it was the top-selling video game of September 1993.

Nintendo re-released Super Mario All-Stars in December 1994 as Super Mario All-Stars + Super Mario World, which adds Super Mario World. Super Mario World is largely identical to the original, but Luigi's sprites were updated to give him a distinct appearance and not just a palette swap of Mario. A version of Super Mario Collection was also released on Nintendo's Satellaview, a Japan-exclusive SNES add-on allowing users to receive games via satellite radio.

In 2010, for the 25th anniversary of Super Mario Bros., Nintendo released Super Mario All-Stars 25th Anniversary Edition (Super Mario Collection Special Pack in Japan) for the Wii in Japan on October 21, in Europe on December 3, and in North America on December 12. The 25th Anniversary Edition comes in special packaging containing the original Super Mario All-Stars ROM image on a Wii disc, a 32-page Super Mario History booklet containing concept art and interviews, and a soundtrack CD containing sound effects and 10 tracks from most Mario games up to Super Mario Galaxy 2 (2010). This version sold 2.24 million copies—920,000 in Japan and 1.32 million overseas—by March 2011. The compilation was again rereleased in 2020 on the Nintendo Switch for the original game's 35th anniversary, coming as part of the subscription-based Nintendo Classics service.

== Reception ==
=== Original release ===
Reception (SNES)

Aggregate score
Aggregator	Score
GameRankings	90%

Review scores
Publication	Score
Computer and Video Games	94%
Edge	8/10
Electronic Gaming Monthly	9/10, 10/10, 9/10, 9/10
Famitsu	8/10, 10/10, 8/10, 6/10
Official Nintendo Magazine	95/100
SNES Force	92%

Award
Publication	Award
Golden Joystick Awards	Game of the Year (console)

The compilation received critical acclaim. Reviewers thought it was a must-have that represented the SNES library at its finest, and would occupy players for hours, if not days. Nintendo Magazine System (NMS) estimated it could entertain players for up to a year. A critic from Computer and Video Games (CVG) described Super Mario All-Stars as the Super Mario director's cut, bringing fans updated graphics and audio in addition to a game (The Lost Levels) few had experienced. A reviewer from Electronic Gaming Monthly (EGM), overwhelmed by the improvements, called it a "masterpiece from beginning to end".

Critics praised the collection's games as excellent remakes, stating they aged well and appreciating the effort that went into retrofitting them for the SNES. For AllGame, retrospectively reviewing the version including Super Mario World, the compilation represented "the absolute pinnacle of the 2D platform genre". Critics said the games played just as they did on the NES and retained what made them great. EGM's reviewers were satisfied the various secrets were left intact. Nintendo Power wrote the games got better with time, while EGM and CVG suggested players abandon the antiquated NES games for the SNES upgrade. Although one of the NMS reviewers admitted to preferring Super Mario World, citing the compilation's less instinctive controls and somewhat simplistic graphics, he said Super Mario All-Stars was still worth buying.

Reviewers liked the updates the games received in the transition to the SNES. Nintendo Power, for instance, praised the addition of a save feature, believing it would give players who never finished the games a chance to do so. The updated graphics were praised; NMS's reviewers admired the attention to detail, which they said made the compilation worth buying, and AllGame called the visuals colorful and cartoonish. CVG thought the backgrounds could have benefited from more detail, but GamePro thought they were detailed enough. Reviewers offered praise for the updated soundtracks as well. For EGM, the audio enhanced the experience, and GamePro noted the addition of echo and bass effects.

Criticism of Super Mario All-Stars generally focused on its lack of innovation. Aside from the 16-bit updates, save feature, and (for American audiences) The Lost Levels, Nintendo Power wrote, the compilation did not present anything new, a sentiment CVG echoed. "[I]f the best cart around is a compilation of old eight-bit games," wrote Edge, "it doesn't say much for the standard of new games, does it?" One reviewer in the Japanese magazine Weekly Famicom Tsūshin said that while the games were fun and nostalgic, he found it too expensive at a retail price of ¥9,800.

Reviewers also disagreed over which game in the compilation was best. One EGM reviewer argued Super Mario Bros. 2 was, but another critic and Nintendo Power said that honor went to The Lost Levels. NMS, CVG, and Edge, however, criticized The Lost Levels for its difficulty, with Nintendo Magazine System viewing it as just an interesting bonus. Edge said the compilation was worth buying for Super Mario Bros. and Super Mario Bros. 3, but not Super Mario Bros. 2 because the reviewer found its gameplay lacking fluidity and the level design poor.

=== 25th Anniversary Edition ===
Reception (25th Anniversary Edition)

Aggregate score
Aggregator	Score
Metacritic	70/100 (Note: Score based on 29 reviews)

Review scores
Publication	Score
G4	3/5
GamesRadar+	4/5
IGN	7/10
Nintendo Life	5/10
Nintendo World Report	6/10
Official Nintendo Magazine	90%
The Guardian	3/5

According to the review aggregate website Metacritic, Super Mario All-Stars 25th Anniversary Edition received "mixed or average reviews". Critics were disappointed by the unaltered rerelease, which they found lazy. They expressed surprise the developers did not take advantage of the extra space Wii discs offer to add more games or use the Super Mario All-Stars + Super Mario World version. The Guardian compared the 25th Anniversary Edition unfavorably to the Wii remake of the Nintendo 64 game GoldenEye 007 (1997) released earlier that year. The writer argued that though GoldenEye offered new graphics, levels, and reasons to play, Super Mario All-Stars was just the same compilation released on the SNES in 1993. The A.V. Club went as far as to state the 25th Anniversary Edition "fails on every conceivable level, and a few inconceivable ones, too".

The Super Mario History booklet divided reviewers. Nintendo Life and The A.V. Club panned it for what they considered cheap production quality. Although Nintendo Life found it somewhat intriguing, both called the one-sentence developer comments vague and meaningless. The A.V. Club said the level design documents were "obscured by pictures, and schematics written in Japanese with no translation". Meanwhile, IGN opined the booklet failed to demonstrate Mario's importance, missing information about the Game Boy installments, Yoshi's Island, and other Nintendo games. Others found the booklet interesting; GamesRadar+ stated that for Mario fans Miyamoto's original outline "alone is worth $30".

The soundtrack CD received criticism and was viewed as a missed opportunity. Reviewers were disappointed it contained only ten tracks and that half of it was dedicated to sound effects. For instance, Nintendo Life said it "doesn't even fill half of that potential running time" of 74 minutes of CD audio. Similarly, IGN said ten tracks were not enough, including only one of the twenty tracks from Super Mario Galaxy (2007). Conversely, The Guardian said the CD would make players happy and GamesRadar+ thought it was rare for Nintendo to release game soundtracks outside Japan. GamesRadar+ said the CD helped make the compilation seem important, noting that it contained the first official release of the Super Mario Bros. "Ground Theme".

Nintendo Life wrote there was no reason for Nintendo not to add more to the compilation, suggesting it would not have taken much effort to add interviews, advertisements, and other behind-the-scenes content. Despite the general disappointment, critics said the games remained high quality. Some admitted to preferring the NES originals, but others thought the updated 16-bit graphics and addition of a save feature were great. However, some encouraged readers to purchase the games individually on the Wii's Virtual Console service instead if they had not already purchased the compilation. GamesRadar+, IGN, and Official Nintendo Magazine noted this was a cheaper way to experience them. As Nintendo World Report wrote, "in the end, the value of [Super Mario All-Stars] lies in whether you want to invest once more in these classic Mario titles."

== Legacy ==
In 1997, when the EGM staff ranked Super Mario Bros., Super Mario Bros. 2, and Super Mario Bros. 3 in its list of the best console games of all time, they specified the All-Stars edition for all three games. In the listing for Super Mario Bros. 3 (ranked at number 2), they noted, "Just a reminder: We're not including compilation games on our Top 100, or Super Mario All-Stars would be the clear-cut number-one game of all time." Famitsu called All-Stars a role model for video game remakes in a 2005 retrospective. In 2018, Complex named All-Stars the tenth-best SNES game. In 1996, GamesMaster named All-Stars the third top SNES game. In 1995, Total! named All-Stars the top SNES game on their Top 100 SNES Games writing: "This is possibly the best cartridge on any system, anywhere."

Super Mario Advance (2001) and Super Mario Advance 4: Super Mario Bros. 3 (2003), remakes of Super Mario Bros. 2 and 3 for Nintendo's Game Boy Advance, incorporate elements from the Super Mario All-Stars versions, such as the updated graphics and audio. Super Mario 3D All-Stars, a Nintendo Switch compilation of the first three 3D Super Mario games, was released for the series' 35th anniversary in 2020. According to Eurogamer, Nintendo internally referred to the compilation as Super Mario All-Stars 2 during development.
