= Australo- =

Australo- is a prefix and may refer to:

- South
- Australia

== See also ==
- Austro (disambiguation)
- Austral (disambiguation)
