= Super Mario Bros.: The Lost Levels =

- Japanese box art
- Developer: Nintendo R&D4
- Publisher: Nintendo
- Directors: Shigeru Miyamoto; Takashi Tezuka
- Producer: Shigeru Miyamoto
- Designer: Shigeru Miyamoto
- Programmers: Toshihiko Nakago; Kazuaki Morita
- Composer: Koji Kondo
- Series: Super Mario
- Platform: Famicom Disk System
- Release: JP: June 3, 1986
- Genre: Platformer
- Mode: Single-player

Super Mario Bros. 2, (Note: Japanese: スーパーマリオブラザーズ2, Hepburn: Sūpā Mario Burazāzu Tsū) known outside of Japan as Super Mario Bros.: The Lost Levels, is a 1986 platform game developed by Nintendo R&D4 for the Famicom Disk System. Like its predecessor, Super Mario Bros., players control Mario or Luigi to rescue Princess Peach from Bowser. The Lost Levels has a higher difficulty level, introducing obstacles such as the Poison Mushroom, counterproductive level warps and mid-air wind gusts. Luigi controls differently from Mario, with reduced ground friction and increased jump height. The game contains 32 levels across eight worlds, and 20 bonus levels.

Nintendo developed The Lost Levels after designing some of its levels for the Nintendo VS. System version of Super Mario Bros. It was directed by Takashi Tezuka and designed for players who had mastered the original. Nintendo released it as Super Mario Bros. 2 in Japan on June 3, 1986, but Nintendo of America deemed it too difficult and too similar to Super Mario Bros. for the North American market and released an alternative Super Mario Bros. 2 (1988) instead. The original Super Mario Bros. 2 was retitled The Lost Levels for its inclusion in the 1993 Super Nintendo Entertainment System compilation Super Mario All-Stars, its first international release. It has been rereleased for Game Boy Color, Game Boy Advance, Wii, Wii U, Nintendo 3DS, and Nintendo Switch.

Reviewers viewed The Lost Levels as an extension of Super Mario Bros, especially its difficulty progression, and appreciated the challenge when spectating speedruns. The Lost Levels gave Luigi his first unique character traits, while the poison mushroom became a recurring Mario franchise element. The Lost Levels was the bestselling FDS game, selling about 2.5 million copies. It is remembered as among the most difficult Nintendo games and recognized as a precursor to the Kaizo subculture, in which fans create and share ROM hacks featuring nearly impossible levels.

== Gameplay ==
Screenshot of gameplay from the 1986 Japanese release, showing a Poison Mushroom

The Lost Levels is a 2D side-scrolling platform game similar in style and gameplay to the original 1985 Super Mario Bros., save for an increase in difficulty. As in the original, Mario (or Luigi) ventures to rescue the Princess from Bowser. The player jumps between platforms, avoids enemies and obstacles, finds secrets (such as backwards Warp Zones and vertical vines) and collects power-ups such as the Mushroom (which makes Mario grow), the Fire Flower (which lets Mario throw fireballs), and the Invincibility Star. Unlike the original, there is no two-player mode; however, at the title screen, the player chooses between Mario or Luigi. Their abilities are differentiated for the first time: Luigi, designed for skilled players, has slower acceleration and deceleration with a higher jump height, while Mario is the opposite; he has faster acceleration and deceleration, but has a lower jump height.

The Lost Levels continues the difficulty progression from Super Mario Bros. It introduces obstacles including Poison Mushrooms, warps that return the player to previous levels, and gusts that redirect the player midair. The Poison Mushroom, in particular, works as an anti-mushroom, shrinking or killing the player character. Some levels require "split-second" precision and others require the player to jump on invisible blocks. After each boss fight, Toad tells Mario that "[their] princess is in another castle". The main game has 32 levels across eight worlds and five bonus worlds. A hidden World 9 is accessible if the player does not use a Warp Zone. Bonus worlds A through D are accessible when the player plays through the game eight times, for a total of 52 levels.

== Development ==
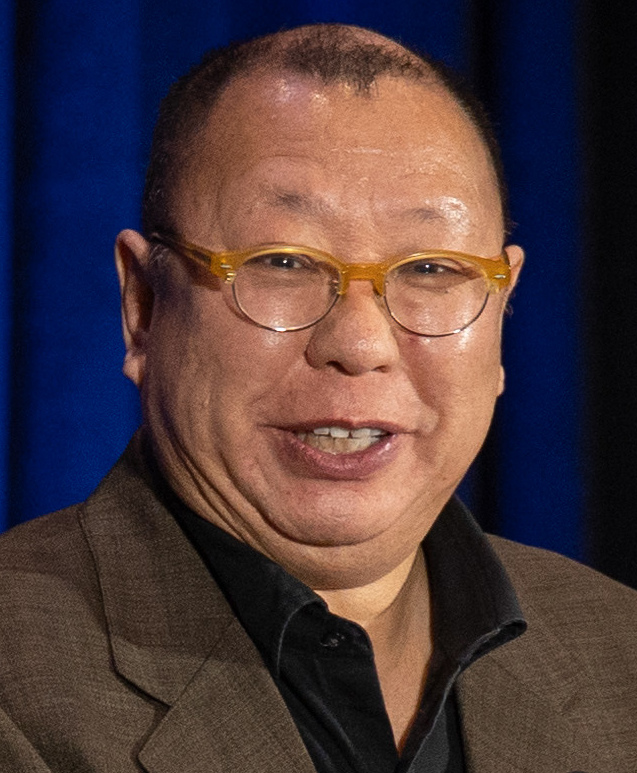
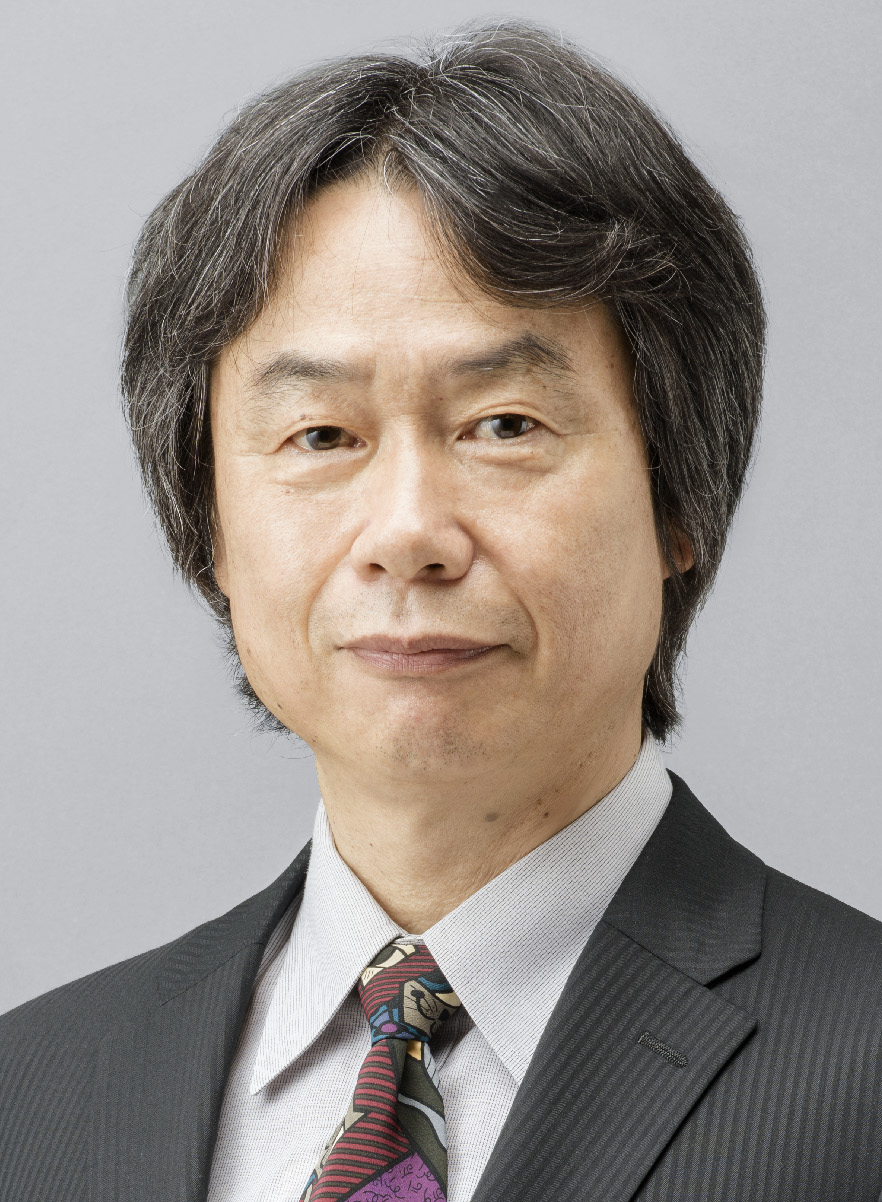
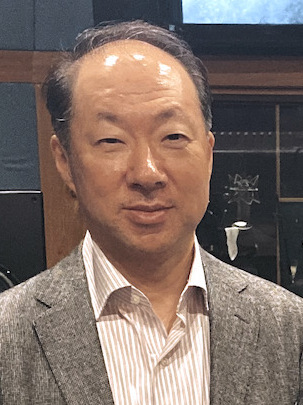
The two directors and composer pictured in 2024, 2015, and 2019, respectively: Takashi Tezuka, Shigeru Miyamoto, and Koji Kondo.

In late 1985, during simultaneous development of The Legend of Zelda (1986), the Super Mario Bros. team began creating a version of the game for Nintendo's coin-operated arcade machine, the VS. System–while also experimenting with new, challenging level designs. They enjoyed these new levels, and thought that Super Mario devotees would too. Shigeru Miyamoto, who created the Mario franchise and directed Super Mario Bros., no longer had time to design games by himself, given his responsibilities leading Nintendo's Nintendo R&D4 division and their work on The Legend of Zelda. The Super Mario sequel was delegated to its predecessor's assistant director, Takashi Tezuka, as his directorial debut. He worked with Miyamoto and the R&D4 team to develop a sequel based on the same underlying technology, including some levels directly from Vs. Super Mario Bros. Development of the Super Mario sequel began in January 1986 and lasted about four months.

The Lost Levels, originally released in Japan as Super Mario Bros. 2 on June 3, 1986, was similar in style to Super Mario Bros. but much more difficult in gameplay – "nails-from-diamonds hard", as Jon Irwin described it in his book on the sequels. Tezuka felt that Japanese players had mastered the original game, and so needed a more challenging sequel. Recognizing that the game might be too difficult for newcomers, the team labeled the packaging with "For Super Players". They also added a trick to earn infinite lives as preparation for the difficulty. Japanese commercials for The Lost Levels featured players screaming in frustration at their televisions. Otherwise, the original and this sequel are largely similar in graphics and soundtrack. After Zelda, The Lost Levels was the ninth release for the Famicom Disk System, an add-on external disk drive with more spacious and less expensive disks than the Famicom cartridges.

As I continued to play, I found that Super Mario Bros. 2 asked me again and again to take a leap of faith, and each of those leaps resulted in my immediate death. This was not a fun game to play. It was punishment – undeserved punishment. I put down my controller, astonished that Mr. Miyamoto had chosen to design such a painful game.

— Howard Phillips on his test playthrough of The Lost Levels

When evaluated for release outside of Japan, Nintendo of America believed The Lost Levels was too difficult and frustrating for the recovering American market and declined its release. Howard Phillips, who evaluated games for Nintendo of America President Minoru Arakawa, felt it was unfairly difficult, even beyond the unofficial moniker of "Nintendo Hard" that the company's other games sometimes garnered. His opinion was that The Lost Levels would not sell well in the American market. He later recalled that "few games were more stymieing. Not having fun is bad when you're a company selling fun".

Nintendo instead released a retrofitted version of Fujisankei Communications Group's Yume Kōjō: Doki Doki Panic as the region's Super Mario Bros. 2 in October 1988. Doki Doki Panic had originally been developed by Kensuke Tanabe. Tanabe was instructed to use characters from Yume Kōjō '87 and was released in Japan as a standalone game on July 10, 1987. Doki Doki Panic's characters and artwork were modified to match Super Mario Bros. before being released in America, and the re-skinned release became known as the "big aberration" in the Super Mario series. In 1992, the American Super Mario Bros. 2 was later released in Japan as Super Mario USA.

== Rereleases ==
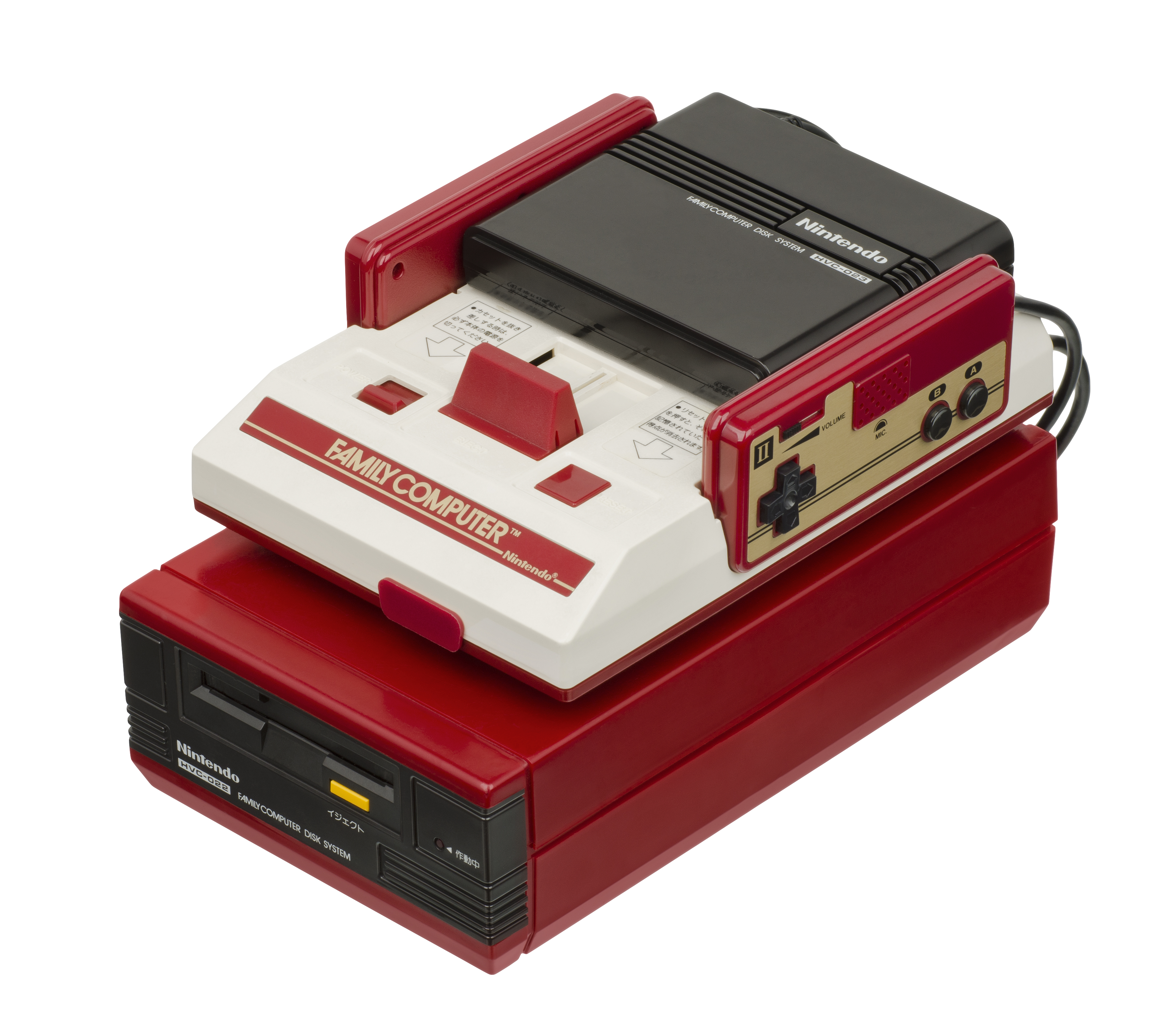
The Lost Levels was the ninth game released for the Famicom Disk System (attached below the Famicom, as pictured).

Nintendo "cleaned up" parts of the Japanese Super Mario Bros. 2 and released it in later Super Mario collections as The Lost Levels. Its North American debut in the 1993 Super Mario All-Stars collection for the Super Nintendo Entertainment System featured updated graphics (including increased visibility for the Poison Mushroom) and the ability to save player progress on each level. According to All-Stars developers, the compilation was created because Miyamoto felt The Lost Levels had not reached a wide audience and wanted more players to experience it. All-Stars was rereleased as a Limited Edition for the Nintendo Wii console in commemoration of Super Mario Bros.'s 25th anniversary in 2010. The Lost Levels was edited to fit the handheld Game Boy Color screen as an unlockable bonus in Super Mario Bros. Deluxe (1999): the visible screen is cropped and some features are omitted, such as the wind and five bonus worlds. The Lost Levels was rereleased in 2004 for the Game Boy Advance as part of the Japanese Famicom Mini series.

Nintendo's Virtual Console digital platform introduced North America and Europe to the unedited 1986 Japanese release. The Lost Levels was released for multiple Nintendo platforms: the Wii's Virtual Console in 2007 (partially in support of Nintendo's Hanabi Festival), the 3DS's in 2012, the Wii U's in 2013, and the Switch's Nintendo Classics service in 2019. Nintendo's 2014 classic game compilations NES Remix 2 (Wii U) and Ultimate NES Remix (3DS) included selections from The Lost Levels. For the series' 35th anniversary, in late 2020, Nintendo included The Lost Levels in a limited edition Game & Watch device.

== Reception and legacy ==
Reception

Review scores
Publication	Score
Eurogamer	Wii: 8/10
GameSpot	Wii: 6.5/10
IGN	3DS: 8.5/10
Nintendo Life	Wii U: 8/10
Famicom Hisshoubon	FDS: 3/5, 2/5, 2/5 (Note: Each of the three reviewers in Famicom Hisshoubon ranked the game on a 5 point scale.)

The Lost Levels topped Famicom Tsūshin's charts. It was the most popular game on the Disk System, for which it sold about 2.5 million copies. The Japanese magazine Famicom Hisshoubon had one reviewer compliment that Mario and Luigi had different gameplay characteristics, with another wishing they had added more characters instead of just making the game more difficult. A third reviewer felt the game was lacking the freshness that the previous Super Mario games had had. Two reviewers felt it was released as ploy to get people to purchase a Famicom Disk System.

Retrospective critics viewed The Lost Levels as an expansion of the original, akin to extra challenge levels tacked on its end. Despite their similarities, the sequel is distinguished by its notorious difficulty. 1001 Video Games You Must Play Before You Die summarized it as both "familiar and mysterious" and "simply rather unfair". The Lost Levels replaced the original's accessible level designs with "insanely tough obstacle courses" as if designed to intentionally frustrate and punish players beginning with its first poison mushroom.

Retrospective reviewers recommended The Lost Levels for those who mastered the original, or those who would appreciate a painful challenge. Casual Mario fans, GameZone wrote, would not find much to enjoy. Nintendo Life's reviewer felt that while Super Mario Bros. was designed for recklessness, The Lost Levels taught patience, and despite its difficulty remained fun and "fiendishly clever". On the other hand, GamesRadar felt it was an unoriginal, boring retread, and apart from its "pointlessly cruel" difficulty, not worthy of the player's time. GamesRadar and IGN agreed with Nintendo of America's choice against releasing the harder game in the 1980s, though Eurogamer thought that The Lost Levels was "technically a much better game" than the Doki Doki Panic-based Super Mario Bros. 2 the American market received instead.

The Lost Levels is remembered as among the most difficult video games. In 2015, Kotaku wrote that the precision required in The Lost Levels made fast playthroughs (speedruns) "remarkably fun" to spectate. NES Remix 2 (2014), a compilation for the Wii U, similarly segmented The Lost Levels into speedrun challenges, which made the challenging gameplay more palatable. Many years after the release of The Lost Levels, fans of the series would modify Mario games to challenge each other with nearly impossible levels. The challenges of The Lost Levels presaged this Kaizo community, and according to IGN, The Lost Levels shares more in common with this subculture than with the Mario series itself. Indeed, the sequel is remembered as a black sheep in the franchise and a reminder of imbalanced gameplay in Nintendo's history.

Luigi received his first distinctive character traits in The Lost Levels: less ground friction, and the ability to jump farther. IGN considered this the most significant change, though the controls remained "cramped" and "crippled" with either character. The poison mushroom item, with its character-impairing effects, became a staple of the Mario franchise. (Note: Games that featured the mushroom include Super Mario Kart (1992), Paper Mario: The Thousand-Year Door (2004), Mario & Luigi: Partners in Time (2005), Mario Kart Arcade GP 2 (2007), Super Mario 3D Land (2011), and Mario Party: Star Rush (2016). It also appears in Mario-themed games outside the franchise, such as Puzzle & Dragons Super Mario Bros. Edition and the Wii U version of Tekken Tag Tournament 2.) Some of the Lost Levels appeared in a 1986 promotional release of Super Mario Bros., in which Nintendo modified in-game assets to fit themes from the Japanese radio show All Night Nippon. Journalists have ranked The Lost Levels among the least important in the Mario series and of Nintendo's top games.
