= Austro =

Austro may refer to:

- Austro-, a prefix denoting Austria
- Austro (automobile), an Austrian cyclecar manufactured 1913–1914
- Austro Engine, an aircraft engine manufacturer
- Ēostre or *Austrō, a Proto-Germanic goddess widely associated with spring and dawn
- As part of scientific neologisms, 'austro-' means “South”

== See also ==
- Australo- (disambiguation)
