= Italian destroyer Ostro =

Ostro was the name of at least two ships of the Italian Navy and may refer to:

- Italian destroyer Ostro (1901), a Lampo-class destroyer launched in 1901 and discarded in 1920.
- Italian destroyer Ostro (1928), a Turbine-class destroyer launched in 1928 and sunk in 1940.
