= Super Mario 3D All-Stars =

2020 video game compilation

- Developer: Nintendo EPD (Note: Additional work by 1-Up Studio. Nintendo European Research & Development developed the emulators used in the games.)
- Publisher: Nintendo
- Producer: Kenta Motokura
- Composers: Mahito Yokota; Koji Kondo
- Series: Super Mario
- Platform: Nintendo Switch
- Release: September 18, 2020
- Genres: Platform, action-adventure
- Modes: Single-player, multiplayer

Super Mario 3D All-Stars (Note: Known in East Asia as Super Mario 3D Collection (スーパーマリオ３Ｄコレクション)) is a 2020 platform game compilation developed and published by Nintendo for the Nintendo Switch. It commemorates the 35th anniversary of Nintendo's Super Mario series, with ports of Super Mario 64 (1996), Super Mario Sunshine (2002), and Super Mario Galaxy (2007) in high-definition.

The compilation was released on September 18, 2020, and was available until March 31, 2021, when it was discontinued and removed from the Nintendo eShop. It received positive reviews for its games, technical improvements, and controls, but was criticized for its presentation, lack of additional content, time-limited release, and the absence of Super Mario Galaxy 2 (2010). As of March 2021, Super Mario 3D All-Stars had sold more than 9 million copies worldwide, making it one of the best-selling video games of 2020, as well as the 24th-best-selling game for the Nintendo Switch.

== Content ==
Super Mario 3D All-Stars compiles high-definition ports of the first three 3D platform games in the Super Mario series: Super Mario 64 (1996), Super Mario Sunshine (2002), and Super Mario Galaxy (2007). The version of Super Mario 64 in the compilation is the Japan-only Rumble Pak rerelease from July 1997, which added rumble support as well as bug fixes and gameplay alterations.

All games in the collection utilize emulation; however, Galaxy was partially recompiled to run natively on the Nintendo Switch. They support Joy-Con controls with rumble function, and are displayed at higher resolutions, such as Sunshine running in a 16:9 aspect ratio. Both Sunshine and Galaxy are displayed in 1080p in TV Mode and 720p in Handheld Mode, while 64 is displayed in 720p in both modes in a 4:3 aspect ratio. A patch released in November 2020 added camera options for all three games and control options for F.L.U.D.D. in Sunshine.

Sunshine did not initially natively support the GameCube controller on the Nintendo Switch. When originally released on the GameCube, Sunshine used the GameCube controller's analog triggers (which Switch controllers do not have) to regulate F.L.U.D.D.'s water pressure. For the collection, F.L.U.D.D. is controlled with the right bumper for precision aiming while standing still, while using the right trigger "is akin to pulling the GameCube's analog trigger to about the three-quarters mark". GameCube controller support for Sunshine was added in November 2020 for use in TV Mode. A further patch released in November 2021 enabled Super Mario 64 to be played with the Nintendo 64 wireless controller available to Nintendo Switch Online subscribers.

Galaxy features optional Joy-Con controls that imitate the motion-controlled setup of the Wii Remote and Nunchuk, with Mario's spin ability remapped to the X and Y buttons. When using the Pro Controller, the gyroscope is utilized for the pointer, and it can be recentered with the right bumper. When playing in Handheld Mode or on the Nintendo Switch Lite system, players must use the touchscreen in lieu of the pointer. To play Galaxy's cooperative mode in Handheld Mode or on the Nintendo Switch Lite, a secondary Joy-Con is needed.

The compilation also features a music player mode, which compiles the entire original soundtracks of all three games, totaling 175 tracks. The music can be played when the screen is turned off. Additionally, a random song from any of the three soundtracks will play whenever the player opens the collection's main menu.

== Development ==
Super Mario 3D All-Stars was developed by Nintendo EPD and published by Nintendo, and was internally known as "Super Mario All-Stars 2", according to Eurogamer. During development, the team intended to maintain elements of the original games, such as design and spirit, while offering improvements such as an increased resolution and changes to the controller layout. They interviewed team members of the original games to better understand the games' significance. The constituent games of 3D All-Stars utilize software emulation, and the emulation used for Super Mario Sunshine was developed by Nintendo European Research & Development, who also worked with the rest of the 3D All-Stars team to develop several other features for Sunshine, including 16:9 rendering, controller bindings, and upgrading the fidelity of cutscenes using deep learning.

On March 30, 2020, a report from Video Games Chronicle (VGC) detailed that Nintendo would re-release several Super Mario games for the Nintendo Switch in commemoration of the series' 35th anniversary, and VentureBeat claimed that the compilation would include Super Mario 64, Super Mario Sunshine, Super Mario Galaxy, and Super Mario Galaxy 2 (2010). The next day, reports from Gematsu and Eurogamer excluded Galaxy 2, and VentureBeat later said that they could not verify the inclusion of the game. A follow-up report by VGC corroborated the inclusion of 64, Sunshine, and Galaxy, and claimed that Nintendo's plans to announce the compilation at E3 2020 were canceled due to the COVID-19 pandemic.

== Release ==
Super Mario 3D All-Stars was released in commemoration of the Super Mario series' 35th anniversary (logo pictured).

Super Mario 3D All-Stars was announced on September 3, 2020, during a Nintendo Direct presentation dedicated to the 35th anniversary of the Super Mario series. The announcement trailer also revealed the game's release date to be September 18. On the same day, it was announced that a limited collectible pin set would be made available to those who pre-ordered the game. An overview trailer released on September 14 showcased more gameplay footage from 3D All-Stars ahead of its release.

On November 17, a post-launch software update added support for the GameCube controller in Super Mario Sunshine, as well as the ability to invert the camera controls in all three games. On March 31, 2021, physical copies of 3D All-Stars were discontinued, and the game was delisted from the Nintendo eShop. Doug Bowser, president of Nintendo of America, said that the limited release of 3D All-Stars was intended to celebrate the anniversary in a "unique" way, and that Nintendo did not intend on widespread implementation of the release model. Despite its discontinuation, the game continued to be sold at retail stores. In November 2021, an update was released for 3D All-Stars that allowed Super Mario 64 to be played using the Nintendo 64 controller available to Nintendo Switch Online subscribers.

== Reception ==
=== Critical response ===
Reception

Aggregate scores
Aggregator	Score
Metacritic	82/100 (Note: Based on 102 reviews)
OpenCritic	85% recommend

Review scores
Publication	Score
4Players	87/100
Destructoid	8.5/10
GameRevolution	3.5/5
GameSpot	8/10
GamesRadar+	4/5
Hardcore Gamer	4.5/5
Jeuxvideo.com	15/20
Nintendo Life	9/10
Nintendo World Report	8.5/10
Pocket Gamer	4.5/5
Shacknews	7/10
USgamer	4/5
VentureBeat	4/5
VG247	4/5

According to the review aggregating website Metacritic, Super Mario 3D All-Stars received "generally favorable reviews". Fellow review aggregator OpenCritic assessed that the compilation received strong approval, being recommended by 85% of critics. Critics generally agreed that the games themselves remained enjoyable, but were divided over the presentation, which received criticism for its simplistic nature and lack of additional features, its limited time release, and the absence of Super Mario Galaxy 2 (2010).

Ian Walker from Kotaku said the port of 64 "hasn't introduced any obviously unfortunate consequences" and even fixed some "occasional performance dips" from the original, and that the controls for the game worked well on the Switch. For Sunshine, he felt the adjusted controls would affect anyone playing who had muscle memory from the original and that the visuals stuttered somewhat late in the game. For Galaxy, Walker was thankful that some of the motion-based controls were remapped to controller buttons but added some of the areas that still required the motion controls were still problematic as they were on the Wii.

IGN's Zachary Ryan was "a little bit disappointed in the lack of effort Nintendo has put into" the collection, when compared to the "major overhauls" done for the games in Super Mario All-Stars, and noted the use of emulation to present the three games helped explain "a lot about the lack of upgrades" in each. For 64, Ryan felt the upscaling made the game look the nicest it ever had, and called the controls "still super tight" and "right at home on a Pro Controller or Joy-Con", despite the x-axis camera controls being inverted (a later patch would make this optional). He did wish Nintendo had added "some quality-of-life upgrades", feeling players experiencing the game for the first time "might find it somewhat inaccessible". For Sunshine, Ryan said that it was still a fantastic looking game and commended the controls still remaining fluid, though Ryan experienced some slowdown in certain moments. Finally, Ryan felt upscaling Galaxy made it "a fully realized version" of the game and praised the updated control options, adding the handheld mode configuration, while "not the most ideal way to play", still worked.

=== Sales ===
By September 7, pre-orders for Super Mario 3D All-Stars had made it the second-best-selling game of 2020 on Amazon in the United States, behind Animal Crossing: New Horizons. Scalpers resold pre-orders on websites such as eBay, going as high as US$265. Base.com, an online retailer in the United Kingdom, was forced to cancel all of their customers' pre-orders because their allocation of physical games was not enough to fulfil pre-orders. They added that Nintendo and their UK distributors were "unable to give... any reassurance" that more copies would be made available to them through the on-sale period.

In its first week of release, Super Mario 3D All-Stars was the best-selling game in the UK, and was the third-largest game launch of 2020 and the fifth-fastest-selling Switch game in the country. In Japan, the game sold over 210,000 physical copies within the first three days of its release. In the United States, Super Mario 3D All-Stars was the second-best-selling game of September behind Marvel's Avengers, and had become the tenth-best-selling game of 2020. The collection was also the best-selling game in September for Europe, the Middle East, Africa, and Asia. As of March 2021, Super Mario 3D All-Stars has sold over 9.01 million units worldwide. In March 2021, ahead of its delisting, the game's physical sales in the United Kingdom spiked around 267%. Up until December 31, 2021, its shipment increased to 9.07 million copies.

== Related ==
Super Mario 64 was subsequently included in the Nintendo 64 - Nintendo Classics catalogue for the Nintendo Switch Online service's Expansion Pack add-on upon its introduction in October 25, 2021, while Super Mario Sunshine was re-released as part of the Nintendo GameCube - Nintendo Classics catalogue exclusive to the Nintendo Switch 2 on August 13, 2026. Super Mario Galaxy + Super Mario Galaxy 2, a compilation of the respective entries, was announced by Nintendo during the September 2025 installment of Nintendo Direct and released for Nintendo Switch on October 2, 2025 in commemoration of the Super Mario Bros. 40th Anniversary celebration. Each game features improvements to their respective UI and resolution over either their original releases or Galaxy's appearance in 3D All Stars, along with new content for Rosalina's storybook expanded upon in Galaxy and newly added to Galaxy 2. An easy mode (called "Assist Mode" in these games) increases the life meter up to 6, significantly lowering the difficulty levels. A patch for the games on the Nintendo Switch 2 allows for 4K resolution and support for the Joy-Con 2's mouse functions.

== See also ==
- List of Nintendo Switch games
- 2020 in video games
