= Mario Tennis Open =

2012 video game

- Packaging artwork
- Developer: Camelot Software Planning
- Publisher: Nintendo
- Director: Shugo Takahashi
- Producers: Hiroyuki Takahashi; Shugo Takahashi
- Designers: Hiroyuki Takahashi; Shugo Takahashi
- Artist: Fumihide Aoki
- Composer: Motoi Sakuraba
- Series: Mario Tennis
- Platform: Nintendo 3DS
- Release: NA: May 20, 2012; JP/AU: May 24, 2012; EU: May 25, 2012
- Genre: Sports
- Modes: Single-player, multiplayer

Mario Tennis Open (Note: Japanese: マリオテニス オープン, Hepburn: Mario Tenisu Ōpun) is a 2012 sports video game developed by Camelot Software Planning and published by Nintendo for the Nintendo 3DS. Like earlier Mario Tennis titles, it features characters, settings, and scenarios from the Mario franchise participating in tennis matches of varying rulesets and objectives. Unlike prior handheld titles, the game doesn't feature any RPG elements or story mode and is the first title in the series to feature simultaneous region locked online play.

The game received mixed reviews from critics, with praise towards its gameplay, audiovisual presentation, and additional modes, but criticism towards its similarities to prior titles, online mode lag and lack of features, lack of story mode, and focus on Mii characters compared to Mario characters.

== Gameplay ==
Mario and Yoshi playing against Luigi and Daisy in a doubles match. The player can choose to execute different shots using button presses or by selecting them from the Nintendo 3DS touchscreen, as shown.

Mario Tennis Open is a sports video game featuring Mario series characters participating in tennis matches. The game features variants of tennis matches, played either in singles or doubles. Different shots (lobs, slices, and dropshots) can be executed with different button combinations or by selecting them from the Nintendo 3DS touch screen. In addition, the player can use the 3DS gyroscope to turn the in-game camera by rotating the entire console during gameplay. Mario Tennis Open does not feature any RPG elements, unlike the previous handheld games Mario Tennis and Mario Tennis: Power Tour.

Mario Tennis Open features twenty-four playable Mario characters, with four being unlocked by accomplishing specific tasks, and eight more being unlocked by scanning certain QR codes. Each character possesses a pre-determined skill, such as advantages in speed, offense, or defense. Mii characters saved in the Nintendo 3DS Mii Maker are also selectable. Unlike the Mario characters, Mii characters' skills vary and are customizable, determined by the tennis gear the player equips. The gear options are purchased using coins that are awarded after playing each game mode. However, costumes are obtained by completing certain objectives.

Mario Tennis Open supports both region locked online and local wireless multiplayer, allowing up to four players to play simultaneously on separate Nintendo 3DS consoles. When a player's Nintendo 3DS console comes in contact with another via StreetPass, they will be able to play against a computer-controlled opponent whose play style mimics that of the other player, provided that the other console also contains Mario Tennis Open save data.

== Reception ==
Reception

Aggregate scores
Aggregator	Score
GameRankings	69.26%
Metacritic	69/100

Review scores
Publication	Score
Electronic Gaming Monthly	7/10
Eurogamer	7/10
Famitsu	34/40
Game Informer	8/10
GameSpot	5.5/10
GamesRadar+	6/10
GameTrailers	8.1/10
IGN	6.5/10
Nintendo Life	7/10
Nintendo Power	7/10
Nintendo World Report	7.5/10
Official Nintendo Magazine	80%

Mario Tennis Open has received mixed reviews, with aggregate scores of 69.26 percent on GameRankings and 69 on Metacritic.

Critics praised its gameplay, audiovisual presentation, and additional modes, but criticized its similarities to prior titles, online mode lag and lack of features, lack of story mode, and focus on Mii characters compared to Mario characters.

Nintendo World Report considered the online of the game "disappointing" and criticized its constant lag issues and how it was very limited due to a lack of features: only featuring quick or extended exhibition matches, being region locked, and lacking community-style features and online tournaments.

Nintendo Power scored Mario Tennis Open 7.0 out of 10 in its May 2012 issue. Game Informer gave the game an 8 out of 10 while Nintendo World Report gave it a 7.5 out of 10.

As of August 12, 2012, the game has sold 280,000 copies in Japan. As of March 31, 2013, the game has worldwide sales of 1.11 million.
