= Rosalina (Mario) =

Video game character

- Mario character
- Promotional art by Shigehisa Nakaue (2017)
- First game: Super Mario Galaxy (2007)
- Created by: Yoshiaki Koizumi
- Voiced by: English: Mercedes Rose; Kerri Kane; Laura Faye Smith; Brie Larson (The Super Mario Galaxy Movie); Japanese: Maaya Sakamoto (The Super Mario Galaxy Movie)

In-universe information
- Home: Comet Observatory

Rosalina, known as Rosetta (Japanese: ロゼッタ, Hepburn: Rozetta) in Japan, is a character in Nintendo's Mario franchise. She was created by Yoshiaki Koizumi and debuted in Super Mario Galaxy (2007) as a non-player character who resides in the Comet Observatory, the game's hub world. In the game, Rosalina is the adoptive mother of the Lumas, a species of star-like creatures, and also watcher of the cosmos.

Rosalina has since appeared as a playable character in subsequent games, such as the Mario Kart, Mario Party, and Super Smash Bros. series, as well as Super Mario 3D World and Super Mario Bros. Wonder – Nintendo Switch 2 Edition: Meetup in Bellabel Park. She also appears in Mario + Rabbids Sparks of Hope (2022), where she is possessed by Cursa, the main antagonist. She appears in the 2026 film The Super Mario Galaxy Movie, where she is voiced by Brie Larson.

== Development ==
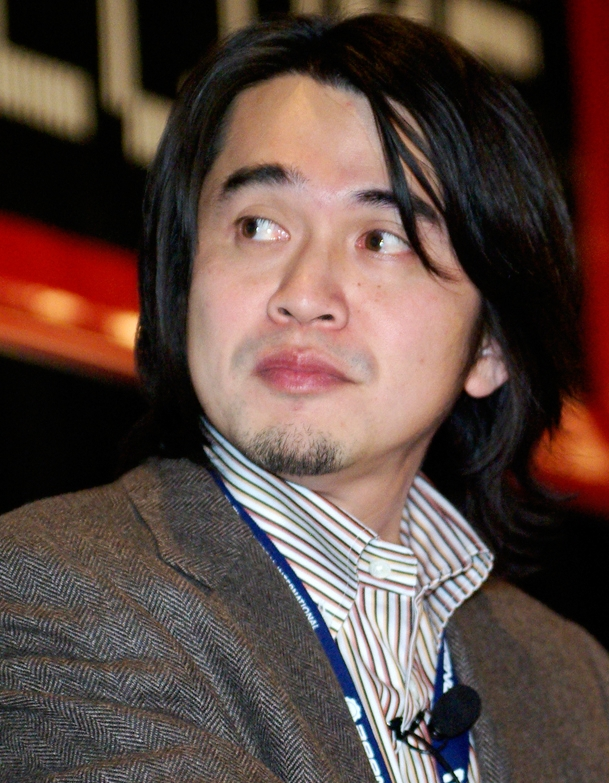
Concept art (left) compared to the final design (center), and creator Yoshiaki Koizumi (right, pictured in 2007)

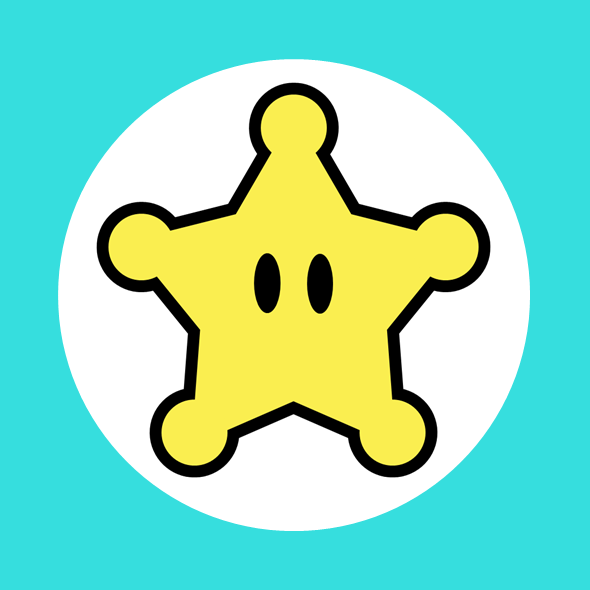
Rosalina's Grand Star emblem is used to represent her in many games.

In Super Mario Galaxy the player unlocks a storybook as the game progresses known in-game as Rosalina's Storybook, which tells Rosalina's backstory where she is shown to have grown up with two parents and a younger brother. It was written by Yoshiaki Koizumi late at night so that no one would find out about it, saying that "for a long time, it really felt like telling a story in a Mario game was something that wasn't allowed" in an interview. In another interview, Koizumi stated "I felt in this case that the Lumas and Rosalina really needed a story to explain what they were doing out there and to give the players a deeper understanding of their presence. So telling her story as a fairytale by reading the book to all the Lumas as if they were young children at storytime just seemed like the mood-appropriate way to accomplish this."

When Rosalina's character was in early development, the Super Mario Galaxy development team contemplated having her character be related to Princess Peach. This relationship did not remain as an element of the final story, but is the reason for the design similarities between Peach and Rosalina.

== Appearances ==
=== Super Mario series ===
In Super Mario Galaxy, Bowser steals Princess Peach's castle by raising it from the ground with Mario and Luigi still inside, and later, he also attacks the Comet Observatory, where Rosalina lives with her adopted Lumas, and steals its main source of fuel: Power Stars. Rosalina asks Mario to retrieve the lost Power Stars; in return she promises to help him save Princess Peach. Once Mario retrieves enough Power Stars, Rosalina is able to turn her Comet Observatory into a comet and drive Mario to the center of the universe, where Bowser keeps the kidnapped Princess Peach. After Bowser is defeated by Mario, Bowser's galaxy at the center of the universe collapses into a supermassive black hole, devouring everything in its path, including Princess Peach's castle, Rosalina's Comet Observatory and Bowser's airships. All of Rosalina's Lumas throw themselves into the black hole in order to stop it. After this, Rosalina appears to Mario, explaining to him about the circle of life and the death and rebirth of stars; it is implicit in her explanation that the universe and all the Lumas are to be reborn. Afterwards, she leaves and Mario, as well as Bowser and Peach, wake up back in the Mushroom Kingdom again. Once 120 Power Stars in the game are collected, Rosalina delivers a thank you message to the player, promising to watch over them from beyond the stars. In a backstory which is unlocked gradually as the game progresses, Rosalina tells the story of how she was a girl who travelled in a spaceship to help a lost Luma find its parents, hiding the fact that she herself had lost her own mother. As Rosalina starts to feel lonely, numerous other Lumas soon come to join her, and she learns that their purpose in life is to eventually transform into other things. Rosalina decides to build a house for her new family, which soon becomes the Comet Observatory.

In Super Mario Galaxy 2, throughout the game, a shadowy form named the "Cosmic Spirit", strongly resembling Rosalina, appears to help in levels where the player has died multiple times. Rosalina is the one who mysteriously sends letters containing 50 Star Bits to Baby Luma who grants Mario a spin attack and she herself appears after Mario defeats Bowser and rescues Princess Peach in the final cutscene before the credits play. Rosalina also appears late in the game as well (by collecting 120 Power Stars), telling Lumas the story of the "Green Stars", which opens the Green Star missions (additional optional missions in the game), and finally, with the game completed, she appears on the game's hub and thanks Mario.

In Super Mario 3D World, Rosalina is featured as an unlockable fifth character. She possesses the ability to perform the Spin Attack that Mario could in the Galaxy games, using it as both an attack and a second jump. When asked why Nintendo chose Rosalina over other Mario characters, director Kenta Motokura responded, "I was thinking about what would be pleasing after the ending and wanted to bring in another female character in addition to Princess Peach. Rosalina has a following among the Super Mario Galaxy fanbase, and she's appeared in Mario Kart recently, so I think she is well known."

In Super Mario Odyssey, she appears as an 8-bit sprite in the Dark and Darker Side of the Moon which can be hit by Cappy to collect ten coins. In Super Mario Bros. Wonder – Nintendo Switch 2 Edition: Meetup in Bellabel Park, she appears as a playable character.

=== Other games ===
Rosalina has appeared in the Mario Kart series as an unlockable character starting with Mario Kart Wii, though she is available by default in Mario Kart 8 Deluxe. Mario Kart 8 sees the introduction of a baby version of Rosalina. Rosalina also has a namesake racing track in Mario Kart 7 called Rosalina's Ice World. Joystiq commented on her appearance, saying that it was nice to see another "Nintendo character join the obscenely large roster of folks showing their faces in the game."

Rosalina appears as a playable character in Mario Golf: World Tour, available via downloadable content. Rosalina is a playable fighter in Super Smash Bros. for Nintendo 3DS and Wii U and Super Smash Bros. Ultimate, where she fights alongside various colored Lumas, as well as being in Mario Party 10, Mario Tennis: Ultra Smash, Super Mario Party, Mario Tennis Aces, Mario Tennis Fever, Mario Golf: Super Rush, Mario Strikers Battle League, and Mario Party Superstars. She also joined the roster in Mario & Sonic at the Rio 2016 Olympic Games, and later reappeared in Mario & Sonic at the Olympic Games Tokyo 2020. Rosalina appears in Super Mario Maker as a Mystery Mushroom costume, which can be unlocked either through the 100-Mario challenge, or by scanning her amiibo figure. Rosalina also appeared in a crossover in Puzzle & Dragons Z. She appears in Mario + Rabbids Sparks of Hope, where she is possessed by Cursa, the game's main antagonist. The game also features Rabbid Rosalina, a Rabbid who admires and dresses like her, as one of the protagonists.

=== Other media ===
Rosalina appears in The Super Mario Galaxy Movie (2026), voiced by Brie Larson. In the opening scene, Rosalina is captured by Bowser Jr. while reading a bedtime story to the Lumas. The film focuses on Mario, Luigi, Princess Peach, Toad, Yoshi, and Fox McCloud trying to find her. Rosalina and Peach are revealed as sisters in the film, both having been created from stardust and have the ability to create life. As children, Rosalina sent Peach to the Mushroom Kingdom to protect her from imminent danger, and the two became separated until the end of the film.

== Reception ==
Pedro Hernandez, writing for Nintendo World Report, chose Rosalina as his favourite Nintendo character, describing her as "one of the most fascinating and enigmatic Mario characters the franchise has yet seen" and commented that while other Nintendo characters rarely stray from their archetype, Rosalina is a "multifaceted and complicated character". Siliconera called Rosalina's story "bittersweet" and opined that while it could have been just another "save the princess" story, it instead "takes Super Mario Galaxy to an artistic level other Mario titles haven't approached." Destructoid positively reviewed Rosalina's design, describing her as a "celestial stunner" and said that she "embodies style perfection". Jake Shapiro of Nintendo Life complained about Rosalina being a princess from the Mario franchise, stating "It's a bummer that every single female-identified character in Mario Kart 8 is a princess".

Mike Sholars writing for Kotaku opined that Rosalina's introduction brought with it a fundamental change in the Mario franchise. He said that while Princess Peach spent almost every game being rescued by Mario, Rosalina was not given the usual role of damsel in distress, but instead had her own lore. He further opined that "Nintendo seems to be chafing against its self-imposed reliance on distressed damsels". In 2018, unused concept art of Rosalina playing a guitar in a Super Mario Odyssey art book developed into an internet obsession and spawned numerous works of fan art, which Ryan Craddock of Nintendo Life likened to Bowsette.
