= We Love Golf! =

2007 video game

- North American game cover
- Developer: Camelot Software Planning
- Publisher: Capcom
- Directors: Shugo Takahashi; Yusuke Sugimoto
- Producers: Hiroyuki Takahashi; Shugo Takahashi; Hironobu Takeshita; Dennis Hrehoriac; Keiji Inafune
- Designer: Hiroyuki Takahashi
- Programmer: Yasuhiro Taguchi
- Artist: Fumihide Aoki
- Composer: Motoi Sakuraba
- Platform: Wii
- Release: JP: December 13, 2007; EU: July 4, 2008; NA: July 15, 2008; AU: August 7, 2008
- Genre: Sports
- Modes: Single-player, multiplayer

We Love Golf! (Note: Japanese: ウイーラブゴルフ!, Hepburn: Uī Rabu Gorufu!) is a 2007 sports video game developed by Camelot Software Planning and published by Capcom for the Wii. It is the first Camelot game since Mario Golf (1999) on the Nintendo 64 to be published by a studio other than Nintendo, as well as their first and only game published by Capcom. We Love Golf! was initially released in Japan on December 13, 2007, before being released worldwide in 2008, which included additional characters and online connectivity via Nintendo Wi-Fi Connection.

The gameplay is similar to that of the Mario Golf series, with players adjusting their shots with the Power Gauge and performing different types of swings with button combinations. Additionally, We Love Golf! introduces motion controls with the Wii Remote, allowing players to time the Wii Remote swings for more accurate shots. It contains a roster of original characters, with unlockable outfits from Capcom franchises and support for Mii integration.

Development of an online PC golf game named I Love Golf! (Note: Japanese: ゴルフだいすき！, Hepburn: Gorufu Daisuki!) began prior to the conception of We Love Golf!. The project was created alongside online gaming company Eleven-Up and Yahoo Japan Corporation to be part of a larger online service called the G Planet Concept. The service would have provided a free-to-access area for players to interact and play exclusive paid games, with I Love Golf! being the only planned game that could have been accessed through the website. After hosting playable demos and promotion for the title, it was later canceled due to market conditions, but proved helpful for creating the online connectivity included in the international release of We Love Golf!. Camelot then partnered with Capcom to publish a casual sports game for Wii, and the development team focused on creating realistic and natural Wii Remote controls. The visuals were also created to strike a balance between realism and fantasy.

We Love Golf! received generally positive reviews. It was praised for its variety of game modes, Capcom-themed costumes, golf courses, and the online functionality added to the international releases. The controls received a mixed reception from critics, and criticism was expressed over its easy difficulty. Several publications have compared its visuals and art style to Mario Golf: Toadstool Tour (2003). According to Capcom, the game sold slowly in Japan, selling around 55,000 copies total in the region. Camelot would later return to work with Nintendo, with their next golf video game being Mario Golf: World Tour (2014).

== Gameplay ==
The player golfing against a computer opponent in a Character Match, performing a Power Shot with the Wii Remote

We Love Golf! is a sports video game played by swinging the Wii Remote like a golf club. When holding down the Wii Remote, the player will enter "Shot Mode", where they can perform a practice shot or hit the ball. By moving the Wii Remote further back on the Power Gauge, a more powerful shot will be performed, while the downswing determines the shot's accuracy. If the player moves the Wii Remote to the peak of the Power Gauge, they can perform a power shot, launching the golf ball further with more difficult timing. The controls are adapted from the Mario Golf series, replacing the series gameplay formula of three button presses, instead using a held button press to initiate swinging motions using the Wii Remote. By turning the Wii Remote left and right, players can execute draw and fade shots. By holding down a combination of buttons before their swing, players can perform a variety of different shot types, the effects of which will be displayed on the shot guideline. When pointing the Wii Remote upwards, the player can view the course and adjust their aim, and when putting, they can view the terrain on the green. A talking Wii Remote with limbs named Chip provides tips to players during gameplay, with another character named Birdie speaking to the player through the Wii Remote's speakers. Additionally, selecting Chip will provide a list of lessons during a golf match, with Chip evaluating the player's performance on each lesson.

There are multiple game modes available in We Love Golf!. The Tournaments mode has eight cups, each being unlocked after the previous cup is completed, with the additional option to choose between Pro and Mirrored Tournament modes. Strokes mode has the player compete for the best score in the lowest number of strokes, with customizable settings for the amount of holes and the starting position. Training allows the player to practice on any hole from courses in the game, with the ability to retry shots infinitely from their position on the course. Character Match has the player compete against a character to unlock them for use in the game, Ring Shot scatters rings across the course for the player to pass through while making it to the end with the fewest strokes, Target Golf has players aim at targets with different clubs, and Near Pin Contest requires players to hit the ball as close to the target as possible. Single-player and multiplayer options are available for the game, and in multiplayer, opponents can cheer for or heckle others. Multiplayer modes include Match Play, a two-player mode awarding the winner to whomever can win ten holes, and Skins Match, a mode where up to four players compete for the best score.

There are twelve original playable characters to choose from in the western version. All characters have unique stats affecting their Impact Zone, Control, and Spin when golfing, as well as distinct personality traits shown during their animations. The game also allows players to use Mii avatars as playable characters, which are unlocked after obtaining all other characters in the single-player mode. In addition, a number of costumes can be unlocked based on other Capcom franchises, including Ace Attorney, Darkstalkers, Ghosts 'n Goblins, Resident Evil, Street Fighter, and Zack & Wiki: Quest for Barbaros' Treasure. The Tournament mode references multiple other Capcom characters as opponent names. There are eight golf courses included, such as a beach resort and a desert ruin, as well as courses based around pirate and candy themes. It also contains two smaller courses and an exclusive course for mini golf.

The international releases also feature online play via Nintendo Wi-Fi Connection. Players can battle online with opponents around the world to receive player medals or battle with friends privately. Online play is limited to nine-hole matches with two difficulty modes, beginner and master, with the higher difficulty option adjusting the starting tee position. When competing against random opponents online, players are matched based on their skill levels.

== Development ==
=== I Love Golf! ===
We Love Golf! was developed by Camelot Software Planning, which had previously developed Everybody's Golf (1997) and games in the Mario Golf series, making it their seventh golf game overall. Before it began conception, a different online golf game was planned for the PC market exclusively in Japan, but was later canceled. The project was named "I Love Golf!", and was created in collaboration with Eleven-Up, a Japanese online game management company founded on February 16, 2006. I Love Golf! was the first video game Camelot had developed for PC, and it was revealed on August 1, 2006 at the Hotel Okura Tokyo. Despite never previously developing games for PC, Camelot had some experience implementing online mechanics with the Game Boy Color game Mobile Golf (2001), utilizing the Mobile Adapter GB and cellular network connectivity. It was the first video game created to promote a new online service called the "G Planet Concept", which aimed to create a convenient environment through the Internet for people to play PC games in Japan. Online, players would have accessed a lobby known as the "Open Space", controlling their character in an open free-to-play environment. They would be able to communicate with other online users, play minigames, or play dedicated games hosted on the server, such as I Love Golf!. As described by 4Gamer.net, controlling the characters online was similar to the controls of an MMORPG, with web browsing functionality and in-game advertisements hosted by Yahoo. An online website that allowed players to test the game was hosted by BB Games under the operation of Movida Entertainment. Although unreleased, previews of I Love Golf! were available for people to play at private events, while the Open Space was not available to be accessed.

I Love Golf! allowed the player to divide different camera angles into multiple computer windows.

The gameplay and controls for I Love Golf! differed from what would eventually become the Wii game, with the ability to open up to five computer windows to display different camera angles, controlling it with either a solo computer mouse or keyboard. Controls for hitting the golf ball were similar to the Mario Golf series, and players would be able to chat with others online. Players entered courses in the golf clubhouse lobby, where they could create online matches or enter existing matches. It was also tested to work with mobile laptops that had weak graphical processing power. Upon its initial reveal, Eleven-Up CEO Takashi Katayama and singer and actress Aya Ueto demonstrated the gameplay, with Ueto serving as an advertiser for the game. Shugo Takahashi, Vice President of Camelot, claimed I Love Golf! would make people who do not regularly play golf fall in love with the sport. Players were able to submit an application to test an early version of I Love Golf! at a private event from August 22 to August 25, 2006, with an open beta test and full game release scheduled later within the year. A demo was scheduled to be playable at the Tokyo Game Show 2006, but the exhibit was canceled on September 15, 2006. Previews for the game contained one 18-hole golf course and two playable characters, with the Open Space being inaccessible during testing. It was planned to release as a paid game with the affordability of a mobile application, while multiple minigames would also be offered for free. A prototype mouse with rumble functionality manufactured by HORI was distributed to members during a press event, with the mouse vibrating based on the movements of the golf ball.

Promotion for the game was handled by Yahoo Japan Corporation, with online distribution and payments handled by Yahoo Games. Promotional material was also set to feature Aya Ueto in advertising, with singer Toshinobu Kubota set to perform an original song in commercials. Ueto also appeared as a character in-game at the receptionist desk in the lobby. Kubota said that he was amazed by the demo when seeing it for the first time, and was excited to support the project by providing music. Additionally, scientist Hiroaki Kitano and SoftBank CEO Masayoshi Son participated by testing the game. The announcement of future G Planet Concept series games was considered by Katayama, with Shugo Takahashi suggesting a tennis title could potentially be made in the future. After I Love Golf! went through closed beta testing, it was deemed a risky release due to the small PC market in Japan. Additionally, Camelot reported that employees at Eleven-Up had some issues putting together the online code, so I Love Golf! was put on an indefinite hold. Eleven-Up would later cease operations on September 1, 2007. Despite the similar naming, the two games were unrelated, although the testing of I Love Golf! proved useful when implementing online play in We Love Golf!. Although Camelot denied I Love Golf! being the inspiration for We Love Golf!, publications such as NGamer viewed the Wii game as a "revived version" of that project.

=== We Love Golf! ===
After the cancellation of I Love Golf!, Capcom was given an opportunity to work with Camelot, whom they viewed as experienced casual sports video game developers, leading to the two companies forming a partnership. In an interview, Nique Fajors, Vice President of Marketing at Capcom, stated that Camelot’s genre expertise collaborating with Capcom’s creative expertise was a "virtual hole in one". Camelot claimed that their partnership with Nintendo remained strong, but developing a traditional sports game without Mario characters would raise questions from fans, so they treated a project with Capcom as an opportunity to branch out. Hiroyuki Takahashi and Shugo Takahashi, brothers and founders of Camelot, served as the producers for We Love Golf!. Shugo Takahashi also took a directorial position with Yusuke Sugimoto, while Hiroyuki Takahashi served as the main game design lead. Along with the Takahashi brothers, it was produced by Hironobu Takeshita and Dennis Hrehoriac, with Keiji Inafune as the executive producer. Yasuhiro Taguchi was the director of programming, and Fumihide Aoki was the graphics director. The music was composed by Motoi Sakuraba, who had composed all of Camelot's prior golf games. It features the English vocals of Carol-Anne Day, Onalea Gilbertson, and Roger Rhodes, among others.

The title "We Love Golf!" was chosen by the Takahashi brothers because of their love for golf as a sport. According to producer Hironobu Takeshita, day-to-day development for We Love Golf! was primarily handled by Camelot, with Capcom acting in a supporting role. Employees at Capcom wanted to challenge themselves by focusing on a casual gaming experience, since a casual sports game was far less commonly created at the company. It was "developed in a very short time", but suffered from some of their main staff members leaving the company after the release of their previous title, Mario Tennis: Power Tour (2005) on Game Boy Advance. As a result, no games developed by Camelot were released in 2006, as the company was undergoing structural changes with their staff. The new staff hired to work at Camelot were trained to become developers for We Love Golf! as well as future titles. During its conception after partnering with Capcom, Camelot offered to create a Capcom golf game featuring many of their iconic characters, but were advised to make a Camelot golf game as opposed to a Capcom one. Capcom character costumes were added instead, and they were designed by a graphic designer on Camelot's development team who was a fan of Capcom's characters. When asked by Siliconera what other Capcom costumes they would have added, one of the Takahashi brothers claimed Viewtiful Joe was among their favorites, but noted the series was less recognizable than others. Using the Wii Remote as a golf club was designed to feel as realistic and natural as possible, but the graphics were made with a lack of realism intentionally, so as not to intimidate new players and appeal to a wider market. Additionally, the visuals were made to strike a balance between realism and fantasy to both highlight the traditional elements of golf while creating fun, fantastical locations. The development team designed the golf courses using the Takahashi brothers' experience playing golf weekly, along with input given from "professional golf-course designers".

Handling the controls of the Wii Remote was described to be "incredibly difficult", with the controls undergoing a rigorous testing process of trial-and-error. The producers claimed We Love Golf! played differently from other Wii golf games such as Wii Sports (2006) and Super Swing Golf (2006), which felt almost like golf, but had "a little something missing". Instead of putting the player in the shoes of Tiger Woods, their focus was on allowing the player to learn how to build their own golfing skills by using the Wii Remote. Keeping the accessibility of the game in mind for casual audiences, Chip, the Wii Remote guide character, was created to best display the control inputs. The Takahashi brothers noted that, due to their talkative nature, the character might come across as irritating to some players, but their lessons would offer incentives to keep their voice enabled. Producer Hiroyuki Takahashi believed We Love Golf! could not be on any system other than the Wii, and considered it to control better than any sports game currently on the console. Both Takahashi brothers hoped that We Love Golf! would be their best golf game to date, and considered Mario Golf: Toadstool Tour (2003) to hold that title.

== Release ==
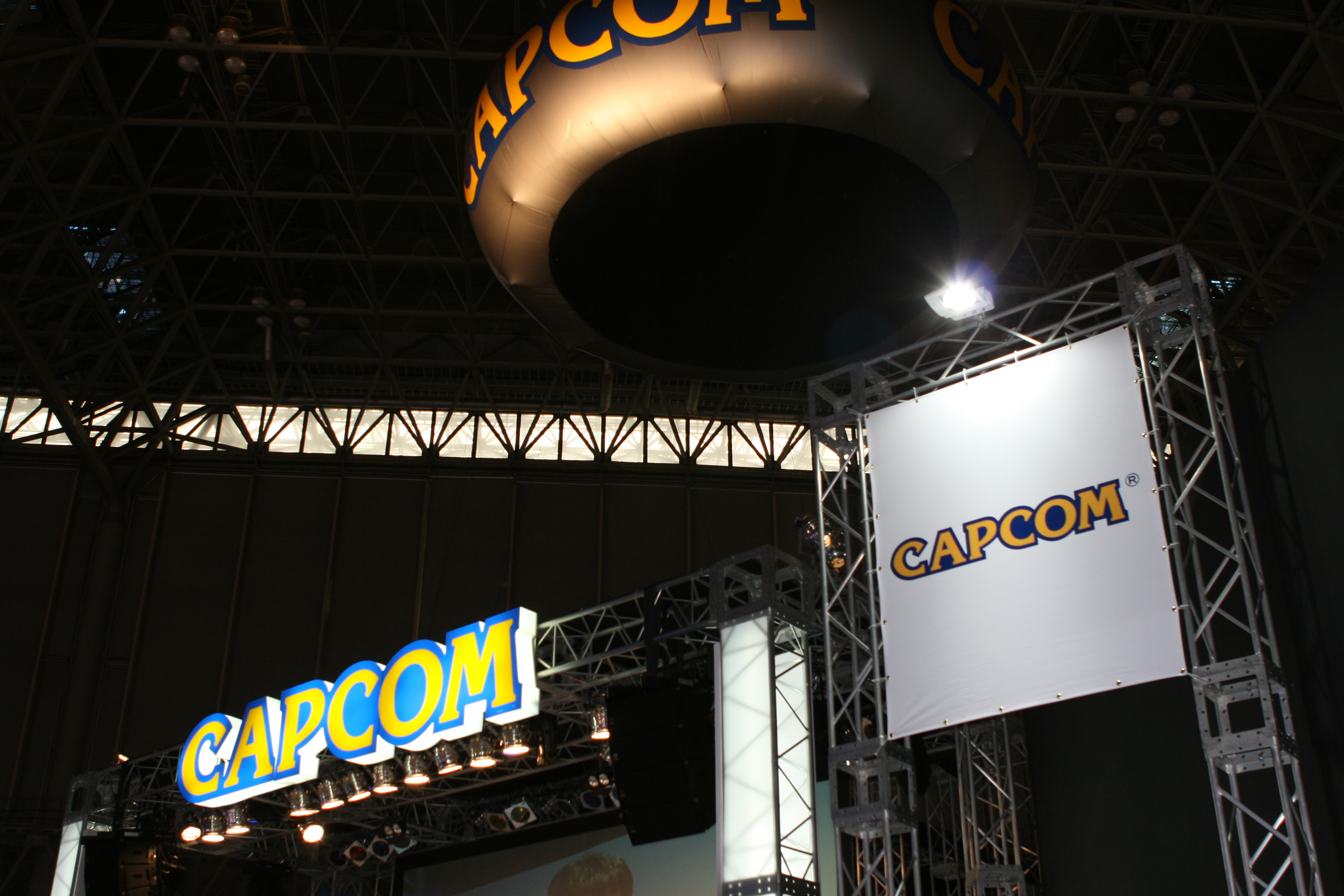
The game was playable at Capcom's booth during the Tokyo Game Show in 2007.

We Love Golf! was first revealed in an issue of Famitsu Weekly in Japan on August 29, 2007, with a planned winter release. It was detailed further at a Capcom press event on August 31, 2007. Keiji Inafune described We Love Golf! as Capcom's next "main title", with actress Waka Inoue and professional golfer Tadashi Erena demonstrating the gameplay on stage. In September 2007, It was given a booth with sixteen playable stations at the Tokyo Game Show. The game released in Japan on December 13, 2007. It was announced to receive a North American release on September 13, 2007. In March 2008, promotional contests for the game were held at Tokyo's Lotte Kasai golf driving range, with those who performed a hole in one receiving a free Wii console.

When releasing outside of Japan, a few changes were made. The swing speed for golf clubs on every character was adjusted, and support for Nintendo Wi-Fi Connection was added due to the popularity of online gaming in the west. Its inclusion of online support also makes it one of the first video games with Miis being playable in competitive online play. Prior to its release overseas, surveys were conducted asking people which legacy Capcom characters they would want included as costumes. The survey was featured on Capcom's blog site with options to vote for one of six male characters as well as five female characters. As a result, Ken from Street Fighter and Morrigan from Darkstalkers were added as costumes to the western release. Additionally, original characters named Mark and Stephanie were added for the western release. The graphics were also tweaked from the Japanese version to "appeal to international players". In Europe, Capcom featured the game at London Gamer's Day on October 19, 2007. In North America, Capcom held its Captivate 08 event with a fully playable version of the game. We Love Golf! released in Europe on July 4, 2008, North America on July 15, 2008, and in Australia on August 7, 2008. Pre-orders at GameStop or through Capcom's online store came bundled with a small red golf bag accessory that fit one Wii Remote inside it. This remains the only Camelot game since the release of Mario Golf published by a company other than Nintendo, and Camelot would later release Golden Sun: Dark Dawn (2010) with Nintendo as the publisher. Camelot would also return as a developer for the Mario Golf series with the release of Mario Golf: World Tour (2014).

Several other projects related to Camelot and Capcom's golf video game were planned, but ultimately canceled. Trademarks for potential successors to We Love Golf! titled "We Love Baseball" and "We Love Tennis" were registered by Camelot in 2008. According to NGamer, these titles were rumored to be in development. Takeshita labelled the game as "the first in what will hopefully be a new franchise"; however, this plan did not come to fruition. Capcom would later plan development of a crossover golf game named "Capcom Golf" without involvement from Camelot. Initially focused on the Mega Man series and being titled "Mega Man & Capcom Golf", it would shift focus to include characters from other Capcom franchises such as Ace Attorney, Dead Rising, and Devil May Cry. In contrast to We Love Golf! which was developed to be a Camelot golf game with some Capcom costumes included, "Capcom Golf" was conceptualized as a crossover. It was set to be developed by Capcom Vancouver, but was canceled following the studio's closure in 2018. According to the concept artist Julianna Michek, it was planned to be released on mobile platforms.

== Reception ==
Reception

Aggregate scores
Aggregator	Score
GameRankings	73% (Note: Score based on 32 reviews)
Metacritic	75/100 (Note: Score based on 28 reviews)

Review scores
Publication	Score
1Up.com	B
Eurogamer	6/10
Famitsu	9/10, 8/10, 7/10, 8/10
Game Informer	6/10
GamePro	4/5
GamesRadar+	4/5
GamesTM	8/10
GameZone	7.5/10
IGN	7.4/10
Nintendo Power	8.5/10
Official Nintendo Magazine	85%
VideoGamer.com	7/10

We Love Golf! received generally favorable reviews according to the review aggregator website Metacritic. A writer for GamesTM considered it to be "[t]he best-made golf game on the system". Justin Cheng of Nintendo Power similarly called it the most enjoyable golf game on Wii, citing the unlockable costumes, online play, and minigames as its strengths. It was awarded by readers of IGN as the "Wii Game of the Month" in July 2008.

Reception on the controls was mixed. Some critics believed the controls were very accessible, with Sam Kennedy of 1Up.com claiming they were understandable even for inexperienced video game players and golfers alike. Some critics liked the controls, but believed We Love Golf! did not sufficiently mimic the swing of a golf club. Kennedy wrote that it did not play as a realistic golf simulation game, instead focusing on mastering precision and timing with the Power Gauge, which he described as fun. Matt Casamassina of IGN wrote that, although "perfectly responsive", the controls were too mechanical to simulate the motion of golfing, but were good for fans of Everybody’s Golf and Mario Golf. Casamassina also wrote that while the motions for swinging felt strange, the controls for viewing the course and executing draw and fade shots work consistently, praising them over other golf video games. Other critics including GamesRadar+'s Michael Gapper and GameZone's Stephen Woodward lamented that the controls were not one-to-one with real golfing motions. Matthew Kato writing for Game Informer called the motion controls "counter-intuitive", which they believed some players would consider the motions strange to perform. VideoGamer.com's Wesley Yin-Poole felt it played more akin to a "rhythm action game", relying too much on timing rather than the swing motion. Woodward felt disappointed that the power of the swing was tied to the Power Gauge and not the power of the motion, but thought they worked well overall. Gapper was critical of the lack of button presses for golf swings, calling the controls both innovative and "by far the worst thing about the game".

Many critics believed it had a sufficient variety of game modes. Nadia Oxford of GamePro stated that in comparison to golf in Wii Sports, "We Love Golf is equipped with plenty of features to keep even single players busy", while Stephen Woodward of GameZone described the game as having excellent replay value. Matt Casamassina of IGN stated there was a good selection of game modes offered, although some were lacking in depth. Multiple critics agreed that the online was a great addition to the western release of We Love Golf!. Tom Bramwell of Eurogamer described the online as a primarily lag-free experience. Official Nintendo Magazine similarly said that there were no noticeable problems when playing online, and Wesley Yin-Poole writing for VideoGamer.com complimented its stability. Despite appreciating its inclusion, Bramwell and Casamassina critiqued the lack of various game modes when playing online.

Critics lauded the playable character roster for the inclusion of Capcom-themed costumes. IGN's Matt Casamassina, VideoGamer.com's Wesley Yin-Poole, and Official Nintendo Magazine praised this component, with Nadia Oxford writing for GamePro considering unlocking the costumes "We Love Golf's best feature". In regard to the characters themselves, Sam Kennedy of 1Up.com thought each one "bubble[s] with personality". In contrast, Casamassina considered the cast to be "generic and forgettable", and Official Nintendo Magazine thought the Mii heads on realistic bodies was "just plain scary". Additionally, Craig Harris of IGN and Nadia Oxford of GamePro described their disdain for Chip, the talking Wii Remote guide, and Birdie, the voice from the Wii Remote speaker. Harris described their traits as "god-awful annoying" while Oxford claimed they had "the usefulness and charm of a Windows Office mascot", with both praising the ability to disable their functions. The course selection was received positively by many publications. Sam Kennedy of 1Up.com and Nadia Oxford of GamePro called attention to the progression of the courses, beginning in more standard areas before golfing in more unique locations. Both Michael Gapper of GamesRadar+ and Wesley Yin-Poole of VideoGamer.com wrote that the courses were well designed, with Tom Bramwell of Eurogamer adding that the courses were "vibrant and friendly places to linger". Gapper also claimed the user interface was too cluttered at all times, describing it as "a barrage of irrelevance" with too many symbols, which he believed hindered the overall visuals.

Criticism was drawn towards the easy difficulty. Eurogamer's Tom Bramwell, Game Informer's Matthew Kato, IGN's Matt Casamassina, and VideoGamer.com's Wesley Yin-Poole all expressed negativity towards the lack of difficulty in single-player modes. Yin-Poole believed the computer players were "generally rubbish", making winning less satisfying as a result, and Kato emphasized that the lack of terrain on the putting green made for a lacking challenge. Bramwell believed the abundance of assists during gameplay was a detriment to the solid controls, and Casamassina stated "you will feel you've played poorly if you par a course". Two Famitsu reviewers had mixed opinions on the easier difficulty compared to other golf video games, with one claiming it matched the gentler controls well, while the other believed it would be good for family fun, but less engaging for golf enthusiasts. Finnish gaming magazine Pelit stated that although the gameplay was fun, it provided little to no challenge during tournament matches.

Publications have compared We Love Golf! to previous entries in the Mario Golf series, particularly Mario Golf: Toadstool Tour. Jon Cartwright writing for Nintendo Life claimed that although it is separate from the Mario Golf series, its "course and UI design feel straight out of Toadstool Tour". Craig Harris of IGN similarly noted how the visuals were derived from Mario Golf: Toadstool Tour "right down to the font used for the game's text". Nintendo World Report's Michael Cole believed "the similarities aren't just skin deep", with the graphics, locations, and core gameplay mechanics reminiscent of "its Toadstool Tour origins". Additionally, Chris Kohler of Wired believed the stylized human characters were reminiscent of the Mario Golf series.

=== Sales ===
By the end of 2007, Capcom was disappointed in the slow sales of We Love Golf! when initially released in Japan. During its first week in Japan, it sold 9,645 copies, and sold around 22,000 copies by the end of 2007. By the end of 2008, it sold 33,777 additional copies, selling a total estimated 55,456 copies.
