= Chain Chomp =

Mario series enemy

- Mario race
- Chain Chomp in Super Smash Bros. Ultimate
- First appearance: Super Mario Bros. 3 (1988)

In-universe information
- Leader: Bowser

Chain Chomp (Japanese: ワンワン, Hepburn: Wanwan) is a species in the Mario franchise. It is a recurring element of Bowser's army, being a metal ball with eyes and a toothy mouth attached to something by a chain typically. It first appeared in Super Mario Bros. 3, and has appeared in multiple games since, including Super Mario 64, Super Mario Odyssey, the Paper Mario series, the Mario Kart series, and Mario Tennis Aces, the latter as a playable character. It has also appeared multiple times in The Legend of Zelda series, most notably in The Legend of Zelda: Link's Awakening where it aides protagonist Link by eating enemies.

Chain Chomp is an animate black metal ball typically chained to an object. The Chain Chomp was based on an experience Miyamoto had as a child being chased by a dog who was stopped by its chain leash. It has received generally positive reception, identified as a particularly frightening enemy in the Mario series. Its appearance in Link's Awakening, known as "BowWow", was also treated as significant by multiple critics.

== Concept and creation ==
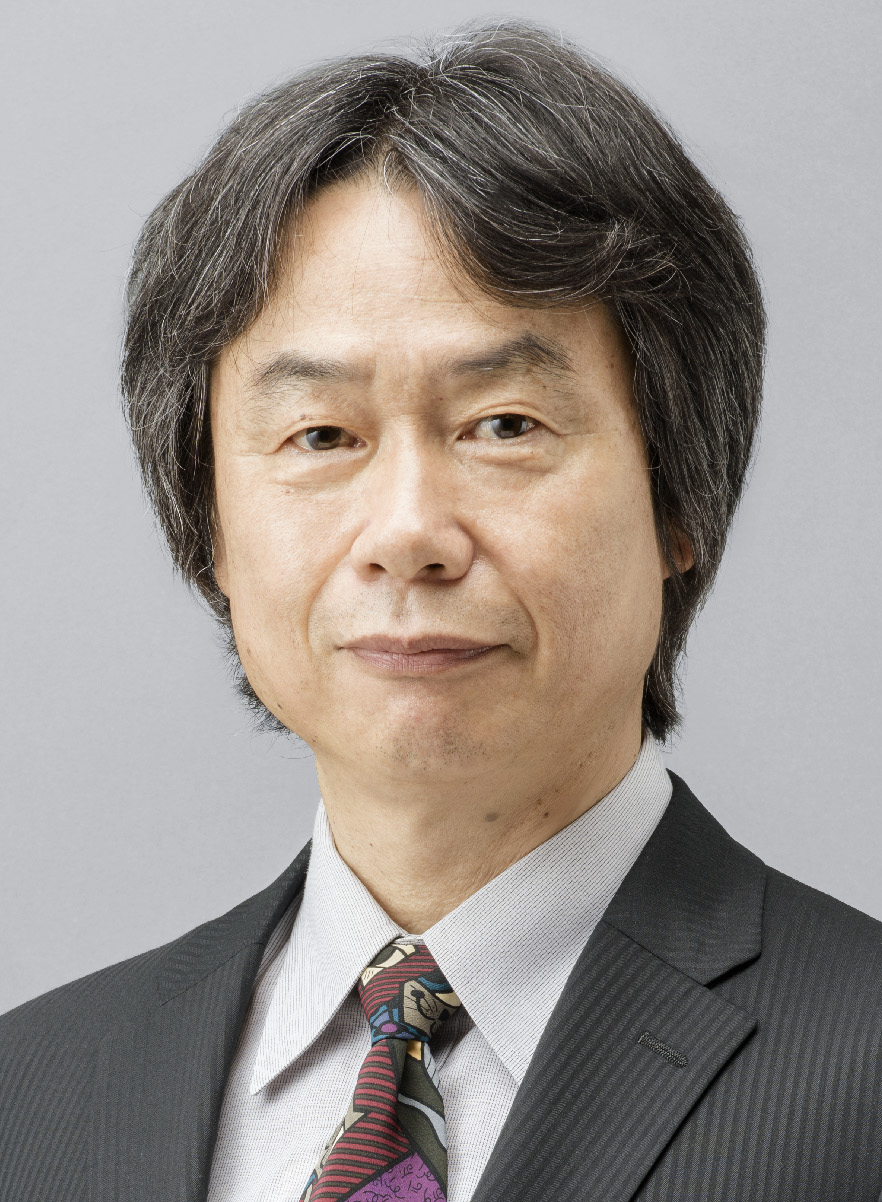
Shigeru Miyamoto, 2015

The Chain Chomp is a black metal ball, typically found chained to an object, featuring eyes and a mouth with sharp teeth. It was inspired by a moment in Mario series creator Shigeru Miyamoto's childhood, where he was chased by a dog, only for the dog to be stopped by the chain on its neck. Concept art for a similar character named "BowWow", originally known as Kelvin in The Legend of Zelda: A Link to the Past's production, was initially made for The Legend of Zelda series; however, another developer discovered the art and repurposed it for the Mario series. Its Japanese name, Wanwan, is inspired by the onomatopoeia for the sound of a dog barking. Starting in Super Mario 64, Chain Chomps would start to bark. Chain Chomps have been depicted to be like dogs within the franchise, with some games such as Paper Mario: The Origami King showing characters petting them. In Super Mario Odyssey, the Chain Chomp went through multiple iterations of headgear, including one made of a fossil, one made of a fossilized egg, and one made of rock. The gold Chain Chomp wears a pink hat based on Madame Broode's. This hat went through multiple designs, including a hat with a feather, a Breton hat, a Capeline hat, a sleep bonnet, and a bunny-ear cap.

== Appearances ==
The Chain Chomp first appears as an enemy in the video game Super Mario Bros. 3, normally unable to reach the protagonist unless he is close. The Chain Chomp intermittently lunges to attack, held back by its chain. After dozens of lunges, its chain will start to flash red, and after three more lunges, it will break free and be able to move freely. A variation of the Chain Chomp, the Flame Chomp, also appears, able to follow the protagonist and spit fire. It is also able to fly. In Super Mario 64, a Chain Chomp appears in the first level, Bob-omb Battlefield, as an enemy. It is chained to a post outside of a cage featuring a collectible star, charging occasionally. The player as Mario can free it by hammering the post into the ground, causing the Chain Chomp to crash into the cage and leave. The game Super Mario Sunshine features creatures called Chain Chomplets, puppy versions of Chain Chomps which need to be doused in water to pacify. Other Mario platformers they and their variations appear in include Super Mario Galaxy and its sequel Super Mario Galaxy 2, Super Mario 3D Land, and multiple New Super Mario Bros. games.

In Super Mario Odyssey, Mario can possess multiple types of Chain Chomps, including a large Chain Chomp and a golden Chain Chomp owned by the boss Madam Broode called Chain Chompikins. This Chain Chomp wears a hat based on Madame Broode's and wears a silk top hat in a later encounter. This possession occurs through the player throwing Mario's cap onto it. Once possessed, the player can pull away from the chain post in order to cause the Chain Chomp to slingshot, which can be used to destroy environmental objects and defeat enemies. The Chain Chomp appears in various Yoshi games, starting with Super Mario World 2: Yoshi's Island. In this game, multiple types of Chain Chomps appear, including ones that leap from the background into the foreground and one that will chase after the protagonist Yoshi, destroying the level behind it. Chain Chomp appears as an enemy in both Super Mario Maker and Super Mario Maker 2, able to be added to custom levels created by players.

In Super Mario RPG, Chain Chomp appears as both an enemy and as a weapon Bowser can wield in battle as an ally. In the 2023 remake, Bowser can use a golden Chain Chomp after the rematch against Punchinello. They also appear in multiple entries of the Paper Mario series, including Paper Mario: Color Splash, with a Chain Chomp named Princess. The ability to pet Chain Chomps in Paper Mario: The Origami King was shared by Nintendo on Twitter and covered by multiple websites, including Jenni Lada of Siliconera and Robert N. Adams of Game Revolution. Lada and Adams both stated that the announcement came due to the recent popularization of being able to pet dogs in games, particularly through a Twitter account that answers whether a dog can be pet or not. Although lacking partners in the final game, a trailer at E3 2010 indicated that Mario would have a Chain Chomp join him in an early version of Paper Mario: Sticker Star.

In addition to the Paper Mario series, Chain Chomps appears in the Mario & Luigi series. In Mario & Luigi: Partners in Time, Chain Chomp appears as a Bros. item. In Mario & Luigi: Paper Jam, Chain Chomp and its paper counterpart appears as enemies in Neo Bowser Castle, with them holded by a Shy Guy; if the Shy Guy is defeated, the Chain Chomps runs away, and they may chase a Paper Fuzzy. In the respective 2017 and 2019 remakes of Mario & Luigi: Superstar Saga and Mario & Luigi: Bowser's Inside Story, Chain Chomp is a recruitable ally in the side modes Minion Quest: The Search for Bowser and Bowser Jr.'s Journey respectively. The original version of the former also featured a robotic Chain Chomp known as Mecha-Chomp. This variant was replaced by Mechakoopas in the remake.

The inclusion of Chain Chomp in Mario Kart 64 as an item was considered, only to be added in the sequel Mario Kart: Double Dash. In this game, the Chain Chomp item was exclusive to baby versions of Mario and Luigi. This was done due to the designers' belief that young kids like cute characters, and thus, they gave the babies a powerful item that was beginner friendly. It has appeared in multiple levels in the Mario Kart series, including Rainbow Road from Mario Kart 64 Peach Gardens in Mario Kart DS, and London Loop from Mario Kart Tour. It appeared in Mario Power Tennis as part of a mode called Chain Chomp Challenge, where the player must hit tennis balls into its mouth. In Mario Tennis Aces, a Chain Chomp is added as a playable character, holding the tennis racket in its mouth. Chain Chomp is set to reappear in 2026's Mario Tennis Fever, possessing a top skill of power. Chain Chomp appears as a summonable character in both Super Smash Bros. for Nintendo 3DS and Wii U and its successor, Super Smash Bros. Ultimate, attacking opponents of the player who summoned it. In Super Mario Strikers, a Chain Chomp can be used to attack multiple opponents and stun them. It appears in multiple mini-games in the Mario Party series, as well as a summon through an item called a Chomp Call, which changes the location of the Star, the ultimate reward, on the map.

Chain Chomp appears in multiple entries of The Legend of Zelda series, originally appearing as an enemy in The Legend of Zelda: A Link to the Past, first located within the Turtle Rock dungeon. Two also appear in The Legend of Zelda: Link's Awakening, added due to Mario-series producer Takashi Tezuka producing the game and him wanting to add it for fun. One is called BowWow, chained in a woman's front yard. BowWow is kidnapped, and after rescuing it, the protagonist Link is allowed to take BowWow with him temporarily. BowWow eats nearby enemies, and is able to eat enemies blocking the entrance to a dungeon. The other Chain Chomp in Link's Awakening is CiaoCiao, who agrees to trade a can of dog food for a ribbon. A Chain Chomp was planned to appear in The Legend of Zelda: Ocarina of Time, only to be cut near the end of development. It would have been placed in the Gerudo Fortress area of the game, trapping protagonist Link in its chains until he breaks out. It was also found in The Legend of Zelda: Four Swords, serving a similar role as BowWow in Link's Awakening. A Chain Chomp also returns in The Legend of Zelda: Four Swords Adventures, appearing as an enemy that can be found in the Kakariko Village level. In the game Hyrule Warriors, the Chain Chomp appears as a weapon the player can use. In Bayonetta on Wii U, the character Bayonetta can dress up as Princess Peach and use a Chain Chomp as a weapon.

=== In other media ===
Chain Chomp has been featured in multiple pieces of merchandise, including a cat bed with the mouth being the opening and a sound-activated toy. It also got a Super Mario Lego set based on it called "Chain Chomp Jungle Encounter". A Lego set called Lego Super Mario 64 ? Block was also released, featuring various settings from Super Mario 64, including a Chain Chomp in one of them.

In The Super Mario Bros. Movie, a Chain Chomp was intended to be included in a scene based on Mario Kart, chasing the racers on the track. The Super Mario Galaxy Movie includes a scene in which Yoshi swallows a Chain Chomp.

== Reception ==
DreadXP writer Joel Couture stated that he found Chain Chomp's initial appearance "unusually frightening." He felt that Mario series enemies normally move at a slow pace, whereas the Chain Chomp was aggressive and ferocious. He experience with this and other forms of the enemy contributed to him considering it among the scariest enemies in the Mario series. A scene in Yoshi's Island where a Chain Chomp eats the level behind Yoshi and chases after him was identified as a frightening scene by Magmix writer Katano. He praised Yoshi's Island for creating an enjoyable gap between the cuteness of the game and scenes like these. Writer Sebastiano M. Cossu praised the implementation of Chain Chomp in Super Mario 64, believing that it was used to teach the players various things, including how to interact with a Chain Chomp and offer the player environmental puzzles to complete. He stated that the puzzle involves not only getting the collectible on its pole, but also trying to figure out how to get rid of the Chain Chomp. The Escapist writer Kyle Orland felt that the Chain Chomp being capable of eventually breaking free in Super Mario Bros. 3 was a defining moment for the game. He felt that the moment exemplified the way the game subverts player's expectations, stating that the broken chain could be emblematic of the designers breaking conventions of platform games, adding that other enemies similarly surprise the player.

Polygon writer Grayson Morley felt that the inclusion of Chain Chomp and other enemies from Mario in Link's Awakening made the dream setting work better, reasoning that it enhances the dream-like setting due to the player having encountered these enemies before. Siliconera writer Jenni Lada appreciated the way Mario Tennis Aces gives personality to Mario series enemies, stating that the Chain Chomp was among her favorites due to being "goofy" and animal-like. IGN writer Audrey Drake remarked that she always wanted a Chain Chomp growing up due in part to its appearance in Link's Awakening, stating that she loved it thanks to it being "ferocious and awesome." She felt that its Super Mario 64 incarnation was a particularly memorable one.

Following the reveal of the Super Crown item in New Super Mario Bros. U Deluxe that transforms the character Toadette into the Princess Peach-like Peachette, fan art and cosplay of fictionalized versions of other Mario characters. One of these characters is Chain Chompette, based on Chain Chomp, also resembling Princess Peach. This character became popular on social media through both cosplay and fan art. Destructoid writer Chris Moyse identified Chain Chompette as his personal favorite of these fan characters.

== See also ==
- List of Mario franchise enemies
