= Mario Tennis Aces =

2018 video game

- Icon artwork, featuring Princess Peach and Mario in the game's tennis attire
- Developer: Camelot Software Planning
- Publisher: Nintendo
- Directors: Shugo Takahashi; Tomohiro Yamamura
- Producers: Hiroyuki Takahashi; Shugo Takahashi; Toshiharu Izuno; Toyokazu Nonaka; Keisuke Terasaki
- Designers: Hiroyuki Takahashi; Shugo Takahashi
- Programmers: Haruki Kodera; Yutaka Yamamoto
- Artists: Satoshi Tamai; Tomoyoshi Yamane
- Composer: Motoi Sakuraba
- Series: Mario Tennis
- Platform: Nintendo Switch
- Release: June 22, 2018
- Genre: Sports (tennis)
- Modes: Single-player, multiplayer

Mario Tennis Aces (Note: マリオテニス エース (Mario Tenisu Ēsu)) is a 2018 sports game developed by Camelot Software Planning and published by Nintendo for the Nintendo Switch. The game is part of the Mario Tennis series and sold over 4.50 million copies by December 31, 2022, making it one of the best-selling games on the Switch.

It received generally favorable reviews from critics, with praise towards the innovations in its gameplay and audiovisual presentation, mixed reactions towards the design of its story mode and its Swing mode, and criticism for its lack of additional modes at launch.

== Gameplay ==
The gameplay of Mario Tennis Aces consists of playing matches of tennis with various characters from the Mario franchise. Players can pick from 16 characters: Mario, Luigi, Wario, Peach, Waluigi, Daisy, Rosalina, Yoshi, Donkey Kong, Bowser, Toad, Toadette, Chain Chomp, Bowser Jr., Boo, and Spike. New characters were added by participating in monthly tournaments, or were added to the roster the following month if the player did not participate. Numerous characters have been added in the game such as; Koopa Troopa in July 2018, Blooper in August 2018, Diddy Kong in September 2018, Birdo in October 2018, Koopa Paratroopa in November 2018, Petey Piranha and Shy Guy in December 2018, Luma in January 2019, Boom Boom in February 2019, Pauline in March 2019, Kamek in April 2019, Dry Bones in May 2019, Fire Piranha Plant in June 2019, and Dry Bowser in July 2019.

Similar in fashion to previous installments of the series, Aces incorporates many techniques, such as "topspins", where the ball travels parallel to the direction hit, "slices", where the ball curves to one side when hit, and "lobs", where the ball travels upwards.

Aces adds several new mechanics to the Mario Tennis series. Using the motion controls of the Joy-Con, the player is able to initiate a "zone shot", where the player can aim directly where the ball will go while the game enters a paused state. If the opponent counters the zone shot, their racket will take damage. When a racket is hit with a zone shot three times, it will break, forcing the player to forfeit the match if it is their last one. Players have multiple rackets to use each match. However, players are able to counter a zone shot without taking damage using a "block", which can be performed by hitting the ball with perfect timing.

Another new addition in Aces is "zone speed". When a player activates zone speed, the match goes into slow-motion, but their character moves at normal speed, making it so faraway shots are easier to reach. The zone shot and zone speed moves use up part of the players' energy gauge, which is filled and depleted throughout the match. To refill the gauge, the player must keep a rally going with the opponent or use the trick shot ability.

The trick shot ability enables the player to quickly travel to where the ball will land. If the trick shot succeeds, then the player's energy gauge will increase dramatically. However, it is easy to misjudge the timing and therefore is a risky move to make. Another ability available to players at the cost of their energy gauge is the special shot. To activate it, the player must have a full energy gauge. The ability unleashes an extremely powerful shot that has the power to break the opponent's racket regardless of its current damage. However, the special shot can be blocked similarly to the zone shot.

Aces also has a "Simple rules" mode, equivalent to the Classic Tennis mode introduced in Mario Tennis: Ultra Smash, where only simple shots are allowed and zone shots, zone speed, trick shots, special shots and the energy gauge are not present.

The game also features an online multiplayer mode, where tournaments can be set up, as well as singular matches. Players can unlock additional outfits and characters by participating in special online Tournaments held by Nintendo. Another gameplay mode is "swing mode", where players are able to swing the Joy-Con controllers to simulate hitting the ball with a tennis racket, similar in fashion to Wii Sports and the New Play Control! version of Mario Power Tennis. In addition to regular tennis matches, the game offers a story mode similar in fashion to Mario Tennis: Power Tour.

== Plot ==
Wario and Waluigi are mining at the Temple of Bask when they discover a treasure chest containing Lucien, a magical racket said to be legendary to those who would possess it. The duo perceive themselves as displaying pride at matches using Lucien, and open up the treasure chest to unveil it. Just as they obtain Lucien, the racket unveils its power and shocks the duo.

The duo soon emerge at Marina Stadium, immediately following a championship match in which Mario and Peach won against Bowser and Bowser Jr. The duo attempt to offer Lucien to Mario, but Luigi snatches it up, after which it begins to take possession of him, Wario, and Waluigi, through use of its grip tape. Mario and Toad then embark on a journey to destroy Lucien and save Wario, Luigi and Waluigi, on Daisy's plea that Luigi will be brought back safely.

Mario and Toad soon arrive at the Bask Ruins, where they meet Aster, guardian of King Bask and watcher over Lucien. Aster tells the backstory of Lucien and how many years ago, King Bask stripped Lucien's power and divided it among five Power Stones hidden on the island, and years later the room fell to ruin, breaking the seal and allowing the racket to fall into new hands. Aster requests that Mario find the Power Stones to end Lucien, once and for all.

Mario obtains the first three Power Stones by defeating Petey Piranha in Piranha Plant Forest, The Mirror Queen in Mirage Mansion, and the Snow Ogre at the summit of Snowfall Mountain respectively. Mario tries to claim the Power Stones in the Savage Sea and Inferno Island, but they are claimed by Wario, Waluigi, and Luigi. Wario and Waluigi decide to settle the score at Marina Stadium; whoever wins receives all five Power Stones.

The Princesses take on Wario and Waluigi while Mario takes on Luigi, with slight power given to the Princesses and Mario by Aster, respectively. They win, allowing them to receive the Power Stones, but Bowser gets ahold of Lucien before this can happen, and makes off to the Temple of Bask with it. Mario confronts him inside the Temple and not only defeats him, but breaks Lucien causing the entire Temple to collapse. With the spirit of King Bask now able to rest in peace, Aster thanks Mario for his heroism throughout the quest.

Back outside, everyone celebrates Mario's victory in banishing Lucien and saving Luigi, Wario and Waluigi, although the latter two are shamed by Daisy for attempting to use Lucien to be the best tennis players. The gang agrees that getting stronger is better than trying to control others.

== Development ==
The developers "consulted with Nintendo numerous times to see what exactly they were looking for and, based on that, made a new game to the best of [their] ability".

The Swing Mode introduced in the game was created as an attempt to improve on the inaccurate motion controls of the Wii New Play Control! version of the GameCube title Mario Power Tennis, which were poorly received and the developers acknowledged their flaws and limitations by stating that they "couldn't really differentiate the shots" and ended up being "far from what [they] wanted". They called the new mode "revenge" for that attempt.

The game features an story mode because, according to the development team, the core difference between handheld and console titles prior to Aces was that handheld ones featured an in-depth story mode. As the Nintendo Switch is a hybrid console that can be played as a handheld or home console, they saw fitting for the game to feature an story mode. In an interview for Mario Golf: Super Rush, Camelot noted how Nintendo did not impose any restrictions on them for the story mode of their games, and they were free to create the story they wanted. Commenting on the differences compared to prior installments, Hiroyuki Takahashi claimed that Camelot's writers "got sick of writing the same story RPG modes in previous Mario Golf and Mario Tennis games where you raise a character who had their sights set on winning a tournament".

The title of the game according to Nintendo, besides referring to expert tennis players, refers to "becoming a sharpshooting ace" by mastering the mechanics of the game.

== Release ==
The game was announced during a Nintendo Direct presentation in January 2018. A free online tournament using a demo version of the game was held from June 1–3, 2018.

== Reception ==
Reception

Aggregate scores
Aggregator	Score
Metacritic	75/100
OpenCritic	56% recommend (Note: Based on 109 reviews)

Review scores
Publication	Score
Game Informer	8/10
GameRevolution	4/5
GameSpot	7/10
GamesRadar+	4/5
IGN	7.5/10
Nintendo Life	8/10
VideoGamer.com	7/10
Digital Trends	7/10

Mario Tennis Aces received "generally favorable" reviews from critics, according to the review aggregation website Metacritic. Fellow review aggregator OpenCritic assessed that the game received strong approval, being recommended by 56% of critics.

IGN felt that Mario Tennis Aces was "an extremely fun arcade tennis experience, colourful and dazzling to look at and smartly balanced in its back-and-forth play." Although praise went to its new mechanics for making the game "far more fun, well balanced and less gimmicky brand of superpowered tennis than that of its disappointing Wii U predecessor, Mario Tennis: Ultra Smash," Aces' adventure mode was criticized for feeling underdeveloped and not having enough replay value (such as harder versions of challenges after completing it) or unlocks, and that the main multiplayer modes lacked court selection and local tournament functions. GameSpot felt that Mario Tennis Aces "does what this series has done best, and improves what it's rarely gotten right prior", and arguing that the adventure mode was a good way for existing players to learn the new mechanics of Aces, but that the Swing Mode had imprecise motion detection, and that the game's multiplayer modes were lacking in options, and did not display stats for opponents.

=== Sales ===
Mario Tennis Aces sold 247,161 physical copies within its first month on sale in Japan. By March 2019, total sales had reached over 2.64 million copies, making it the best-selling Mario Tennis game. As of March 2019, it has sold 550,000 copies in Japan. The 2022 CESA Games White Papers revealed that Mario Tennis Aces had sold 4.28 million units, as of December 31, 2021. By December 31 2022, this figure had risen to 4.50 million units.

=== Accolades ===
Year	Award	Category	Result	Ref(s).
2018	Game Critics Awards	Best Sports Game	Nominated	
2018	Game Critics Awards	Best Family/Social Game	Nominated	
2018	Golden Joystick Awards	Best Competitive Game	Nominated	
2018	Golden Joystick Awards	Nintendo Game of the Year	Nominated	
2018	The Game Awards 2018	Best Family Game	Nominated	
2018	The Game Awards 2018	Best Sports/Racing	Nominated	
2018	Gamers' Choice Awards	Fan Favorite Family-Friendly Multiplayer Game	Nominated	
2018	Australian Games Awards	Sports, Racing or Fighting Title of the Year	Nominated	
2019	New York Game Awards	Raging Bull Award for Best Fighting Game	Nominated	
2019	22nd Annual D.I.C.E. Awards	Sports Game of the Year	Won	
2019	National Academy of Video Game Trade Reviewers Awards	Game, Franchise Sports	Nominated	
2019	Italian Video Game Awards	People's Choice	Nominated	
2019	Italian Video Game Awards	Best Family Game	Nominated	
2019	Italian Video Game Awards	Best Sport Game	Nominated	
