= Pauline (Nintendo) =

Fictional character in Nintendo's Mario and Donkey Kong franchises

- Mario and Donkey Kong character
- Pauline, as depicted in Super Mario Odyssey
- First game: Donkey Kong (1981)
- Created by: Shigeru Miyamoto
- Designed by: Shigeru Miyamoto; Yōichi Kotabe
- Voiced by: Various: Jo Belle Yonely (1983; Donkey Kong Cereal commercials); Judy Strangis (1983–1984; Saturday Supercade); Kate Higgins (2017–present); Aimi Mukohara (2017; singing voice in Super Mario Odyssey, Japanese version); Jessica DiCicco (The Super Mario Bros. Movie); Jenny Kidd (2025; Donkey Kong Bananza, English version and singing voice); Yurianne Eve (2025; Donkey Kong Bananza, Japanese version)
- Portrayed by: Sally Klein (Donkey Kong ColecoVision commercial)

Pauline (Japanese: ポリーン, Hepburn: Porīn) is a character from the Mario and Donkey Kong video game franchises by Nintendo. She was created by the Japanese video game designer Shigeru Miyamoto and debuted as the Lady, (Note: Japanese: レディ, Hepburn: Redi) the damsel in distress of the 1981 arcade game Donkey Kong. In the game, she is kidnapped by Donkey Kong and must be rescued by her love interest, Mario.

She is one of the earliest examples of the damsel in distress archetype in video games, a trope that persisted in the following decades. Pauline was replaced by Princess Peach as Mario's love interest in the Super Mario series, though she continued to appear as Mario's friend in the Mario vs. Donkey Kong series. In 2017, she reappeared as a supporting character in Super Mario Odyssey with a new role as the mayor of New Donk City. She has since appeared as a player character in various Mario spin-off games, such as Mario Tennis Aces, Mario Kart Tour, Mario Golf: Super Rush, Mario Strikers: Battle League, Mario Kart 8 Deluxe, Super Mario Party Jamboree, Mario Kart World, and Mario Tennis Fever. In 2025, a teenage Pauline appeared in Donkey Kong Bananza, where she was portrayed as Donkey Kong's sidekick.

== Concept and creation ==
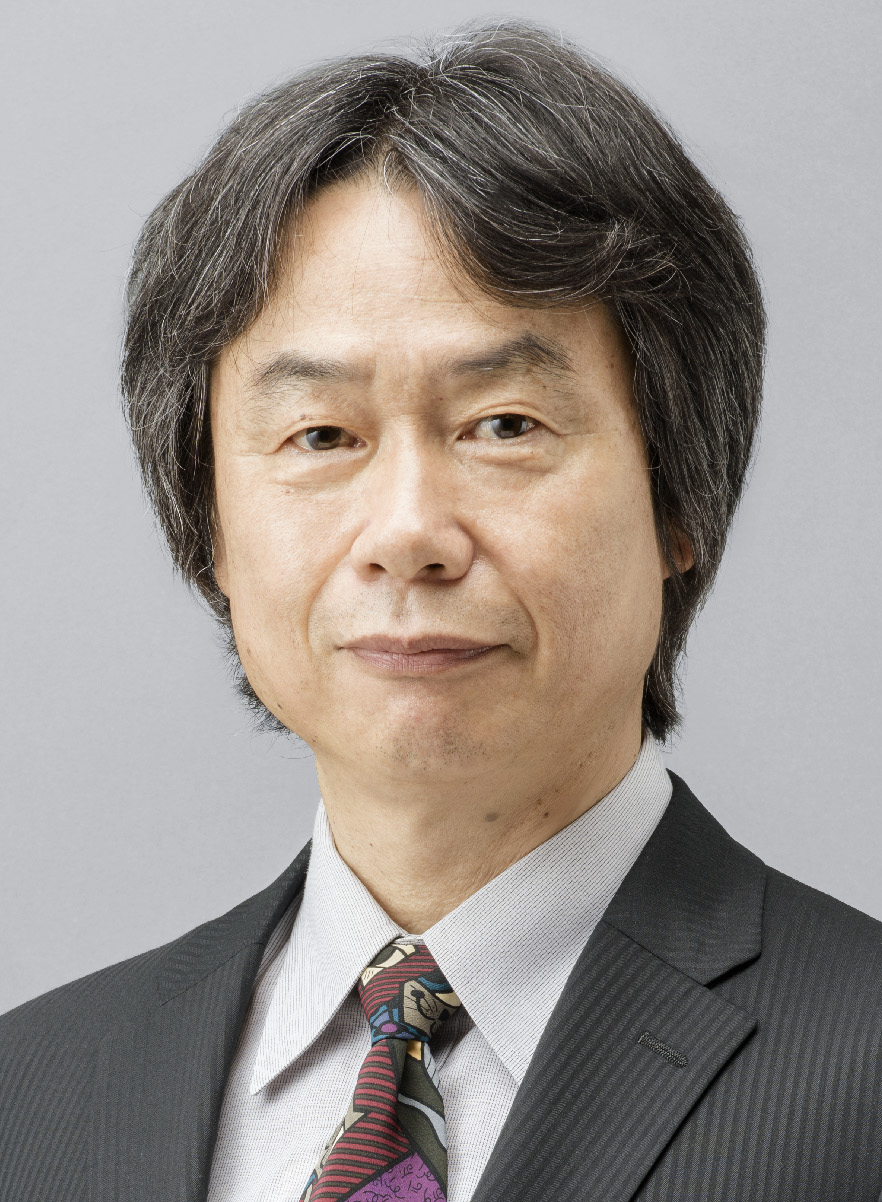
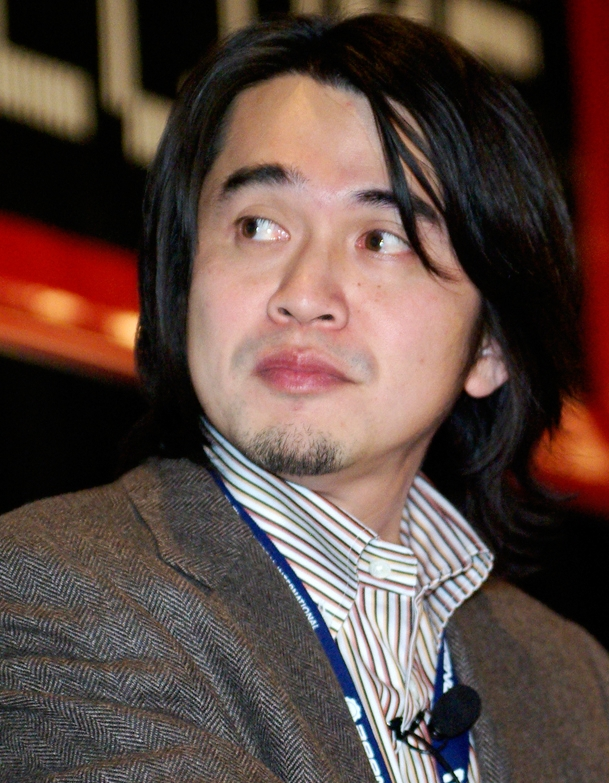
Shigeru Miyamoto (left) created Pauline, and Yoshiaki Koizumi (right) co-produced Odyssey, her major return.

Pauline was created by Shigeru Miyamoto and other developers for the 1981 arcade game Donkey Kong. She is the first female character in a video game with a speaking role and is cited as an example of a damsel in distress in fiction.

Miyamoto initially planned to use the characters Popeye, Bluto and Olive Oyl from the Popeye franchise, but when he failed to obtain the license, he created them as Jumpman (Mario), Donkey Kong and Pauline. Originally, Pauline was known as Lady and the game introduced her as Mario's girlfriend. The name Pauline was given after the then-girlfriend of Nintendo of America's warehouse manager, Don James. It was then used in licensed products after the game's release including a collection of figures by Coleco and was eventually used for the NES version of the game, although print ads for the Game & Watch version of the game refer to her as Louise.

Captured by Donkey Kong atop a New York City construction site, the official artwork depicted her disheveled like King Kong's Ann Darrow during that film's climax. Cartoonist Leslie Cabarga was hired to create the two-page Donkey Kong advertisement for print publications. His art style was influenced by the golden-age cartoons made by Fleischer Studios. Despite not having prior knowledge of the game, he took inspiration for Pauline from Betty Boop and drew her in a similar style.

The sounds in Donkey Kong were produced by Hirokazu Tanaka, who attempted to use a voice synthesizer to create Pauline's voice with unsatisfactory results. Miyamoto said that although she initially had English voice lines, they were replaced by sound effects. She originally cried "Help, help!" and said "Nice!" when Mario jumped. Miyamoto explained that an English teacher was asked to listen to the voice lines due to pronunciation concerns and said that it sounded like she was saying "Kelp!", so voices were abandoned.

Super Mario Odyssey producer Yoshiaki Koizumi said that Pauline was chosen as the mayor of New Donk City because the development team wanted the setting to resonate with players and knew that Pauline was a familiar character. He said that she sang the game's theme song, "Jump Up, Super Star!" as she was being developed more as a character and was going to be interested in jazz. Kate Higgins provided the English voice for Pauline for both the song and the game.

== Appearances ==
=== Video games ===
Pauline debuted as Mario's love interest in Donkey Kong (1981), which was remade for Game Boy, where she was again a typical damsel in distress. She was planned to appear in the Famicom educational game, titled Donkey Kong no Ongaku Asobi (Donkey Kong's Music Play), in which she would be a singer and frontwoman of a band. However, the game was cancelled due to gameplay and music licensing issues.

Reappearances of Pauline occurred in Pinball and Famicom BASIC. Outside of Donkey Kong ports and re-releases, she did not make any further appearances until her reintroduction in Mario vs. Donkey Kong 2: March of the Minis. She would appear in all subsequent entries in the Mario vs. Donkey Kong series.

In 2017, Super Mario Odyssey marked her debut in the Super Mario series. She is the singer of "Jump Up, Super Star!" and "Break Free (Lead the Way)". Initially a damsel in distress, Super Mario Odyssey changed her role. She is now the singer of the band The Super Mario Players and the mayor of New Donk City. She serves as a supporting character, helping Mario with his quest.

In Super Smash Bros. Ultimate, she, along with her band, appear on the New Donk City stage; by interacting with them, the player can add extra instruments and vocals to the music. Pauline herself is also featured as a collectible Spirit utilizing her Super Mario Odyssey artwork. In March 2019, Pauline made her debut in a Mario sports spinoff as a playable DLC character in Mario Tennis Aces. In September 2019, she made her racing debut in Mario Kart Tour. She is also a playable DLC character in Mario Kart 8 Deluxe. She has also appeared as a playable character in Mario Golf: Super Rush and Mario Strikers: Battle League. Pauline made her Mario Party debut in the game, Super Mario Party Jamboree. In June 2025, she appeared as a playable character in Mario Kart World.

A young Pauline appears in Donkey Kong Bananza (2025), serving as Donkey Kong's companion. She has the ability to use her singing voice to transform Donkey Kong into other forms and, in the game's multiplayer mode, fire exploding projectiles.

Pauline appears as one of 38 playable characters in the game Mario Tennis Fever.

=== Other media ===
Pauline appears as a regular character in Saturday Supercade in the Donkey Kong episodes of the television series. Voiced by Judy Strangis, Pauline plays the role of Mario's assistant or partner and is often seen alongside him in the various episodes. The two work together to capture Donkey Kong throughout the series. Pauline can also be seen helping Stanley the Bugman in an episode.

Pauline makes a cameo appearance in The Super Mario Bros. Movie (2023) where she serves as the mayor of New York City and is interviewed during a flooding crisis. This incarnation of the character is voiced by Jessica DiCicco.

== Reception ==
Pauline's history as Mario's girlfriend was noted by Mike Fahey of Kotaku, who commented that while Mario and Princess Peach have become "iconic" characters in gaming, "no one gives a damn" about what happened to Pauline. IGN commented that Pauline was the character that "started it all" by being the captive of Donkey Kong and likened her tight red dress to Jessica Rabbit. ABC described her as "the great forgotten character of the Nintendo universe" and charted Pauline's relationship with Mario, highlighting that Nintendo clearly illustrated their love in Donkey Kong by a pink heart but afterwards she was completely forgotten and later downgraded to Mario's friend. Christopher Hooton writing for The Independent noted that Pauline had been swiftly replaced by Princess Peach as Mario's love interest for over 25 years, while Pauline "has remained drifting on the fringes of Mario titles, her story only being advanced by the unrequited libidinous advances of Donkey Kong". Writing in Popular Culture Review, G. Christopher Williams and Brady Simenson considered Pauline's lack of nobility to be significant. Drawing parallels with the fictional King Kong filmmaker Carl Denham who seeks an actress in New York City and finds Ann Darrow, they argued that Mario, as a working-class character, climbs up to reach Pauline as a method of social mobility, particularly as Pauline is depicted with a slightly higher social status.

Author Nathan Altice highlighted the similarities in Pauline's design to Fay Wray, the archetypal damsel in distress of King Kong, but also opined that her long dress, long hair and boots bore similarities to the 19th century Wild West. He also compared her attire and role as damsel to the silent film serials of the 1910s, particularly The Perils of Pauline. Ethan Gach from Kotaku described Pauline's role in the 1981 Donkey Kong game as "one of the earliest examples of the 'damsel in distress' trope that would haunt games for decades to come". He opined that although Shigeru Miyamoto had explained Nintendo's reliance on damsels by stating that the game has been designed for male gamers in arcades, it was actually the result of applying "outdated notions of identity and gender roles after the fact instead of at the start". Tim Mulkerin of Mic said that Pauline diverged from other love interests of Mario by being a "run-of-the-mill, absurdly-beautiful-yet-helpless human woman" rather than a princess, but thought that her conversion from damsel to empowered politician in Super Mario Odyssey was a "fun inversion of a tired trope".

After her reappearance in Super Mario Odyssey, her character was praised for overcoming the damsel in distress archetype to become a woman of power. Bleeding Cool wrote about how it was a "big deal" for Pauline's sudden return, feeling it was an injustice that she had been relegated to merely a plot point until then, citing it as "one hell of a patriarchy-smashing comeback". Paste writer Holly Green included Mayor Pauline as one of the best new game characters of 2017, stating that her career and talent as a singer made her an aspirational figure, while also describing her as "one of the oldest and most overlooked characters in the Mario universe". Nadia Oxford of USGamer included Pauline in a list of best new Nintendo characters of the past decade, commenting that she admired the character for ruling New Donk City with a "perfumed iron fist". GameRevolution highlighted that following her appearance in Mario Tennis Aces, players responded positively to her sex appeal and noted that she had inspired a dedicated fanbase.

In 2013, game developer Mike Mika ignited a gender role debate on social media after writing about his game mod of Donkey Kong, which he developed for his daughter who said that she wanted to save Mario in the game and play as Pauline. After replacing the game sprites to make Pauline the player character, his progress was posted online.
