= Laura Faye Smith =

American voice actress

- Born: May 10, 1971 (age 55); Los Angeles, California, U.S.
- Education: Oregon State University (BA)
- Occupation: Voice actress
- Years active: 1994–present
- Employer: DDO Artist's Agency
- Website: www.laurafayesmith.com

Laura Faye Smith (born May 10, 1971) is an American voice actress. She is the voice of the Mario series characters Rosalina from Super Mario 3D World onward, and Baby Rosalina from Dr. Mario World and the Mario Kart series.

== Bibliography ==
Smith received her Bachelor of Arts in theater and from Oregon State University and is based in Los Angeles, California.

== Personal life ==
She has one sister named Lisa.

== Filmography ==
=== Anime ===
List of dubbing performances in anime
Year	Title	Role	Notes	Ref.
2021-22	JoJo's Bizarre Adventure: Stone Ocean	Additional voices		

=== Video games ===
List of voice performances in video games
Year	Title	Role	Notes	Ref.
2013-present	Mario series	Rosalina		
2016	Fire Emblem Fates	Male Kana		
2020	Genshin Impact	Noelle		
2023	Granblue Fantasy Versus: Rising	Death		

=== Other ===
Audiodramas
Year	Title	Role	Notes	Ref.
2020-present	The Sojourn	Tamara "Meds" Melari		
