= Gikyokuonsou =

Studio album by Motoi Sakuraba
- Released: October 3, 1991
- Genre: Progressive rock
- Length: 45:15
- Label: Made in Japan Records

Gikyokuonsou (戯曲音創) is a progressive rock album by Japanese musician Motoi Sakuraba. It was originally released on October 3, 1991, by Made in Japan Records, later by the French label Musea and in 2011 by Diskunion.

== Track listing ==
1. "Humpty Dumpty" – 6:26
2. "Tone Access" – 3:46
3. "Byzantium" – 6:00
4. "Motion" – 8:15
5. "Paradigm" – 4:01
6. "Narratage" - 5:20
7. "Scrap and Build" – 5:43
8. "Drama Composition" – 5:44

== Personnel ==
- Motoi Sakuraba – keyboards, composer, arranger
- Ken Ishita – bass
- Takeo Shimoda – drums
