= Beyond the Beyond =

1995 role-playing video game

- Developer: Camelot Software Planning (Note: Sony Computer Entertainment Japan assisted on development.)
- Publisher: Sony Computer Entertainment
- Director: Shugo Takahashi
- Producer: Shugo Takahashi
- Programmers: Kenji Numaya; Masashi Muramori; Makoto Yamamoto
- Artist: Ami Shibata
- Writer: Shugo Takahashi
- Composer: Motoi Sakuraba
- Platform: PlayStation
- Release: JP: November 3, 1995; NA: September 11, 1996
- Genre: Role-playing
- Mode: Single-player

Beyond the Beyond (Note: known in Japan as Beyond the Beyond: Harukanaru Kanān e (Note: Japanese: ビヨンド ザ ビヨンド ～遥かなるカナーンへ～, Hepburn: Biyondo za Biyondo ～ Harukanaru Kanān e～; lit. "Beyond the Beyond: To Far Away Kanaan")) is a 1995 role-playing video game developed by Camelot Software Planning and published by Sony Computer Entertainment for the PlayStation. Though not the first role-playing game released for the PlayStation, Beyond the Beyond was the first RPG available in the west for the console using a traditional Japanese RPG gameplay style like Final Fantasy, Dragon Quest and Phantasy Star. The characters were designed by manga artist Ami Shibata of Papuwa fame.

== Gameplay ==
Random battles are an important part of gameplay in Beyond the Beyond.

Gameplay in Beyond the Beyond is, for the most part, standard for a role-playing video game. However, the turn-based battle system does contain one feature that was not standard in role-playing games at the time. Dubbed the "Active Playing System", this feature allows the player to increase the chances of either landing an improved attack on an enemy or defending from an enemy attack by pressing the X button at the correct time during battle. It is similar to the timing-based attacks in the later role-playing game Final Fantasy VIII (1999).

== Plot ==
Long ago in the world of Beyond the Beyond, a battle raged between the 'Beings of Light' and the 'Warlocks of the Underworld'. Before the planet was destroyed, the two sides signed a treaty leaving the surface world to the Beings of Light and underground to the Warlocks. After hundreds of years of peace, inexplicable happenings begin to occur. The player must control Finn, a young swordsman, to stop the evil power that has broken the treaty and invaded the surface world.

== Development ==
The soundtrack was composed by Motoi Sakuraba, who later worked on other Camelot Soft titles such as Shining Force III and the Golden Sun series. It is the first of two video games Camelot Software Planning developed for the PlayStation, the other being Everybody's Golf. Sony's internal development studio assisted on development.

For the North American release, Beyond the Beyond was translated into English by four production personnel at Sony Computer Entertainment America.

== Reception ==
Reception

Aggregate score
Aggregator	Score
GameRankings	44.38%

Review scores
Publication	Score
AllGame	1.5/5
Electronic Gaming Monthly	8/10, 6.5/10, 7.5/10, 8/10
EP Daily	6/10
Famitsu	28/40
Game Informer	6.75/10
Game Players	6.8/10
GameFan	80/100, 79/100, 77/100
GameRevolution	C
GameSpot	5.5/10
IGN	4/10
Next Generation	2/5
RPGamer	1/5, 1.5/5, 1.5/5
Dengeki PlayStation	75/100, 70/100, 70/100, 75/100

Critical assessments of Beyond the Beyond were divided upon its release: (Note: Attributed to multiple references:) While Shawn Smith and Sushi-X of Electronic Gaming Monthly found it to be an impressive RPG, Dan Hsu and Crispin Boyer in the same publication and Glenn Rubenstein in GameSpot deemed it derivative and underwhelming, though still a solid and satisfying enough experience for fans of the genre, GamePro's Lawrence Neves considered it outright "lame and predictable", and Next Generation described it as "painfully derivative, plodding, and not even a terribly challenging adventure". However, there were points of agreement, with even the most positive reviews remarking that the game has a very generic RPG visual style and simply does not look like a next generation RPG, though some also remarked that the 3D battle graphics are impressive. (Note: Attributed to multiple references:)

Most reviews said that the story is highly derivative and suffers from overlong, dull dialogues, though Next Generation, which otherwise gave one of the more negative reviews, said the story was pleasingly long and interesting. (Note: Attributed to multiple references:) While Smith and Hsu praised the music, Rubenstein, Neves, and IGN all called it tepid and generic, and criticized that it is in MIDI format instead of the high quality Red Book audio that was by this time standard for CD games. Another common criticism was that the battles are excessively frequent.

The game maintains a 44% average rating on GameRankings, from 8 reviews. In a retrospective review, Andrew Long of RPGamer argued that the extensive time it takes to complete the game is due mostly to long and complex dungeons, frequent random encounters, and the steep difficulty of bosses.
