= Motoi Sakuraba =

Japanese composer and keyboardist (born 1965)

- 桜庭 統
- Born: August 5, 1965 (age 61); Akita Prefecture, Japan
- Education: Meiji University
- Occupations: Composer; keyboardist
- Years active: 1984–present
- Musical career
- Genres: Progressive rock; symphonic rock; orchestral; video game music
- Instruments: Piano; electronic organ; synthesizer
- Labels: TEAM Entertainment; Scarlet Moon

Motoi Sakuraba (桜庭 統, Sakuraba Motoi; born August 5, 1965) is a Japanese composer and keyboardist. Sakuraba is known for his numerous contributions in video games, including the Tales, Star Ocean, Mario Golf, Mario Tennis, Golden Sun, and Dark Souls series, as well as several other anime series, television dramas, and progressive rock albums.

== Career ==
Sakuraba was born on August 5, 1965, in Akita Prefecture, Japan. While attending Meiji University, Sakuraba began to take music composition seriously and formed the progressive rock band "Clashed Ice" in 1984, consisting of him on keyboards and Genta Kudo on drums and vocals. After the duo had graduated the following year, they were noticed by music producer Shingo Ueno, and ending up signing with Made in Japan Records. The band had then added bassist Tetsuya Nagatsuma, and was renamed as "Deja Vu". In 1988, the band would release their only studio album, Baroque in the Future, composed by Sakuraba. Although the band disbanded in 1989, Sakuraba would later go on to release another solo album, Gikyokuonsou, in 1991.

In late 1989, Sakuraba began working as a composer for Wolf Team, joining Masaaki Uno and Yasunori Shiono. The professional friendships formed here in Sakuraba's early years have resulted in a great demand for his composing and arranging abilities. In 1994, former Wolf Team director and composer Masaaki Uno started working at Camelot Software Planning as a coordinator and sound director, developing games for Sony, Sega and Nintendo. Sakuraba has been called upon as a composer for many Camelot games, including all of the games in the Mario Golf, Mario Tennis, and Golden Sun series.

In 1995, Wolf Team developed the breakthrough game Tales of Phantasia for Namco. This and other early games in the Tales series primarily featured Sakuraba and fellow Wolf Team co-worker Shinji Tamura as composers. Also in 1995, former Wolf Team director and producer Jun Asanuma, as well as Tales of Phantasia writer and programmer Yoshiharu Gotanda, founded tri-Ace with financial backing from Enix. The Star Ocean and Valkyrie Profile games have been their main franchises. Sakuraba has been the composer for nearly all of their games.

In 1999, long time Sakuraba sound designer and programmer Hiroya Hatsushiba, a former member of Wolf Team and tri-Ace, founded tri-Crescendo. While initially continuing to contribute sound work to tri-Ace games, tri-Crescendo began game development in 2001. Together with Monolith Soft, tri-Crescendo started working on Baten Kaitos: Eternal Wings and the Lost Ocean; Namco provided the financial backing. Hatsushiba, as director and main programmer of the project, again called upon Sakuraba's composing services. This has extended to the sequel, Baten Kaitos Origins, and Eternal Sonata. The remnants of Wolf Team later morphed into the Namco Telenet joint subsidiary Namco Tales Studio in 2003.

In 2007, Sakuraba was selected to join a long list of video game composers to arrange music for Super Smash Bros. Brawl. He chose to arrange the famous "Menu Theme" from the game's predecessor, Super Smash Bros. Melee. He also arranged "Gourmet Race" from Kirby Super Star, "Jungle Level Ver.2" from Donkey Kong Country, "Mario Tennis / Mario Golf" from Mario Golf: Toadstool Tour and Mario Power Tennis, "Victory Road" from Pokémon Ruby and Sapphire, the "Airship Theme" from Super Mario Bros. 3, the "Battlefield Theme", "Final Destination", and "Battle Scene / Final Boss (Golden Sun)" from Golden Sun: The Lost Age.

Sakuraba then continued to write music for games in franchises he has worked with before, including Star Ocean: The Last Hope, Golden Sun: Dark Dawn, Mario Tennis Open, Mario Golf: World Tour, and many Tales series games, including Hearts, Graces, Xillia, Xillia 2, Zestiria, and Berseria. He has also contributed to other well known games such as the Dark Souls series, Kid Icarus: Uprising, and Phantasy Star Nova. In 2014, he was selected to provide musical arrangements for Brawl's successor, Super Smash Bros. for Nintendo 3DS and Wii U. For this title, Sakuraba arranged "Theme from Area 6 / Missile Slipstream" from Star Fox 64 and Star Fox Command, "Battle! (Team Flare)" from Pokémon X and Y, and "The valedictory elegy" from Baten Kaitos Origins.

In addition, Sakuraba has continued to write for non-gaming and anime projects, including solo albums such as "Forest of Glass", "What's Up?", and "Passage", as well as performing on several arrange albums. In the 2020s, he composed for games such as One Piece Odyssey and Eiyuden Chronicle: Hundred Heroes.

=== Live performances ===
During July 2003, Sakuraba held a live concert in Tokyo, Japan. He performed progressive rock interpretations of his music from games Star Ocean: Till the End of Time, Star Ocean: The Second Story, Star Ocean: Blue Sphere and Valkyrie Profile. His bandmates for this concert were bassist Atsushi Hasegawa (a member of the band Gerard) and drummer Toshihiko Nakamura. As noted, this concert was released on DVD and CD. At the same time as they were rehearsing for the concert, Hasegawa and Nakamura assisted in recording new material for the Director's Cut of Star Ocean: Till the End of Time.

The following year, the trio performed another concert. The venue was smaller, but included music from Baten Kaitos and a couple of new, non-game-related pieces. This concert was not officially recorded and released, however. However, in 2006, a new concert was given in celebration of tri-Ace's Valkyrie Profile: Silmeria.

In September 2011, Sakuraba and his band joined up with the Earthbound Papas in Kawasaki, led by former Final Fantasy series composer Nobuo Uematsu, to perform at Fantasy Rock Fest 2011. The event featured game music performances, along with new progressive rock pieces from both bands. The first six tracks that Sakuraba and his band played were sold at the event as a preview CD for his then-upcoming solo album After all..., which was released by Strange Days Records on October 19, 2011.

In June 2015, Sakuraba performed at the Tales of Festival at the Yokohama Arena, being the first time he performed tracks from the Tales series at a live event. A selection of Sakuraba's music from the Dark Souls and Tales series was performed live at the Salle Pleyel concert hall in Paris in February 2017. The event, known as "Orchestral Memories", featured a guest appearance by Sakuraba. The 2020 Tales of Festival featured an original song by him called "Endless Journey", dedicated to the 25th anniversary of the series.

== Works ==
Note: this list is not comprehensive and consists mostly of notable works.

=== Video games ===
List of video games scored
Year	Title	Role(s)
1989	Arcus II: Silent Symphony	Music with Masaaki Uno and Yasunori Shiono
1990	Granada	Music with Masaaki Uno
1990	Zan: Yasha Enbukyoku	Music
1990	Final Zone	Music with Masaaki Uno
1990	Sol-Feace	Music
1991	Arcus Odyssey	Music
1991	El Viento	Music
1991	Earnest Evans	Music
1992	Sol-Deace	Music
1992	Earnest Evans	Music; Sega Genesis version
1993	Anett Futatabi	Music
1994	Hiōden: Mamono-tachi tono Chikai	Music with Hiroya Hatsushiba and Shinji Tamura
1994	Tenshi no Uta: Shiroki Tsubasa no Inori	Music with Shinji Tamura
1995	Beyond the Beyond	Music
1995	Tales of Phantasia	Music with Shinji Tamura and Ryota Furuya
1996	Star Ocean	Music
1996	Shining the Holy Ark	Music
1997	Everybody's Golf	Music
1997	Shining Force III	Music
1997	Tales of Destiny	Music with Shinji Tamura
1998	Star Ocean: The Second Story	Music
1999	Mario Golf	Music
1999	Mario Golf GB	Music
1999	Valkyrie Profile	Music
2000	Mario Tennis	Music
2000	Mario Tennis GB	Music
2000	Tales of Phantasia: Narikiri Dungeon	Music with Shinji Tamura and Toshiki Aida
2000	Tales of Eternia	Music with Shinji Tamura
2001	Mobile Golf	Music
2001	Star Ocean: Blue Sphere	Music
2001	Golden Sun	Music
2002	Golden Sun: The Lost Age	Music
2002	Tales of Destiny 2	Music with Shinji Tamura
2003	Star Ocean: Till the End of Time	Music
2003	Mario Golf: Toadstool Tour	Music
2003	Tales of Symphonia	Music with Shinji Tamura and Takeshi Arai
2003	Baten Kaitos: Eternal Wings and the Lost Ocean	Music
2004	Tales of Tactics	Music
2004	Mario Golf: Advance Tour	Music
2004	Mario Power Tennis	Music
2004	Tales of Rebirth	Music with Shinji Tamura
2005	Tales of Breaker	Music
2005	Mario Tennis: Power Tour	Music
2005	Tales of Commons	Music
2005	Tales of the Abyss	Music with Shinji Tamura
2006	Baten Kaitos Origins	Music
2006	Valkyrie Profile: Lenneth	Music
2006	Tales of Eternia Online	Music
2006	Tales of Wahrheit	Music
2006	Valkyrie Profile 2: Silmeria	Music
2006	Tales of the Tempest	Music
2006	Tales of the World: Radiant Mythology	Music with Takuya Yasuda and Go Shiina
2007	Eternal Sonata	Music
2007	Drone Tactics	Music
2007	We Love Golf!	Music
2007	Star Ocean: First Departure	Music
2008	Super Smash Bros. Brawl	Arrangements (Note: "Menu (Super Smash Bros. Melee)", "Airship Theme (Super Mario Bros. 3)", "Mario Tennis / Mario Golf", "Jungle Level Ver.2", "Gourmet Race", "Victory Road" and "Battle Scene / Final Boss (Golden Sun)")
2008	Tales of the World: Material Dungeon	Music
2008	The Idolmaster Live For You!	"Contradiction"
2008	Star Ocean: Second Evolution	Music
2008	Tales of Symphonia: Dawn of the New World	Music with Shinji Tamura
2008	Tales of Vesperia	Music with Shinji Tamura
2008	Infinite Undiscovery	Music
2008	Valkyrie Profile: Covenant of the Plume	Music
2008	Otomedius G	Arranged two tracks
2008	Tales of Hearts	Music with Shinji Tamura and Hiroshi Tamura
2009	Tales of the World: Radiant Mythology 2	Music with several others
2009	Star Ocean: The Last Hope	Music
2009	Half-Minute Hero	Music with several others
2009	Tales of VS.	Music with several others
2009	Valhalla Knights: Eldar Saga	Music
2009	Tales of Graces	Music with Shinji Tamura
2010	Resonance of Fate	Music with Kohei Tanaka
2010	Tales of Phantasia: Narikiri Dungeon X	Music with Shinji Tamura
2010	Golden Sun: Dark Dawn	Music
2010	Tales of Graces f	Music with Shinji Tamura
2011	Tales of the World: Radiant Mythology 3	Music with several others
2011	Otomedius Excellent	Music with several others
2011	Half-Minute Hero: The Second Coming	Music with several others
2011	Tales of Xillia	Music
2011	Dark Souls	Music
2012	Beyond the Labyrinth	Music
2012	Tales of the Heroes: Twin Brave	Music with Go Shiina
2012	Kid Icarus: Uprising	Music with several others (Note: Yuzo Koshiro, Masafumi Takada, Noriyuki Iwadare, Takahiro Nishi, and Yasunori Mitsuda)
2012	Mario Tennis Open	Music
2012	Steel Battalion: Heavy Armor	Main theme
2012	Dark Souls: Artorias of the Abyss	Music
2012	Bravely Default	Keyboards
2012	Tales of Xillia 2	Music
2013	Tales of Hearts R	Music with Kazuhiro Nakamura
2013	Valhalla Knights 3	Music
2013	Tales of Symphonia Chronicles	Music with Shinji Tamura and Takeshi Arai
2014	Dark Souls II	Music with Yuka Kitamura
2014	Mario Golf: World Tour	Music
2014	Super Smash Bros. for Nintendo 3DS and Wii U	Arrangements (Note: "Theme from Area 6/ Missile Slipstream", "Battle! (Team Flare)" and "The Valedictory Elegy")
2014	Phantasy Star Nova	Music
2015	Tales of Zestiria	Music with Go Shiina
2015	Dark Souls II: Scholar of the First Sin	Music with Yuka Kitamura
2015	Mario Tennis: Ultra Smash	Music
2015	Exist Archive	Music
2016	Dark Souls III	Music with Yuka Kitamura, Tsukasa Saitoh, and Nobuyoshi Suzuki
2016	Star Ocean: Integrity and Faithlessness	Music
2016	Valkyrie Anatomia	Music
2016	Tales of Berseria	Music
2016	Star Ocean: Anamnesis	Music
2017	Mario Sports Superstars	Music
2018	Mario Tennis Aces	Music
2018	Dragon Star Varnir	Main theme and battle music
2018	Monster Boy and the Cursed Kingdom	Music with several others (Note: Yuzo Koshiro, Michiru Yamane, Keiki Kobayashi, and Takeshi Yanagawa)
2018	Super Smash Bros. Ultimate	Arrangements (Note: "How to Play - Super Smash Bros. Melee", "Vs Parasite Queen", "Magicant", "Fourside", "Wood Man Stage", "The Arch-Illager" and "Main theme of FINAL FANTASY VII")
2019	Fantasy Earth Zero	Eight tracks
2020	Higurashi When They Cry Mei	Battle music
2020	Another Eden	Music with Shinji Tamura (Note: Composed "Battles in Another World" and Arranged "Take Up the Cross" and "Daring Sword")
2021	Mario Golf: Super Rush	Music
2021	Tales of Arise	Music
2022	Valkyrie Elysium	Music
2022	Star Ocean: The Divine Force	Music
2023	One Piece Odyssey	Music
2023	Star Ocean: The Second Story R	Arrangements
2024	Eiyuden Chronicle: Hundred Heroes	Music with Michiko Naruke
2025	Absolum	"The Cosmic Beast"
2026	Mario Tennis Fever	Music
2026	SacriFire	Music with G4F Records
TBA	Fallen Fates	Music

=== Anime / television / film ===
List of anime, television shows, and films scored
Year	Title	Role(s)
2000	Gensomaden Saiyuki	Music
2001	Star Ocean EX	Music
2001	Saiyuki: Requiem	Music
2002	Atashin'chi	Music
2002	Weiß Kreuz Glühen	Music
2003	Pluster World	Music
2008	Tales of the Abyss	Music
2014	Tales of Zestiria: Dawn of the Shepherd	Music with Go Shiina
2016	Tales of Zestiria the X	Music with Go Shiina

=== Studio albums ===
List of studio albums
Year	Album
1991	Gikyokuonsou
2008	Forest of Glass
2011	After All...
2013	What's Up?
2013	Passage
