= Princess Daisy =

Video game character

- Mario character
- Promotional art by Shigehisa Nakaue (2021)
- First game: Super Mario Land (1989)
- Voiced by: Kate Fleming (2000, Mario Tennis); Jen Taylor (2000–2003) (Note: Mario Party 3, 4 and 5); Deanna Mustard (2003–2022); Giselle Fernandez (2023–present); Noriko Hidaka (1993, Japanese DVD dub of Super Mario Bros. film); Maya Okamoto (1993, Japanese Nippon TV dub of Super Mario Bros. film); Melissa Beckford (1993, Super Mario Compact Disco CD)
- Portrayed by: Samantha Mathis (1993, Super Mario Bros. film)

In-universe information
- Home: Sarasaland

Princess Daisy (Japanese: デイジー姫, Hepburn: Deijī-hime) is a character in the Mario franchise. She debuted in the 1989 Game Boy launch game Super Mario Land as the ruler of Sarasaland where she was given the role of damsel in distress for Mario to rescue. Depicted as an energetic tomboy, she is often shown to be Luigi's love interest, similarly to Princess Peach being the love interest of Mario, as well as the best friend of Peach. Since her appearance in Mario Tennis, she has been a staple playable character in Mario spin-off games, including Mario Party and Mario Kart. She also appears as a playable character in Super Smash Bros. Ultimate. Daisy was voiced by American voice actress Deanna Mustard from 2003 to 2022, who was succeeded by Giselle Fernandez starting with Super Mario Bros. Wonder. She is portrayed by Samantha Mathis in the live-action Super Mario Bros. film.

Princess Daisy has been a popular character for her noticeable contrast to Peach and her memorable characterization in games such as the Mario Strikers series. Daisy is characterized as athletic and enjoys playing a variety of sports. Despite her status as royalty, she is often less poised and proper than Peach, frequently standing with her hands on her hips and displaying a hotheaded and competitive nature, particularly in defeat. She also tends to show off when victorious or when trying to get her way, and is more openly vain about her appearance than Peach. Though the character had largely been exclusive to spin-off titles since 2000, she was later reintegrated into the mainline Super Mario series of video games as a playable character in Super Mario Run and Super Mario Bros. Wonder.

== Concept and creation ==
Princess Daisy was created as a damsel in distress for Mario to rescue in Super Mario Land. It was produced as a launch title for the Game Boy handheld game console by Gunpei Yokoi in partnership with Satoru Okada without the input of Shigeru Miyamoto. With the aim to create a scaled-down game based on the gameplay of the 1985 Super Mario Bros., it moved away from the usual setting of the Mushroom Kingdom. The development team created Sarasaland, named after a type of floral design, and made Daisy to match that concept.

Daisy's flower emblem is used to represent her in many games.

Daisy was added to Mario Tennis for the Nintendo 64 due to the developer Camelot Software Planning wanting someone whose body shape was appropriate for real-life sports. Daisy's appearance in Super Mario Bros. Wonder came about due to the game's director, Shiro Mouri, noticing that his two daughters often fought over who got to play as Princess Peach, so he wanted to resolve that and also please Mario fans. In various Mario games, she has been voiced by a variety of different individuals, including Deanna Mustard from 2003 to 2022 and Giselle Fernandez since 2023.

== Appearances ==
=== In video games ===
First appearing in the 1989 video game Super Mario Land, Daisy is the princess of Sarasaland, a world outside of the series' usual setting of the Mushroom Kingdom, and is rescued by Mario from the alien Tatanga. In 1991, she had a smaller appearance in NES Open Tournament Golf as Luigi's caddie. In 2000, Daisy appeared as a playable character in Mario Tennis. Since then, Daisy is regularly a playable character in Mario sports games, usually wearing a sleeveless shirt and shorts in the colors of her princess gown.

In 2000, she was introduced as a playable character in the Mario Party series beginning with Mario Party 3. She is also playable in Mario Kart games, first appearing in Mario Kart: Double Dash!!, where her course is known as Daisy Cruiser. This game is also notable for the origins of the phrase “Hi! I’m Daisy!” which Daisy shouts whenever she switches from driver to passenger or says “Yee-haw! Hi! I’m Daisy!” when finishing first in a race or winning a battle. Despite “Hi! I’m Daisy!” only being frequently heard in this game, not making any other appearances outside of skippable cutscenes in the awards ceremony in the first three Mario and Sonic at the Olympic Games titles, it has become strongly associated with her ever since. Mario Kart Wii also added Baby Daisy, her toddler version, which has since appeared in multiple games. Other playable appearances have included Super Mario Run, Fortune Street, and Super Mario Bros. Wonder. She was added to Super Smash Bros. Ultimate as a playable character, after previously appearing as a trophy. Her gameplay in Ultimate is largely identical to that of Princess Peach.

Daisy appears as a skin in multiple video games, including Super Mario Maker and Minecraft. Daisy's Amiibo figurine for the Super Mario franchise was released on November 4, 2016, to coincide with the release of Mario Party: Star Rush. Meanwhile, her Amiibo figurine related to the Super Smash Bros. franchise was released on February 13, 2019. Daisy was added to Dr. Mario World in a post-launch update in 2019. In 2022, she was also added as a post-launch downloadable character to Mario Strikers: Battle League.

=== In other media ===
Daisy is one of the main characters of the 1993 Super Mario Bros. film, loosely based on the games, portrayed by Samantha Mathis. She is a student of archaeology at New York University with whom Luigi falls in love. Daisy is kidnapped by two henchmen of President Koopa, the dictator of Dinohattan, who wants to merge his world and the human world, necessitating Mario and Luigi to save her.

Super Nintendo World, an immersive area at various Universal parks, includes an interactive "Power-Up Band" featuring a design based on her dress.

Princess Daisy makes her feature film debut in the post-credits scene of the 2026 film The Super Mario Galaxy Movie, where she knocks out a thieving Ukiki in the Gateway Galaxy.

== Reception ==
Daisy has received generally positive reception. Critics noted the similarities between Peach and Daisy, such as Destructoid writer Chad Concelmo and Siliconera writer Jenni Lada. Lada felt that Mario Tennis Aces successfully gave Daisy a distinctive personality, stating that she was more energetic whereas Peach was reserved and stylish. She felt that Daisy's characterization was an improvement on Peach due to being more athletic and emotional.

Daisy's inclusion as a playable character in Super Smash Bros. Ultimate was highly anticipated by CJ Andriessen of Destructoid, who described her as the "best princess" and considered her to be one of the most requested characters for the Smash roster. Syfy writer Mason Brady considered Daisy's introduction in the Super Smash Bros. series disappointing due to being a near copy of Peach, describing it as a "blatant lack of originality."

When the base roster for Mario Strikers: Battle League was revealed, several fans expressed disappointment and anger that Daisy was excluded. Neal Ronaghan of Nintendo World Report felt that she was a beloved character in the Strikers series, bemoaning her absence. VentureBeat considered starting a Change.org petition for her to be included, commenting that she had stood out in Super Mario Strikers for her "sassy attitude" and celebration pose that involves turning her back to the camera. Ari Notis of Kotaku echoed fan excitement when she was added to the game in a DLC update and thought that her exclusion had been indicative of a wider problem with the game's limited content. Hope Bellingham writing for GamesRadar+ expressed excitement that Daisy was finally getting recognition from Nintendo by making her a playable character in Super Mario Bros. Wonder and noted that although it was not technically the first time she had been playable, it was a "momentous occasion" for fans.
