= Camelot Software Planning =

Japanese video game developer

Camelot Co., Ltd.
- Trade name: Camelot! Software Planning
- Native name: 株式会社キャメロット
- Romanized name: Kabushiki gaisha Kyamerotto
- Type: Kabushiki gaisha
- Industry: Video games
- Founded: April 4, 1994; 32 years ago (As Camelot Co., Ltd.)
- Founder: Shugo Takahashi
- Headquarters: Shinjuku, Tokyo, Japan
- Key people: Hiroyuki Takahashi (president); Shugo Takahashi (vice president); Motoi Sakuraba
- Products: Shining series; Beyond the Beyond; Everybody's Golf; Golden Sun series; Mario sports games
- Number of employees: 40 (as of April 2025)
- Website: www.camelot.co.jp/wp/

Camelot Co., Ltd. (Note: Japanese: 株式会社キャメロット, Hepburn: Kabushiki-gaisha Kyamerotto) (doing business as Camelot! Software Planning) is a Japanese video game development company established in 1994 and headquartered in Shinjuku, Tokyo. It is known for developing sports games, particularly within Nintendo's Mario franchise, as well as the RPG series Golden Sun.

== History ==
Camelot was founded on April 4, 1994 by Shugo Takahashi, the brother of producer Hiroyuki Takahashi, with the intention of developing games for Sony's PlayStation. They developed their first game, Beyond the Beyond, while providing assistance to Sonic! Software Planning on Shining Wisdom. They would then provide assistance on Sonic's next game, Shining the Holy Ark.

In April 1998, after Sega merged its investment in Sonic into its subsidiary Nextech, Hiroyuki Takahashi joined Camelot as its president. Camelot then finished development of Shining Force III in Sonic's place and moved on to develop titles for Nintendo consoles.

The studio has developed many Mario sports games, including Mario Golf, and Mario Tennis, as well as the Golden Sun series of role-playing games.

The creation of the Mario character Waluigi can be attributed to Camelot, after Mario creator Shigeru Miyamoto consulted with them to create a "Wario-like" counterpart for Luigi during the development of Mario Tennis.

== Credited games ==
List of video games credited to Camelot Co., Ltd. (Note: All titles prior to Shining Wisdom were produced by either Hiroyuki or Shugo Takahashi, as well as being developed by Sonic! Software Planning with the exception of Shining in the Darkness. Camelot Co., Ltd. claims involvement in the development of these titles.)
Year	Title	Publisher	Platform(s)
1991	Shining in the Darkness	Sega	Sega Genesis
1992	Shining Force	Sega	Sega Genesis
1992	Shining Force Gaiden	Sega	Game Gear
1993	Shining Force: The Sword of Hajya	Sega	Game Gear
1993	Shining Force II	Sega	Sega Genesis
1994	Shining Force CD	Sega	Sega CD
1995	Shining Force Gaiden: Final Conflict	Sega	Game Gear

List of video games developed by Camelot! Software Planning
Year	Title	Publisher	Platform(s)
1995	Shining Wisdom	Sega	Sega Saturn
1995	Beyond the Beyond	Sony Computer Entertainment	PlayStation
1996	Shining the Holy Ark	Sega	Sega Saturn
1997	Everybody's Golf	Sony Computer Entertainment	PlayStation
1997	Shining Force III Scenario 1	Sega	Sega Saturn
1998	Shining Force III Scenario 2	Sega	Sega Saturn
1998	Shining Force III Scenario 3	Sega	Sega Saturn
1999	Mario Golf	Nintendo	Nintendo 64
1999	Mario Golf	Nintendo	Game Boy Color
2000	Mario Tennis	Nintendo	Nintendo 64
2000	Mario Tennis	Nintendo	Game Boy Color
2001	Mobile Golf	Nintendo	Game Boy Color
2001	Golden Sun	Nintendo	Game Boy Advance
2002	Golden Sun: The Lost Age	Nintendo	Game Boy Advance
2003	Mario Golf: Toadstool Tour	Nintendo	GameCube
2004	Mario Golf: Advance Tour	Nintendo	Game Boy Advance
2004	Mario Power Tennis	Nintendo	GameCube
2005	Mario Tennis: Power Tour	Nintendo	Game Boy Advance
2007	We Love Golf!	Capcom	Wii
2009	New Play Control! Mario Power Tennis	Nintendo	Wii
2010	Golden Sun: Dark Dawn	Nintendo	Nintendo DS
2012	Mario Tennis Open	Nintendo	Nintendo 3DS
2014	Mario Golf: World Tour	Nintendo	Nintendo 3DS
2015	Mario Tennis: Ultra Smash	Nintendo	Wii U
2017	Mario Sports Superstars	Nintendo	Nintendo 3DS
2018	Mario Tennis Aces	Nintendo	Nintendo Switch
2021	Mario Golf: Super Rush	Nintendo	Nintendo Switch
2026	Mario Tennis Fever	Nintendo	Nintendo Switch 2

=== Cancelled ===
- I Love Golf – (PC)
