= Mario Golf: Super Rush =

2021 video game

- Developer: Camelot Software Planning
- Publisher: Nintendo
- Composer: Motoi Sakuraba
- Series: Mario Golf
- Platform: Nintendo Switch
- Release: June 25, 2021
- Genre: Sports (Golf)
- Modes: Single-player, multiplayer

Mario Golf: Super Rush (Note: マリオゴルフ スーパーラッシュ (Mario Gorufu Sūpā Rasshu)) is a 2021 sports video game developed by Camelot Software Planning and published by Nintendo for the Nintendo Switch. It was announced via a Nintendo Direct on February 17, 2021, and was released worldwide on June 25th the same year. It is the sixth installment in the Mario Golf series following Mario Golf: World Tour in 2014 and is part of the larger Mario franchise. The game features various characters from the Mario franchise competing in golf, with regular competition and other modes.

Super Rush received mixed reviews from critics. Praise was directed towards the game's gameplay mechanics, new modes, controls and visuals, while criticism was aimed at the game's low amount of content at launch and the adventure mode's short length.

== Gameplay ==
Mario hitting a golf ball in traditional stroke play. The interface (clockwise from top left) displays hole information, player stats, clubs, the “Shot Gauge”, shot distance, and a mini-map of the current hole.

The fundamental gameplay of Mario Golf: Super Rush is comparable to previous entries in the Mario Golf series. Through traditional golf rules, the player's primary objective is to get the ball into each hole with the fewest possible number of strokes, using the various golf clubs available to them. The player who completes the game with the lowest number of strokes is the winner of the match in the context of competition. Multiple tools are available to players for strategic benefit, such as the "Shot Gauge" showing the direction and the curve of the ball against slopes and the scan feature, which allows the player to better assess the elevation of terrain. The game offers both conventional button controls for taking shots and motion controls to simulate hitting the ball with a swing.

Each character in the game's roster has a unique Special Shot ability to take advantage of. A Special Shot is charged up over the course of a match and once activated gives every club a higher shot power and a unique ball gimmick that's designed to disrupt an opponent. For example, Luigi's ball has the ability to freeze the ground. The Special Shot can be toggled off or on before a match

Speed Golf, a newly introduced mode for the Mario Golf series, has players race to complete courses in the fastest time, rather than with the fewest strokes. After each swing, players must run across the course toward their ball to take their next shot, dealing with other players and obstacles along the way.

A second new mode called Battle Golf also makes its debut. The mode takes place on a special course with nine holes and similarly to Speed Golf has players race to sink their ball into three of the holes as quickly as possible.

A third new mode called Target Golf was introduced later via a post-launch update. In Target Golf the goal is to have the most points after five shots have been made by the player/players. There are three targets with four scoring zones in each and a player can score more points the closer their ball ends up to a target. When a zone is scored it can't be used to add more score and when a player hits the last zone in a target the player who made the shot gains additional points towards their final tally. During play special balls can replace every players ball, with each special ball having different kinds of effects such as scoring more points in a zone or changing how the ball itself will land. The Special Shot abilities can not be used whatsoever in this mode.

The game features a story mode titled "Golf Adventure" that includes role-playing game elements like gaining experience and stat progression. Players control their own customizable Mii as they become students in a country club, train, and face-off against competition from the Mushroom Kingdom.

Players have the option to compete in a competitive online space as well, called a Ranked Match. These competitive matches place players against other players from around the world, based on their current ranking. Each Ranked Match includes three holes from one of the game's courses, where the player with the best score wins. To advance in ranking, a player must complete multiple online Ranked Matches, with wins earning more points than losses.

== Development ==
Mario Golf Aces was considered as a possible name for the game, similar to Mario Tennis Aces, but Super Rush was chosen because the developers felt it better highlighted the "spirit and speed" of the new Speed Golf and Battle Golf modes of the game.

The idea for Speed Golf came from Hiroyuki and Shugo Takahashi noticing how "There's usually no movement in golf games" and thinking about how "Playing a golf game where all you do is take shots makes sense, but for golf fans… There are definitely other enjoyable aspects of the sport too". They wanted to show players of Mario Golf games "the interesting aspects of the sport" and considered that moving across courses in Speed Golf could be an interesting mechanic, comparing it to moving and jumping as Mario in Super Mario Bros. levels. The developers made sure to include the classic Standard Golf as an option in addition to the newly added modes in the game "for fans who enjoyed the regular golfing aspect of the series".

When conceptualizing how to include Special Shots in the game, the developers found that "Golf is a solo sport in the sense that your actions don't directly impact other players" and therefore reached the idea to create "a shot that would directly impact other players' balls in a mode that everyone can play together", which became Speed Golf and Battle Golf. For Battle Golf, the developers looked to create an "esports-like mode" and originally was less streamlined, when finished they wanted to "showcase the fun by adding it to the opening".

The power gauge's change from horizontal to vertical without impact controls was primarily made due to Speed Golf, where the developers considered that "Continuing the pattern of pick a shot route, decide on a club and pick a direction, before finally hitting the ball didn't really line up with the new game mode". They thought the change was needed for "such a dynamic new game mode". After testing it the developers liked the result and considered it "still really felt like golf". With the overhauled power gauge they also "aimed to create a system that explicitly displays the bend and deviation in a shot caused by an incline, so that the player can get a true sense of golf without having to know the timing of impact".

In regards to the Swing Mode of the game, the developers sought to balance the game from recognizing small and big motions and looked to make it realistic but not restrictive. Nintendo asked Camelot to introduce the "Rookie Course" to the game, which Camelot considered good as it "condenses everything that's fun about golf games". The developers wanted to include each consecutive hole continuously and seamlessly without loading screens since Mario Golf for the Nintendo 64, but the available technology couldn't allow it until Super Rush.

Nintendo did not impose any restrictions on Camelot for the story mode of the game, and they were free to create the story they wanted. Regarding the story of the game, it turned different from what they originally envisioned and Hiroyuki Takahashi claimed that Camelot's writers "got sick of writing the same story RPG modes in previous Mario Golf and Mario Tennis games where you raise a character who had their sights set on winning a tournament".

== Release ==
Mario Golf: Super Rush was developed by Camelot Software Planning and published by Nintendo; the game was announced during a Nintendo Direct on February 17, 2021, and it was released worldwide on June 25 of the same year.

The people that pre-ordered the game received an exclusive pin set. Though not detailed in the initial game announcement, fans spotted that King Bob-omb, a boss that originally appeared in Super Mario 64, was accidentally mentioned by Nintendo to be a playable character on the official game page before being amended. King Bob-omb's inclusion was later officially revealed in an overview trailer alongside Pauline, Chargin' Chuck, and others.

== Reception ==
Reception

Aggregate scores
Aggregator	Score
Metacritic	70/100
OpenCritic	41% recommend (Note: Based on 106 reviews)

Review scores
Publication	Score
Electronic Gaming Monthly	3/5
Game Informer	8.25/10
GameSpot	7/10
GamesRadar+	2.5/5
IGN	6/10
Jeuxvideo.com	14/20
Nintendo Life	7/10
Nintendo World Report	6.5/10
PCMag	4/5
The Guardian	3/5
VG247	3/5

Mario Golf: Super Rush received "mixed or average reviews" according to review aggregator website Metacritic. Fellow review aggregator OpenCritic assessed that the game received fair approval, being recommended by 42% of critics.

The Speed and Battle Golf modes were praised by critics . The game also received praise for its new gameplay mechanics and the added element of motion controls, the latter considered to be precise, as well as the visuals. It did, however, receive criticism for its lack of content, only launching with a few courses, characters and other features, although Nintendo promised that they will continue supporting the game with more content after launch. The Golf Adventure mode received mixed reactions as well.

Mario Golf: Super Rush was the best-selling retail game during its first week on sale in Japan, with 80,430 physical copies being sold. As of December 31, 2022, the game had sold 2.48 million copies worldwide.

Despite the mixed reviews, the Academy of Interactive Arts & Sciences awarded Mario Golf: Super Rush with "Sports Game of the Year" during the 25th Annual D.I.C.E. Awards.
