= Mario Power Tennis =

2004 video game

- North American GameCube box art
- Developer: Camelot Software Planning
- Publisher: Nintendo
- Director: Haruki Kodera
- Producers: Shinji Hatano; Hiroyuki Takahashi; Shugo Takahashi
- Designers: Hiroyuki Takahashi; Shugo Takahashi
- Composer: Motoi Sakuraba
- Series: Mario Tennis
- Platforms: GameCube, Wii
- Release: GameCube: JP: October 28, 2004; NA: November 8, 2004; PAL: February 25, 2005; Wii: JP: January 15, 2009; EU: March 6, 2009; NA: March 9, 2009; AU: March 26, 2009
- Genre: Sports (Tennis)
- Modes: Single-player, multiplayer

Mario Power Tennis (Note: known in Japan as Mario Tennis GC (マリオテニスGC, Mario Tenisu Jī Shī)) is a 2004 sports video game developed by Camelot Software Planning and published by Nintendo for the GameCube. It is the sequel to the Nintendo 64 title Mario Tennis, and is the third installment of the Mario Tennis series. The game was ported for the Wii in 2009 as part of the New Play Control! series, and was also re-released as a Nintendo Selects title in 2012. A companion handheld game, Mario Tennis: Power Tour, was also released on Game Boy Advance around the same time as the original GameCube release, bearing the same title as Power Tennis in Europe.

Power Tennis incorporates multiple characters, themes, and locations from the Mario series. The game includes standard tennis matches, but contains variants that feature different scoring formats and objectives. Other variants include "Gimmick" courts, thematic areas with components and properties that directly affect gameplay. The game has 18 playable characters, each categorised by their style of play and each with a pair of unique moves known as "Power Shots". Power Tennis was developed simultaneously with Mario Golf: Toadstool Tour, and the pair shared similar technology and concepts with each other during production. Such similarities include an emphasis on the Mario theme in characters and settings as well as alternative game modes such as "Ring Shot".

The GameCube version was positively received in general, attaining an aggregate score of 81 percent from GameRankings and 80 out of 100 from Metacritic. Critics praised the game's depth and variety, but criticised the Power Shot animations, which could not be skipped. The Wii version in contrast received a more mixed reaction, with praise for the graphics and multiplayer but criticism for its inaccurate motion controls. In 2010, it was included as one of the games in the book 1001 Video Games You Must Play Before You Die.

== Gameplay ==
Petey Piranha in the Tic-Tac-Glow Special Game

Mario Power Tennis includes variations of tennis matches consisting of characters, courts, and scenarios based on the Mario series. The range of courts includes the standard three types of tennis court, but consists predominantly of those themed upon games in the Mario series, known as "Gimmick" courts. As well as adopting the style aesthetically, these feature thematic elements that influence how the match will be played on that surface, such as the ghosts in the Luigi's Mansion court, which hinder movement when the character comes into physical contact with them. Although standard tennis is available, variants of the sport can be played which adopt different rules and methods of victory. "Ring Shot" involves the player earning points by hitting the ball through rings of varying sizes, with the number of points dependent on the difficulty of the shot. The player acquires the points whenever a winning shot is made adhering to standard rules; the match is won once the predetermined number of points is equaled or surpassed. A similar mode, "Item Battle", involves the characters using items based on the Mario universe to interfere with each other's game and gain an advantage. The central mode of the game is "Tournament Mode", which comprises a set of events with accumulating difficulty. This set of events must be finished successfully to unlock playable characters. This mode can be completed either in "doubles" or "singles", and is divided into Gimmick courts and standard courts. An alternative to these are "Special Games", which involve the player trying to meet a tennis-related objective on a Gimmick court. These Special Games come in multiple forms, incorporating themes from past Nintendo games, such as "Tic-Tac-Glow", which requires the player to hit balls of water to liberate Shine Sprites trapped in dirt, a reference to Super Mario Sunshine. Power Tennis supports the option for four-player multiplayer, which can be accessed during "Exhibition Mode", the standard mode of play where the player can choose his or her opponents and the conditions of the match. Such options include the difficulty of the opponent, the court used, and the number of games and sets required to win the match.

Power Tennis features 18 playable characters, all of whom derive from the Mario franchise. Many characters, such as Wario, had already appeared in the game's predecessor and several other Mario spin-offs, while this was the first appearance for Wiggler as a playable character. All of the characters are categorised into six groups that reflect their playing style: all-around, technical, power, speed, defensive, and tricky. Inherent in each character is a set of two unique moves known as "Power Shots". These powerful moves, which are accompanied with an animation each time they are triggered, incorporate the character's specific qualities. They can only be triggered occasionally in the match, but will usually result in defending or scoring a point, depending on the type of shot chosen. Generic tennis moves, such as slices, dropshots, and lobs, can be applied at any time in the match.

== Development ==
Power Tennis was developed by Camelot Software Planning, with a team of approximately 30 people, headed by brothers Hiroyuki and Shugo Takahashi. The game was first unveiled in a 2002 issue of the Japanese magazine Famitsu, and was later presented at the E3 conference of 2004. Before release, the brothers discussed multiple developmental processes in an interview with Famitsu. Camelot had been working on a previous GameCube version of Mario Tennis, but discontinued the project and began again using ideas and technology from Mario Golf: Toadstool Tour, which was being developed simultaneously with the game. Shugo noted that the original would have been more serious and contained deeper gameplay, but with fewer "Mario-esque" gimmicks. There was also a willingness not to update the graphics only without exploring advancements to concepts and gameplay, which Hiroyuki stated would be "unacceptable for a Mario game". Due to the success of its predecessor, the brothers felt pressure to make a game that was original and would not appear too similar to its predecessor on first sight.

Following release, IGN interviewed Hiroyuki regarding the development of the game. He revealed that Camelot had received co-operation from Nintendo in relation to voice acting and animation, which Takahashi stated as "contributing quite a bit to the improvement of the game's graphics". Takahashi proceeded to explain why the role-playing game elements that were present in Mario Tennis were excluded from Power Tennis, stating that he felt they were more suitable for the "deep single-player experience" present in portable consoles. Regarding the themed courts in the game, he explained that the concepts were conceived during long brainstorming sessions, with courts selected that would both remind gamers of older Mario games and introduce new gamers to Mario games they may not have played. When questioned regarding difficulties in developing the game, Takahashi noted the effort used in making the opening sequences, developing the Special Games, and animations, which caused problems with meeting the schedule. Although there was speculation about online capabilities before release, Takahashi refrained from making the game online-compatible due to fear of lagging problems, stating "I don't think you can play a tennis game online under the current Internet environment and feel satisfied".

A new character proposed to debut in Power Tennis was an evil counterpart to Princess Peach named Warupīchi (ワルピーチ), variously romanized as Walupeach and Wapeach, in the same vein as Wario and Waluigi. She was first conceptualized in name alone during development of Mario Tennis but rejected before a visual design was finalized. Waluigi's designer Fumihide Aoki repurposed the name to create concept sketches for Power Tennis that were not publicized until 2023. She was ultimately rejected again, which Aoki believed was due to there being no characters to pair her with.

Nintendo collaborated with the Lawn Tennis Association in 2005 to promote Power Tennis in the United Kingdom. The promotion featured on-site sampling and official Nintendo branding at various tennis events such as Wimbledon. The LTA's ACE Magazine advertised Power Tennis and featured competitions offering the game as a prize. Nintendo also released an online questionnaire regarding players' habits and preferences in relation to tennis as a part of their Who Are You? campaign.

Nintendo announced in 2008 that they would be re-releasing the title as part of their New Play Control! selection, which feature added Wii controls. The game can be controlled using the Wii Remote and optional Nunchuk attachment, allowing the player to trigger actions such as forehands and backhands by swinging the Remote like a tennis racket. It was released on January 15, 2009, in Japan and in March 2009 in other countries. This version of the game served as inspiration for the Swing Mode introduced in Mario Tennis Aces, which was created as an attempt to improve on its inaccurate motion controls. The developers acknowledged the flaws and limitations of the motion controls in this version by stating that they "couldn't really differentiate the shots" and ended up being "far from what [they] wanted", and called the new Swing Mode "revenge" for the attempt.

== Reception ==
Reception

Aggregate scores
Aggregator	Score	
Aggregator	GameCube	Wii
GameRankings	81.03%	68.19%
Metacritic	80/100	65/100

Review scores
Publication	Score	
Publication	GameCube	Wii
Edge	5/10	N/A
Electronic Gaming Monthly	8.17/10	N/A
Eurogamer	8/10	6/10
Famitsu	34/40	N/A
Game Informer	8.5/10	8.25/10
GamePro	4/5	2.5/5
GameRevolution	B+	B+
GameSpot	8.9/10	N/A
GameSpy	4/5	N/A
IGN	8.5/10	5.8/10
Nintendo Power	3.7/5	N/A
The Sydney Morning Herald	4/5	N/A

The GameCube version of Mario Power Tennis enjoyed a generally positive reception, with reviewers complimenting the variety of play and multiple minigames available. GameSpot named it 2004's "Best Alternative Sports Game" across all platforms. GameSpy's Raymond Padilla lauded the game's use of characters and the player categories, stating "When you put it all together, you have a broad cast of characters, each of whom offers a different feel." Despite this, the Gimmick courts were labeled by Matt Casamassina as a "distraction" and "annoyance", although he acknowledged that some courts were better than others. Additionally, Nintendo World Report's Michael Cole thought that most players would revert to standard courts "after being 'unfairly defeated' by ghosts, paint, or some other trap." Eurogamer's Tom Bramwell welcomed Power Tennis's style, which he said emphasized gameplay over simulation and realism. When comparing the game to its predecessor, reviewers praised Power Tennis for its incorporation of the Mario franchise in the different scenarios and courts.

The gameplay features introduced to the game received a mixed response. IGN noted that the Special Games varied in quality between different games, with Casamassina commenting that "they certainly don't make or break the experience." The game's "Power Shots" was also met with an ambivalent reaction—the shot themselves were praised for adding strategy and character, although GameSpot's Ryan Davis commented that "it would have been nice if you could just skip past the animations and keep the wild moves." In general, the game's multiplayer modes were more popular than single-player, with the "predictable and basic" artificial intelligence contributing to a low difficulty level at times. GameSpy noted how the number of options and variables enhanced the multiplayer experience, and commented that "The game is very good on its own, but it excels when you bring friends into the mix." The mechanics of the tennis gameplay were also popular, with reviewers lauding the game's accessibility as well as its depth relating to the variety of shots available and how the position of the character affects the contact with the ball.

Most critics praised Power Tennis's presentation, with reviewers noting the game's opening sequence especially. Nintendo World Report complimented the level of detail given to the themed locations and character animations, stating that it "[puts] even the Mario Kart series to shame." IGN generally shared this view, although they criticised the background animations, commenting that "The crowds in particular are a repeating blob of the same sprites over and over". On the other hand, the audio received a mediocre response, despite the comical voice acting. Power Tennis sold 139,000 copies during its first week of release in Japan, and sold 377,000 copies altogether in the country from release to December 31, 2006. Power Tennis had sold 296,893 units in North America by January 31, 2005. The game was at fifth position in the Australian GameCube sales charts from October 16 to October 29, 2005. During the 8th Annual Interactive Achievement Awards, Mario Power Tennis received a nomination for "Console Action Sports Game of the Year" by the Academy of Interactive Arts & Sciences.

In spite of the mostly positive reception the GameCube version held, the reception for the Wii remake was mixed. It holds an average score of 65/100 and 68.19% at Metacritic and GameRankings respectively. While it has been praised for the original game's graphics holding up to current Wii games, many editors have found fault in the controls. IGN editor Mark Bozon criticized its motion controls, describing them as imprecise, for ruining a "great game". X-Play editor Dana Vinson similarly disliked the controls, also describing the act of releasing GameCube titles for the Wii with motion controls as being lazy. GamePro editor Dave Rudden criticized the game for adding multiple moves into Wii Remote motions, commenting that it would have to be "twice as responsive" for it to work. Eurogamer editor Oli Welsh criticized both the inaccurate controls and limited improvements, stating that Wii Sports is a superior alternative. While GameDaily editor Robert Workman criticized the motion controls, he stated that everything else works. He also describes it as being mildly enjoyable with three other friends.

In spite of the negative reception, the Wii version has had some positive reception. While Official Nintendo Magazine UK editor Tom East similarly bemoaned the motion controls, he felt that the multiplayer still held up, as it becomes balanced since the other players would have the same problems with the controls. 1UP.com editor Justin Haywald agreed, stating that while it made single player modes difficult, the game was meant to be played with friends. Game Informer editor Matt Helgeson, however, found the motion controls to be good, commenting that other developers should learn from Nintendo. In spite of this, fellow Game Informer editor Matthew Kato described the controls as being only so-so. GameShark editor Danielle Riendeau, however, described the controls as excellent, though adding that it occasionally misreads her shots. In the first four days of the Wii version's release in Japan, Mario Power Tennis sold 56,000 copies. By January 3, 2010, it had sold 205,070 copies in Japan.
