= Mario Tennis =

2000 video game

- North American Nintendo 64 box art
- Developer: Camelot Software Planning
- Publisher: Nintendo
- Directors: Haruki Kodera (N64); Shugo Takahashi (GBC)
- Producers: Shinji Hatano; Hiroyuki Takahashi; Shigeru Miyamoto; Shugo Takahashi (GBC)
- Designers: Hiroyuki Takahashi; Shugo Takahashi
- Composer: Motoi Sakuraba
- Series: Mario Tennis
- Platforms: Nintendo 64, Game Boy Color
- Release: Nintendo 64: JP: July 21, 2000; NA: August 28, 2000; PAL: November 3, 2000; Game Boy Color: JP: November 1, 2000; NA: January 16, 2001; PAL: February 2, 2001
- Genres: Sports (Tennis), Role-playing
- Modes: Single-player, multiplayer

Mario Tennis (Note: Known in Japan as Mario Tennis 64 (Japanese: マリオテニス64, Hepburn: Mario Tenisu Rokujūyon)) is a sports video game developed by Camelot Software Planning and published in 2000 by Nintendo for the Nintendo 64. Following Mario's Tennis, it is the second game in the Mario Tennis series. The game is known for being the debut game of Luigi's arch-rival, Waluigi, and the re-introduction of Princess Daisy and Birdo.

A companion Game Boy Color version of the game featuring a story mode with role-playing elements also developed by Camelot was published under the same title worldwide and as Mario Tennis GB (Note: Mario Tennis GB (Japanese: マリオテニスＧＢ)) in Japan.

The Nintendo 64 version was re-released on the Wii and Wii U Virtual Console, and on the Nintendo Classics service, in 2010, 2015, and 2021 respectively; the Game Boy Color version was re-released on the Nintendo 3DS Virtual Console in 2014, and on the Nintendo Classics service in 2024.

The game received critical acclaim, with praise for its gameplay, depth, and amount of content. The N64 version was succeeded by Mario Power Tennis for the GameCube while the Game Boy Color version was succeeded by Mario Tennis: Power Tour for the Game Boy Advance.

== Gameplay ==
The game uses a control system that differs from most other video tennis games. Shots are performed by pressing one, or both, of the two main buttons (A or B), which make the ball spin in different ways. Pressing a button twice strikes the tennis shot with more power and spin. Additionally, pressing the two buttons in a different order can result in a different type of shot altogether, such as a lob or drop shot. Both buttons can be pressed at the same time to hit a very powerful smash shot. The longer a button is pressed before contact is made with the ball, the stronger the shot will be. The control system allows players of all levels to become familiar with the mechanics of the game within a very short time, whilst also encouraging advanced players to take advantage of the variety of shots offered to come up with different strategies for winning points. A total of seven types of shot are possible using only the two main buttons of the controller. These gameplay mechanics were later brought to the newer games of the Mario Tennis series. Matches support singles or doubles play.

The Nintendo 64 version includes several gameplay modes. Exhibition allows players to compete in a single basic tennis match. In Tournament mode, players compete in singles or doubles elimination tournaments against computer-controlled opponents, with higher difficulties being unlocked each time a tournament is completed; players can unlock new characters and tennis courts by completing certain tournaments with specific characters. Ring Shot features several game types based around hitting the ball through rings scattered around the court. Piranha Challenge is a single-player challenge mode in which three Piranha Plants randomly spit out balls that the player must return. Bowser Stage is a bonus mode in which the court tilts based on the players' positions, affecting movement, and the ball can be hit through Mario Kart item boxes that release items to disrupt opponents. Most modes support multiplayer for up to two players in singles and up to four players in doubles.

In addition to Exhibition mode, the Game Boy Color version features an exclusive story mode with role-playing game mechanics called Mario Tour. In this mode, players begin as a rookie tennis player at the Royal Tennis Academy, who must build up their skill by leveling up through training and practice matches before entering various tournaments. The aim of this mode is to be crowned champion at the academy, although the second part of the game involves the player competing in a tournament to ultimately face Mario, the best tennis player. The role-playing is playable in singles and doubles (separately), effectively doubling the game's longevity. There are training facilities that can help the player progress. The GBC version also features multiple mini-games, such as controlling Donkey Kong to hit banana targets on a wall within a time limit. Multiplayer for two players is supported via use of the Game Link Cable.

The N64 version of Mario Tennis features 16 playable characters, 10 of which did not appear in the previous Mario Tennis game. Notably, the character Waluigi makes his first appearance in this game, having been created to give Wario a doubles partner. In addition to the player's created character, the GBC version features 25 playable characters, consisting of nine Mario series characters and 16 human characters from the game's story mode.

Through the use of a Nintendo 64 Transfer Pak, players are able to import their characters from the GBC version to the N64 game, retaining the characters' stats. Using these characters, experience points may be earned to transfer back to the GBC version. As the characters go up in levels, the player may send their improved characters to the N64 version to level up again. Linking the two games also unlocks Yoshi, Wario, Waluigi, Bowser, and their respective mini-games in the GBC version; completing these mini-games and connecting the two games again will in turn unlock up to six new tennis courts in the N64 version. All Transfer Pak functionality was removed from subsequent digital re-releases of both games, though the additional characters and minigames are unlocked by default in the Nintendo Classics release of the GBC version. Other features, such as the Ring Tournament mode in the N64 version and multiplayer functionality in the GBC version, are also omitted from the Virtual Console releases.

== Development ==
At Nintendo's suggestion, Princess Daisy was brought back from obscurity after having only ever appeared in Super Mario Land and NES Open Tournament Golf in order to give Peach a doubles partner like Mario had Luigi. This also led to fans shipping Daisy with Luigi, just like how Nintendo officially shipped Peach with Mario. Camelot asked Nintendo if the game could also feature girlfriends for Wario and Waluigi, but Miyamoto said that he "didn't even want to see their girlfriends."

The Game Boy Color version had a marketing budget of $4 million.

== Reception ==
Reception

Aggregate scores
| Aggregator | Score | | |
| Aggregator | GBC | N64 | Wii |
|---|---|---|---|
| GameRankings | 91% | 87% | N/A |
| Metacritic | N/A | 91/100 | N/A |

Review scores
| Publication | Score | | |
| Publication | GBC | N64 | Wii |
|---|---|---|---|
| AllGame | 4/5 | 4/5 | N/A |
| Consoles + | 92% | 95% | N/A |
| Edge | N/A | 8/10 | N/A |
| Electronic Gaming Monthly | 8.33/10 | 9/10 | N/A |
| Famitsu | 30/40 | 32/40 | N/A |
| Game Informer | 8.75/10 | 8.25/10 | N/A |
| GameFan | N/A | 97% | N/A |
| GamePro | 4.5/5 | N/A | N/A |
| GameSpot | 8/10 | 8.2/10 | N/A |
| GameSpy | 90% | 89% | N/A |
| Hyper | 9/10 | 91/100 | N/A |
| IGN | 9/10 | 9/10 | 8.5/10 |
| Nintendo Life | 8/10 | 8/10 | N/A |
| Nintendo Power | 5/5 | 9.1/10 | N/A |
| Official Nintendo Magazine | N/A | 92% | N/A |
| Video Games (DE) | N/A | 83% | N/A |
| 64 | N/A | 92% | N/A |
| Maxim | N/A | 10/10 | N/A |

Award
| Publication | Award |
|---|---|
| 4th Annual Interactive Achievement Awards | Console Family |

Mario Tennis received critical acclaim, with critics citing the accessibility and depth of the controls as being very impressive. The game physics and amount of content have also been praised. The Nintendo 64 version received "universal acclaim" according to the review aggregation website Metacritic. The game was a runner-up for GameSpot's annual "Best Nintendo 64 Game" award, losing to Perfect Dark. Its Game Boy Color version was nominated for the publication's 2001 "Best Game Boy Color Game" award, which went to Oracle of Seasons and Oracle of Ages.

Dutch magazine Power Unlimited gave the N64 version a score of 9.1 out of 10, calling it very addictive, especially with four players.

Mario Tennis sold over 200,000 copies within two weeks of its release. It became the eighth best selling Game Boy Color game in Japan, with 357,987 copies sold.

During the 4th Annual Interactive Achievement Awards, the Academy of Interactive Arts & Sciences honored Mario Tennis with the "Console Family" award.
