= Mario Tennis: Power Tour =

2005 video game

- North American box art
- Developer: Camelot Software Planning
- Publisher: Nintendo
- Director: Yutaka Yamamoto
- Producers: Shinji Hatano; Hiroyuki Takahashi; Shugo Takahashi
- Designers: Hiroyuki Takahashi; Shugo Takahashi
- Composer: Motoi Sakuraba
- Series: Mario Tennis
- Platform: Game Boy Advance
- Release: JP: September 13, 2005; EU: November 18, 2005; AU: December 1, 2005; NA: December 5, 2005
- Genres: Sports, role-playing
- Modes: Single-player, multiplayer

Mario Tennis: Power Tour, (Note: Known in Japan as Mario Tennis Advance (Japanese: マリオテニスアドバンス, Hepburn: Mario Tenisu Adobansu)) known as Mario Power Tennis in Europe, is a 2005 role-playing sports game developed by Camelot Software Planning and published by Nintendo for the Game Boy Advance. It is the sequel to the Game Boy Color version of Mario Tennis. While it is the handheld companion to Mario Power Tennis, released on GameCube, with the European release sharing its title, Power Tour lacks connectivity with Power Tennis, unlike how its predecessor features connectivity with its console counterpart on Nintendo 64. Power Tour was re-released on the Wii U's Virtual Console in 2014.

The game received positive reviews from critics, with praise towards its gameplay, presentation, amount of content, RPG elements, and story mode. Several critics lauded the game as one of the best Game Boy Advance sports games.

== Gameplay ==
The gameplay of Power Tour is similar to Mario Power Tennis’ gameplay. Players play tennis with other characters, in both doubles and singles, and there are several mechanics such as topspin, slice, and "Power Shots" (Special Shots in the Japanese version). There are both Offensive Power Shots and Defensive Power Shots which are earned further in the game. Offensive Power Shots are very powerful attacks; they power-up the ball and when they make contact with another player, they cause an effect such as being knocked back a little bit, running around dazed, etc. Defensive Power Shots can negate the secondary effects of Offensive Power Shots and they can reach balls which normally would be out of reach. There are topspin and slice, and topspin has more power than slice, while slice exchanges a tiny bit of power for more curve in the character's shot. As well as this, there is also a variety of shots, such as lobs or smashes.

The game features an in-depth story mode with RPG elements where the player characters can explore a Tennis Academy and interact with other characters, learn and practice tennis in a training area, challenge other tennis players to rise in rank, and compete in tournaments. Players can earn experience points from matches and level up to increase their various attributes, where improving those leads to benefits such as more potent shots and increased movement speed in matches. In addition to features present in Mario Tennis for the Game Boy Color, Power Tour adds a new area where players can learn a wide assortment of Power Shots by playing various kinds of minigames with multiple difficulty levels, which also increase a specific parameter related to a Power Shot.

The game additionally features an Exhibition mode where both Mario characters and players of the Tennis Academy can play with or against each other as well as other modes such as an in-depth tennis dictionary with terms related to the sport.

=== Characters ===
There are several characters in Power Tour. The two main characters to choose from are Clay (Max in the European version; Norty in the Japanese version), a male power player, and Ace (Tina in the European version; Tabby in the Japanese version), a female technical player. The player can change the name of the character they choose to play as, and also choose the character's dominant hand for playing tennis (right or left). The character the player did not choose will be their doubles partner and his/her name cannot be changed.

The game features a variety of characters from the Mario Tennis game for Game Boy Color, who return as coaches. One of them is Alex, the male protagonist from the first game. His varsity teammates are featured as coaches at the various levels of play, and there are new faces such as Elroy, Tori, Whisker, and Paula. Playable previous human players are not available.

The game features six characters from the greater Mario franchise: Mario, Luigi, Peach, Donkey Kong, Bowser and Waluigi. They are available from the start in Exhibition mode but do not appear in person in the story mode until the final tournament, although they appear in the introduction and are hinted to be part of a mysterious group appearing at the start of the game. This is the only game where Waluigi appears without Wario.

== Plot ==
The game starts as the main character wakes up in unfamiliar surroundings. Their partner explains that the protagonist has enrolled at the Royal Tennis Academy, and he/she is the character's doubles partner. Having passed out the previous day during the Welcome Workout, they decide to get some breakfast. When they arrive at the restaurant, it is deserted and they find out that masked challengers have challenged the top academy students, including Alex, who is implied to be the top-ranked player at the academy. After hearing that the masked players defeated the school champions, they set out to become the top ranked player, in order to enter the main tournament (The Island Open) and discover the masked players' true identities.

After defeating the Junior and Senior classes, the player advances to the Varsity Level. Learning that only the two highest ranked doubles pairs are guaranteed entry in the tournament, the main character defeats the entire Varsity class. The player, their partner, and two other players named Elroy (Excel in the Japanese version, who is also the varsity captain) and Tori enter the Island Open.

After the winning the Island Open, the players has not yet discovered the identities of the masked players. However, the morning following their win, the two main characters are approached by Alex and led to a secret airport near the academy. Here, they meet Mario, who is implied to have been one of the masked players, and are taken to Peach's Kingdom to participate in the Peach Tournament against the other characters in the game. Winning the tournament ends the doubles game.

Afterwards, the main character becomes the singles champion of the school and wins the Island Open on their own, again traveling to the Mushroom Kingdom to play in the Peach Tournament. Winning this Tournament effectively ends the Story Mode's main plot line, and the main character presumably goes home the hero of the academy.

== Reception ==
Reception

Aggregate scores
Aggregator	Score
GameRankings	80.76%
Metacritic	81/100

Review scores
Publication	Score
Electronic Gaming Monthly	6.67/10
Eurogamer	8/10
Game Informer	7.75/10
GameSpot	8.5/10
GameSpy	4/5
GameZone	9/10
IGN	9/10
NGC Magazine	4/5
Nintendo Power	7/10
Nintendo World Report	10/10
Detroit Free Press	4/4
The Sydney Morning Herald	3.5/5

Power Tour received positive reviews. It currently holds a score of 80.76% at GameRankings and 81 out of 100 at Metacritic. Several critics lauded the game as one of the best Game Boy Advance sports games.

IGN gave the game 9 out of 10, praising the RPG aspects of the game and the leveling system to improve the characters. They did however criticize the lack of connectivity to Mario Power Tennis like Mario Golf: Toadstool Tour and Mario Golf: Advance Tour had. GameSpot gave it 8.5 out of 10, praising the game's selection of options and characters, as well as the power shots and Mario characters, but criticized the game's RPG mode, calling it too "involved". Eurogamer gave it 8 out of 10, stating "as GBA titles go, Mario Power Tennis is a fantastic title to own - not least because it justifies its existence by being the best GBA tennis title by a mile" and calling it "Yet another shining example of the kind of simple, addictive brilliance that Nintendo seems to have a monopoly on these days." GameSpy gave the game four stars out of five, commending the mini-games and single-player mode, but found the "ugly" 3D court models to be poor.

Nintendo World Report gave the game a perfect ten. They praised all aspects of the game and mentioned it does them "magnificently". Its RPG elements were lauded as engaging and well integrated, while its gameplay was applauded for being deep and strategic with an "Excellent AI". In terms of presentation, they considered the visuals to be appealing and “undeniably gorgeous” with detailed expressive animations. They also praised the variety of modes and mini-games as fun and challenging additional content that connects with the story mode and its characters' progression. Their only criticism was the small roster of Mario characters and short time spent in the Mushroom Kingdom at the endgame of the story but felt that the game more than made up for it with everything else and praised its overall charm and polish, ultimately considering it a “rich overall experience” and “one of the best games” on the Game Boy Advance.

In 2023, IGN ranked Power Tour as the 15th best Game Boy Advance game as all time, highlighting how it "features a much more fleshed out single player experience than its predecessor" while adding "more Mario characters and moves".
