= Mario Golf: World Tour =

2014 video game

- Packaging artwork released for all territories
- Developer: Camelot Software Planning
- Publisher: Nintendo
- Director: Shugo Takahashi
- Producers: Hiroyuki Takahashi; Shugo Takahashi; Toshiharu Izuno
- Designers: Hiroyuki Takahashi; Shugo Takahashi; Norisumi Osawa
- Writer: Hiroyuki Takahashi
- Composer: Motoi Sakuraba
- Series: Mario Golf
- Platform: Nintendo 3DS
- Release: JP: May 1, 2014; NA/EU: May 2, 2014; AU: May 3, 2014
- Genre: Sports
- Modes: Single-player, multiplayer

Mario Golf: World Tour (Note: マリオゴルフ ワールドツアー (Mario Gorufu Wārudo Tsuā)) is a 2014 sports video game developed by Camelot Software Planning and published by Nintendo for the Nintendo 3DS. The game was first announced on February 14, 2013, in a Nintendo Direct presentation. It is the fifth game in the series, and is the first one in a decade, since 2004's Mario Golf: Advance Tour for the Game Boy Advance. The game was initially scheduled for the second half of 2013, but was eventually delayed to May 2014.

The game received generally positive reviews from critics, who praised its gameplay, audiovisual presentation, modes, and online features, but criticized its Castle Club story mode for its short length and having Mii characters as the only playable characters.

== Gameplay ==
World Tour is a golf simulation video game with the basic premise mirroring the basis of golf. Controlling characters from the Mario franchise, the player aims to hit a golf ball with a golf club across a golf course in order to hit it into the target hole in the lowest number of strokes. The game in particular employs an arcade-like approach to golf, emphasizing simple, straightforward controls and faster-paced gameplay over realism. Despite this, some courses are modeled to look like real-life courses, while others are Super Mario themed environments. The game continues to employ the gameplay mechanic of "Super Shots"; when chosen by the player, they allow for extra distance when hitting the ball, although only a limited number of them are allocated per course, creating a strategic aspect to their use.

World Tour is the first Mario Golf game with online multiplayer features. The game also contains online golf tournaments, and a feature to find other players to play golf with.

== Reception ==
Reception

Aggregate scores
Aggregator	Score
Metacritic	78/100
OpenCritic	65% recommend

Review scores
Publication	Score
Destructoid	8.5/10
Eurogamer	8/10
GameSpot	7/10
GamesRadar+	4/5
IGN	8.6/10
Nintendo Life	9/10
Nintendo World Report	8/10
Polygon	8.0/10

World Tour has received generally favorable reviews from critics. Many critics praised the gameplay and online functionality, but criticized its Castle Club story mode for its short length and having Mii characters as the only playable characters. The game holds an average score of 78 on Metacritic.

Destructoid gave it an 8.5 saying that the learning curve is steep and praised the online multiplayer, but criticized the camera and aiming control. IGN gave World Tour an 8.6 rating, summarizing "You don't have to be a hardcore golf fan to get hooked on World Tour. It rewards good play, gives plenty to do, and is a great teacher."
