= Super Mario Spikers =

Cancelled video game

- Developer: Next Level Games
- Publisher: Nintendo
- Series: Mario Sports
- Platform: Wii
- Release: Cancelled
- Genre: Sports game
- Modes: Single player, multiplayer

Super Mario Spikers was a planned video game developed by Next Level Games, planned for release on the Wii video game console. The game was worked on in 2006 and 2007, but never formally announced as a title in development until a prototype was leaked in 2014.

== Gameplay ==
The game was described as a hybrid of volleyball and wrestling, with elements of a game show.

== Development ==
Development of the game began in late 2006, shortly after Next Level Games had completed Mario Strikers Charged. As a reward for the success of the prior two Mario Strikers adaptations of the Mario franchise to the world of soccer, and Nintendo's general success with creating sports adaptations with Mario characters, Nintendo financed Next Level Games' efforts to create a pitch for a volleyball game. The title started off as Mario Volleyball, a simple take on Mario characters playing volleyball, similar to Mario Golf or Mario Tennis. Over time, the development team decided to implement elements of wrestling to the game, changing the title to Super Mario Spikers and adding more aggressive gameplay, making it more similar to their two prior Mario soccer games in both title and concept. This decision was inspired by Next Level Games' involvement in also developing a cancelled WWE game prior to Super Mario Strikers.

Nintendo was initially open to the idea, giving the budget to follow through as a reward for the completion of Mario Strikers Charged. However, after Nintendo saw the team's pitch, it was not green-lit due to the level of violence present. A playable prototype was created before development ceased in 2007. An unnamed member of the development team stated that the game clashing with Nintendo's "code of honor" was the reason for its rejection.

== Aftermath and legacy ==
The game went entirely unannounced until information on it was leaked by the video game website "Unseen 64" in September 2014. Only test footage and concept art were ever released from the project. Despite Nintendo passing on the game, Next Level Games would continue to work with Nintendo and their properties, with the team next developing the Wii console's Punch-Out!!, and Luigi's Mansion: Dark Moon.

Video game journalists lamented the game's cancellation. IGN included it on its October 2014 feature of "10 Most Heartbreaking Game Cancellations", likening the game's potential to V'Ball. Kotaku writer Alex Walker featured it in his list of cancelled games Nintendo could revive. GamesRadar felt that it was understandable why Nintendo did not green-light the project, citing an animation where Waluigi stomps on a downed Mario as being exceedingly violent for a Mario game.

== See also ==
- Mario Sports Mix - Nintendo's eventual 2011 venture into volleyball with Mario characters, instead developed by Square Enix
