= Metroid Prime: Federation Force =

2016 video game

- North American box art
- Developer: Next Level Games
- Publisher: Nintendo
- Director: Jason Carr
- Producers: Paul Martin; Rob Davidson; Kensuke Tanabe
- Designer: Devon Blanchet
- Programmer: David Catlin
- Artist: Anthony Iammarino
- Writer: Ryunosuke Suzuki
- Composers: Chad York; Darren Radtke; Mike Peacock
- Series: Metroid
- Platform: Nintendo 3DS
- Release: NA: August 19, 2016; JP: August 25, 2016; EU: September 2, 2016; AU: September 3, 2016
- Genre: First-person shooter
- Modes: Single-player, multiplayer

Metroid Prime: Federation Force is a 2016 cooperative first-person shooter video game developed by Next Level Games and published by Nintendo for the Nintendo 3DS. Taking place after the events of Metroid Prime 3: Corruption (2007), players assume the role of Galactic Federation Marines attempting to thwart the continuing advances of the Space Pirates after Samus Aran eradicated the deadly Phazon mutagen. The gameplay places a greater emphasis on the shooting mechanics and multiplayer, similar to its handheld predecessor Metroid Prime Hunters, albeit with cooperation instead of competition. It also includes a competitive soccer-based game mode known as Metroid Prime: Blast Ball.

Federation Force's announcement at E3 2015 was met with a largely negative reception from fans due to the game bearing little resemblance to previous entries in the Metroid franchise. The game was further derided for its poor timing, as it was a spin-off title that was announced when the series had been on hiatus since the controversial Metroid: Other M (2010) and that the game would release during the series' 30th anniversary. Upon release, the game was a commercial failure and was met with a mixed reception.

== Gameplay ==
Gameplay of Federation Force, with the map shown at the bottom screen

Metroid Prime: Federation Force plays similarly to Metroid Prime Hunters, which primarily focused on the shooting mechanics within the Metroid Prime series as opposed to the exploration. Like its handheld predecessor, Federation Force incorporates cooperative elements into the core gameplay, but it lacks the touch-based controls of Hunters as well as the established scanning mechanics of the Metroid Prime series, which allowed players to analyze their character's surrounding environment and discover secrets.

Federation Force is the first Metroid game where the player controls a Marine of the Galactic Federation. Within the context of the Metroid series, the Galactic Federation is a law-enforcing organization where soldiers are divided into platoons and go on planetary missions, which is how Federation Force's campaign is organized. The game features previously established aliens as enemies, including the titular jellyfish-like Metroids and Space Pirates, but it also features original enemies, such as Goliath Beetles. The environments are diversified, with at least one mission taking place in an icy region, while another takes place in a desert.

Up to four players traverse the planets to meet their objective. Unlike the multiplayer modes within Hunters and Metroid Prime 2: Echoes, players work cooperatively as a single unit as opposed to competing with each other. Before starting a mission, players can customize their Marine with different weapons and utilities. Some are more offensive, like the returning Super Missiles. Others are more strategic, such as a healing first aid device that allows one Marine to hang back and aid his comrades. The different weapons have weight-based properties that affect the player's speed and mobility. These mechanics are inspired by options in classic role-playing games.

=== Blast Ball ===
"Blast Ball" is a mode which offers three-on-three matches, where players in their mecha suits shoot balls into nets akin to both the real life sport soccer and the video game Rocket League. This mode serves as a tutorial for the control scheme and an in-universe exercise for the playable Marines.

This mode was originally unveiled as a separate game under the same name during the Nintendo World Championships and was the first reveal of Metroid Prime: Federation Force in general. This mode was also playable during E3 2015, where Federation Force was announced days later.

"Blast Ball" was released independently as a free download on the Nintendo eShop on July 21, 2016, with a limited online play period. Nintendo of America branded the download as a special demo version of the full game. The mode is also included in the retail title with full online support, and saved progress from the free download can be transferred to the retail version. Online support for the free download was terminated on December 31 the same year. This did not affect the online support for the "Blast Ball" mode in the full version.

== Synopsis ==
=== Setting ===
The events of Metroid Prime: Federation Force take place after Metroid Prime 3: Corruption. Instead of featuring Samus Aran as the protagonist or a playable character, the game focuses on the Galactic Federation's Federation Force, a group of elite marines equipped with gigantic mechanized armorsuits called Mechs modeled after Samus Aran's Power Suit. Players control a young Marine who goes through various parts of training and is eventually sent to carry out research missions.

The Federation Force is assigned to former Galactic Federation territory in the Bermuda System which features three planets: Excelcion, Talvania, and Bion. While conducting missions there, it is discovered that the Space Pirates have regrouped in this area and have obtained an ancient technology that increases their size to gargantuan proportions, which they intend to use against the Galactic Federation. Samus, featured as a secondary character in Metroid Prime: Federation Force, appears to conduct investigations regarding the Space Pirates' presence. Emphasis is made on encountering her from the perspective of the Federation Marines.

=== Plot ===
In an effort to eradicate the Space Pirate menace for good, the Galactic Federation authorizes Operation Golem, a top-secret project in developing Mech suits to better combat the threat. An elite unit in the Federation, known as the Federation Force, is formed to pilot these Mechs, led by General Alex Miles. The Federation Force is sent to the Bermuda System to conduct archaeological surveys.

The Federation Force soon discovers Space Pirate presence in the Bermuda System. The Galactic Federation hires Samus Aran to investigate the Space Pirates and provide intelligence. During an investigation on Bion, the Federation Force learns that the Space Pirates have acquired a technology that increases their size. Meanwhile, Samus discovers that the Space Pirates are building a massive battleship known as the Doomseye. The Federation then abruptly loses contact with Samus.

The Doomseye cannot be located due to sophisticated cloaking technology powered by generators on each of the three planets in the system. The Force destroys the devices and reveals the Doomseye in orbit, which retaliates and decimates the majority of the Federation Fleet before surrounding itself in an impenetrable shield. The Federation Force infiltrates the Doomseye and discovers that the Space Pirates have captured Samus, who is then brainwashed and transformed into gigantic size and forced to fight against the Force. The Force defeats her, returning her size to normal, and disables the Doomseye's force field, allowing the survivors of the Federation Fleet to launch their assault. During the ensuing chaos, the Force is sucked into the vacuum of space before the Fleet destroys the Doomseye, where they are saved by Samus. Samus then thanks the Federation Force for their efforts.

In a post-credits scene, if the Federation Force had successfully stolen a Metroid egg from the Space Pirates, an unseen individual bearing a striking resemblance to Sylux infiltrates a Galactic Federation facility and encounters the Metroid egg. The individual projects a beam onto the egg, causing it to rapidly hatch into larval form.

== Development ==
Federation Force was developed by Next Level Games, who are known for having previously developed Super Mario Strikers, Mario Strikers Charged, Punch-Out!! for Wii, and Luigi's Mansion: Dark Moon. In early 2014, an interview with Next Level Games' co-founder Jason Carr revealed the company's closeness with Nintendo and implied that their future games would be exclusive to Nintendo's consoles. Carr also shared that Nintendo gives them "better and better IP to work with".

Nintendo's subsidiary Retro Studios - who previously developed Metroid Prime, Metroid Prime 2: Echoes, and Metroid Prime 3: Corruption - were not directly involved with Federation Force's development, but they designed the Galactic Federation mechs for the title. It was speculated by some people that Nintendo Software Technology, the development studio behind previous handheld entry Metroid Prime Hunters, may have been involved, but this turned out to be untrue. NST were not even made aware of the title's existence and only learned of Federation Force during the E3 2015 Nintendo Direct.

The producer of Federation Force was Kensuke Tanabe, who produced all previous Metroid Prime titles. He first conceptualized of a game centered around the Galactic Federation while working on Metroid Prime 3: Corruption. He wanted to expand the Metroid universe by showing it from the perspective of the Galactic Federation's Marines. Tanabe also hoped that Federation Force's plot would lead to future Metroid Prime games based on the relationship between Samus and Sylux, with additional involvement from the Federation Marines. In addition to Tanabe, Nintendo's Yoshihito Ikebata and Ryuichi Nakada oversaw the game's development. They originally considered making it for the Nintendo DSi, but ultimately decided to make it for Nintendo 3DS due to Next Level Games' familiarity with the hardware. It was planned to release alongside the New Nintendo 3DS, but development pushed the title's release date to 2016.

While the game is playable on all Nintendo 3DS models, Metroid Prime: Federation Force specifically benefits from the C-Stick of the New Nintendo 3DS by allowing the player to adjust their view of the surrounding environments. This extends to the game also supporting the Circle Pad Pro and Gyro Sensor controls for earlier Nintendo 3DS models. The game also supports Amiibo functionality, with compatible Amiibo unlocking new paint jobs for the Mech that award special gameplay bonuses.

== Reception ==
Reception

Aggregate score
Aggregator	Score
Metacritic	64/100

Review scores
Publication	Score
Destructoid	5.5/10
Electronic Gaming Monthly	3.5/10
Game Informer	7/10
GameRevolution	2.5/5
GameSpot	5/10
IGN	5.9/10
Nintendo Life	8/10
Nintendo World Report	9/10
Polygon	5/10

=== Pre-release ===
Upon its reveal at E3 2015, Metroid Prime: Federation Force received negative reception from many fans of the series. The game was criticized for lacking traditional Metroid series elements and not resembling other Metroid games, with criticism aimed toward the game's focus on first-person shooter combat and multiplayer over exploration and isolation, the lack of a single player mode, the graphics (both the technical aspect and the use of a cartoonish super-deformed art style, which was considered unfitting with the Metroid series' mature tones) and the absence of the series protagonist Samus Aran. Moreover, as the series had been on hiatus for five years since the last released game in the series, Metroid: Other M, the last acclaimed Metroid game, Metroid Prime 3: Corruption, was released eight years prior, and the game's release window coincided with the series' 30th anniversary, fans criticized Nintendo's choice of resuming the franchise after a half-decade of hiatus with a spin-off title rather than a main series Metroid game.

The game became one of the most discussed and controversial games of both that year's E3 and 2015 in general: the debut trailer received over 25,000 dislikes and just 2,500 likes on YouTube within the first day of its announcement, giving it a 90% dislike ratio, and reached 9,500 likes and 83,000 dislikes by the end of that year. A Change.org petition calling for the game's cancellation was also created in the hours following the game's announcement, reaching 7,500 signatures in under 24 hours. Within 2 months this petition went up to 20,000 signatures. It was later announced that the game does have a single player mode and that Samus Aran would appear in-game as a non-playable character. This game would be a defining factor on the negative reception of Nintendo's presence at E3 2015 as whole, fueled by the announcement of Animal Crossing: amiibo Festival and the lack of The Legend of Zelda: Breath of the Wild.

Following a long silence on the game, Tanabe detailed the game further in a March 2016 Nintendo Direct, but an accompanying trailer on YouTube received a 2:1 dislike to like ratio (last recorded as 1,374 to 600) and resulted in Nintendo disabling the feature within hours of being available. Additionally, the game was not present at E3 2016, even though its release was slated for a few months after the event.

=== Post-release ===
Metroid Prime: Federation Force received a rating of 64/100 on the review aggregator website Metacritic, indicating "mixed or average reviews".

=== Sales ===
Upon release in Japan in August 2016, Metroid Prime: Federation Force sold less than 4,000 copies and failed to enter the top 20 of the sales charts. In the United Kingdom, the game debuted outside of the all-format software charts, below older 3DS titles such as New Super Mario Bros. 2 and Tomodachi Life, and charting outside of the top ten on the 3DS charts, leading some outlets to describe the game as a commercial failure.

== Legacy ==
In the 2018 Nintendo Switch game Super Smash Bros. Ultimate, the blue Mech appears as a collectible Spirit, and the title theme can be played in Metroid-inspired levels.
