= Luigi's Mansion (disambiguation) =

Luigi's Mansion is a 2001 adventure game

Luigi's Mansion may also refer to:

- Luigi's Mansion (series), a list of Luigi's Mansion games
  - Luigi's Mansion: Dark Moon, which is also known as Luigi's Mansion 2
  - Luigi's Mansion 3, the third entry of Luigi's Mansion
