= Princess Peach =

Video game character

- Mario character
- Promotional art (2019)
- First game: Super Mario Bros. (1985)
- Created by: Shigeru Miyamoto
- Designed by: Shigeru Miyamoto; Yōichi Kotabe
- Voiced by: English: Jeannie Elias (1989, The Super Mario Bros. Super Show!); Tracey Moore (1990–1991) (Note: The Adventures of Super Mario Bros. 3 and the Super Mario World TV series); Kathy Fitzgerald (1993, Mario Is Missing!); Jocelyn Benford (1994, Hotel Mario); Leslie Swan (1996-1997, 2004, 2007) (Note: Super Mario 64 international and Japanese Shindō editions, Mario Kart 64 international edition, Super Mario 64 DS and Super Paper Mario); Jen Taylor (1999–2007, 2012–2013); Nicole Mills (2005) (Note: Super Mario Strikers and Mario & Luigi: Partners in Time); Samantha Kelly (2007–2024); Anya Taylor-Joy (2023–present, Illumination films); Jessica DiCicco (2023, The Super Mario Bros. Movie; Baby Peach only); Courtney Lin (2025–present); Japanese: Hiroko Taniyama (1993, "Go Go Mario!!" CD); Mami Yamase (1986, Super Mario Bros.: The Great Mission to Rescue Princess Peach!); Miyako Endō (1989, Amada Anime Series: Super Mario Bros.); Maria Kawamura (1990, Super Mario Bros. Special Drama CD); Mariko Mukai (1996–1998) (Note: BS Super Mario USA, Excitebike: Bun Bun Mario Battle Stadium and BS Super Mario Collection, all via Satellaview broadcasting only); Asako Kozuki (1996–2001) (Note: Mario Kart 64 Japanese edition, Excitebike: Bun Bun Battle Stadium in-game, Mario Party, Mario Party 2 and Mario Kart: Super Circuit); Arisa Shida (2023–present, Illumination films)

In-universe information
- Family: Rosalina (sister; Illumination films only)

Princess Peach Toadstool (Japanese: ピーチ姫, Hepburn: Pīchi-hime; pronounced [piːtɕi̥ çime]) is a character in Nintendo's Mario franchise. She was created by Shigeru Miyamoto and introduced in the 1985 original Super Mario Bros. game as Princess Toadstool. She is the princess regnant and head of state of the Mushroom Kingdom, where she resides in her castle along with Toads. Since her debut, she has appeared in the majority of Mario video games as the main female character and the romantic interest of Mario.

As the lead female character in the main Super Mario series, Peach's role is typically the damsel in distress who is kidnapped by the series antagonist, Bowser. In most of the games, her role is to be a captive until she is eventually rescued by Mario. In several later games of the series, such as Super Mario 3D World, Super Mario Run, and Super Mario Bros. Wonder, she is a playable character. Outside the series, she has appeared as the protagonist and player character of several video games, including Princess Toadstool's Castle Run, Super Princess Peach, and Princess Peach: Showtime!. She also makes regular appearances as a playable character in Mario spin-offs and other video game series, including Mario Sports games, Mario Kart, Mario Party, Paper Mario, and the fighting game series Super Smash Bros.

Peach is one of the best-known female protagonists in video game history, having appeared in more video game titles than any other female character. She has also appeared in official merchandise, comics, and animated series. In The Super Mario Bros. Movie (2023) and The Super Mario Galaxy Movie (2026), she is voiced by Anya Taylor-Joy. Peach has received a mixed reception, with much commentary being critical of her longstanding repetitive role as a princess waiting to be rescued. She has been described by critics as one of the most iconic and influential female video game characters.

== Concept and creation ==
=== Characterization ===
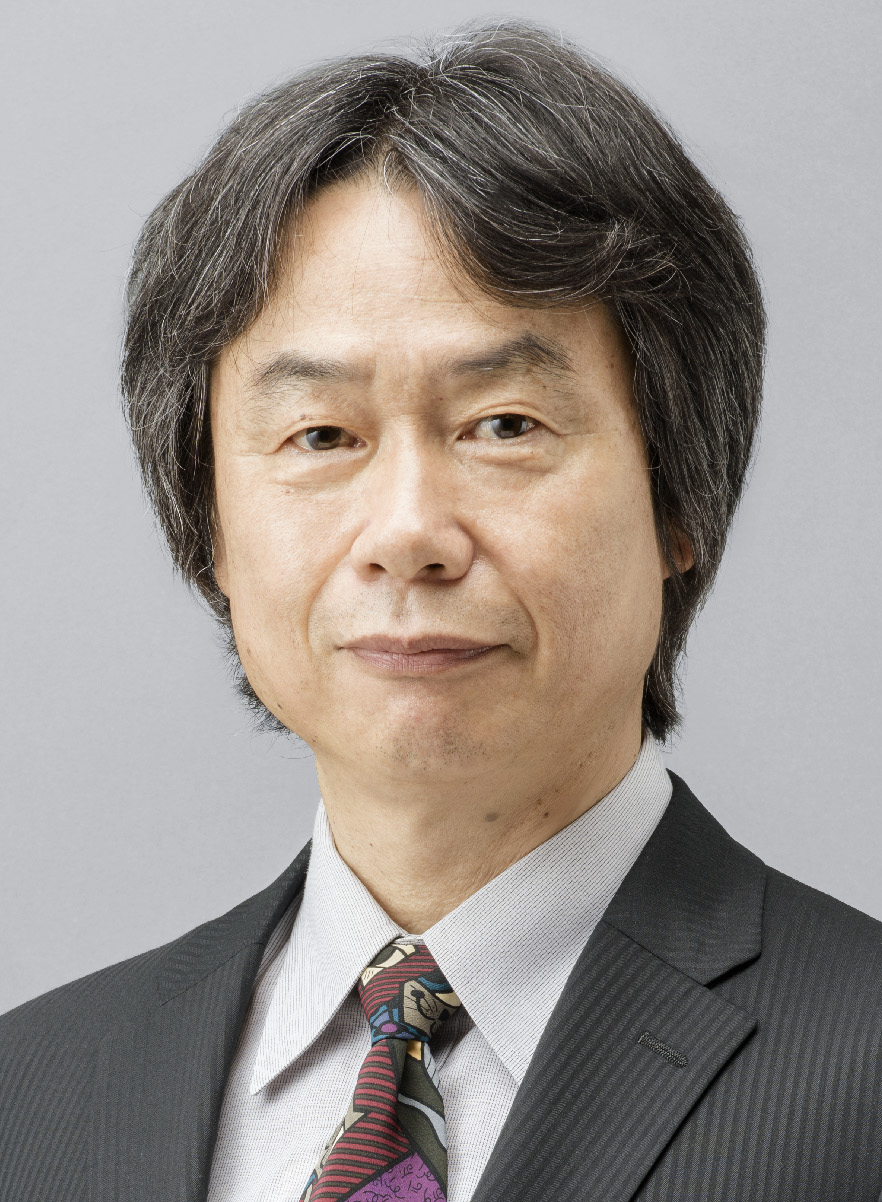
Shigeru Miyamoto, 2015

Princess Peach was preceded as Mario's romantic interest by a character named Pauline (originally named Lady) that appeared as the damsel in distress in Mario's first video game, Donkey Kong, in 1981. Mario's creator, Shigeru Miyamoto, wanted to use the characters Popeye, Bluto, and Olive Oyl from the Popeye cartoon as the main characters but failed to obtain the license, so he transformed them into Jumpman (Mario), Donkey Kong, and Pauline. Donkey Kong established Pauline's role as the female character who is rescued by Mario and appears as the damsel in distress in subsequent games. With the arrival of the Nintendo Entertainment System and Super Mario Bros., Pauline was replaced by Princess Peach. Miyamoto later said that Donkey Kong had been designed for arcades, which were frequented by male gamers, so Nintendo did not consider making a character that would be playable by girls. Several characteristics of Princess Peach were introduced in the 1996 role-playing game Super Mario RPG, including her use of a parasol as a weapon and a sleep spell ability that inspired her Final Smash in the Super Smash Bros. series.

Following the debut of Waluigi in Mario Tennis, an evil version of Peach named "Walupeach" was pitched by Shugo Takahashi, co-founder of Camelot Software Planning, but the concept was rejected by Miyamoto before seeing the design, saying that it would be "just like Doronjo" from the Yatterman anime series. The design was pitched again by Waluigi's creator, Fumihide Aoki, for the 2004 video game Mario Power Tennis, but was rejected by Nintendo.

When discussing Peach's portrayal in Super Princess Peach, released in 2005, Miyamoto said that it was important for Nintendo for Peach to be "Peach-like", meaning that she evokes the "free optimism of a Princess." He explained that she has never seen herself as being "protected" by Mario, and that their intended image of her is an image of strength, due to many Nintendo developers being used to a matriarchal figure at home.

Reflecting on Peach's role within the franchise, Miyamoto said that although Nintendo had intentionally "kept Peach as a damsel in distress who is rescued by Mario for a while", they had wanted to develop her into a "more powerful princess" by featuring her as a capable playable character in the games and giving her a major role in The Super Mario Bros. Movie. He said that Peach was one of the characters in the film that evolved the most, as her role was changed from a princess that needs to be protected to one who fights for her kingdom. After the release of the film in 2023, Peach's appearance was updated on the box art for Princess Peach: Showtime! to make her appear more angry and determined like her movie counterpart.

During a later interview for The Super Mario Galaxy Movie, Miyamoto elaborated further on the topic. He stated that Peach’s damsel in distress role was initially used out of a desire to provide players with a quick to understand objective, as he considered that clarity and simplicity in game objectives were very important. Miyamoto stated that he understood the criticisms that mentioned how the kidnapped damsel in distress role "didn't fit with the current image of women" but claimed that it was "a part of the game's mechanics that [couldn't] be easily changed" and therefore the common plot of "going to rescue the kidnapped princess" remained unchanged for many Mario games. Regarding the changes made to Peach's movie counterpart, he considered that presenting Peach as solely a "fighting female character" in The Super Mario Bros. Movie was "a bold change", but by the time of The Super Mario Galaxy Movie he acknowledged "that wasn't enough" and sought to depict "Peach's worries and emotions, and the fluctuations in her relationship with Mario" to make her movie counterpart "a richer character".

=== Design ===
Illustrations of Princess Peach drawn by Yōichi Kotabe

Peach's initial appearance was drawn by Miyamoto, who later asked Yōichi Kotabe to redraw Peach with his instructions. He had asked Kotabe to draw her eyes to be "a little cat-like" and wanted her to look "stubborn, but a little cute". A strategy guide titled How to Win at Super Mario Bros., which was published around the time of the first Super Mario Bros. game in 1985, depicted the princess as a human on its cover, but also with an alternative design featuring a mushroom head. Other merchandise designs created around the time of the first game depicted Peach with straight, long blonde hair wearing a red skirt, illustrating that her design was not finalized until later games.

=== Names ===
Miyamoto said that Peach's name came from associating princesses with girls, and when thinking about girls, he would think of pink. In Japan, Peach's name has always been Princess Peach (ピーチ姫, Pīchi-Hime) since her debut in the original Super Mario Bros. in 1985. However, she was localized as "Princess Toadstool" in the English-language manual. The English version of Yoshi's Safari, released in 1993, contained the first usage of the name "Peach" in the Western world, though she was called Princess Toadstool in Wario Land: Super Mario Land 3, released in 1994. In Super Mario 64, released in 1996, she uses both names in a letter addressed to Mario, signing it "Peach". From the 1996 game Mario Kart 64 onward, the name Peach is used in Western versions.

=== Voice acting ===
Various voice actors have provided the English voice for Princess Peach. Since 2025, she has been voiced by Courtney Lin. Peach was previously voiced by Samantha Kelly from 2007 to 2024, and by Jen Taylor from 2000 to 2007. Her other voice actors include Jeannie Elias in The Super Mario Bros. Super Show!, Tracey Moore in The Adventures of Super Mario Bros. 3 and Super Mario World, and Leslie Swan, a localization manager for Nintendo.

== Characteristics ==
Peach's crown emblem is used to represent her in many games.

Peach is the princess of the Mushroom Kingdom and ruler of her subjects, known as Toads, a species of mushroom-like people. Although she has appeared in a variety of outfits, Peach typically wears her pink princess dress with puffy sleeves combined with long white gloves. Her royal abode is a large castle with white walls and a red roof, adorned with a stained-glass portrait of the princess. Peach is the daughter of the Mushroom King (also named King Toadstool), a character that appears in the Super Mario Bros. comics and is mentioned in the manual for the first Super Mario Bros. video game but has never appeared in the video games. She is presented as one of the few humans in the kingdom, despite the Toads being the predominant race. Throughout the mainline series, the Mushroom Kingdom is under persistent attack from Bowser and his minions, and Peach's role is to be his kidnapping victim. Her age has never been officially confirmed, but it varies between mid-teens and early twenties.

Despite being the lead female character of the Mario franchise, Princess Peach has rarely been the protagonist of Mario video games. Since the first Super Mario Bros. video game, she has repeatedly been the damsel in distress of the main series, typically appearing at the end of the game to reward Mario after successfully rescuing her. She is a playable character in various spin-off games and has wielded several weapons, including a frying pan and a parasol. She also demonstrates magical powers, such as the ability to heal in Super Mario RPG. In the first Super Mario Bros. game, her white magic is the only way to undo the chaos caused by Bowser to the Mushroom Kingdom. Peach's relationship with Mario is a central element of the series, yet it remains ambiguous. Although Nintendo describes them as friends, suggestions of a romantic relationship between Peach and Mario recur throughout the series.

== Appearances ==
=== Super Mario series ===
Peach made her debut as Princess Toadstool in the 1985 platform game Super Mario Bros. on the Nintendo Entertainment System (NES). The story involves King Koopa kidnapping her and hiding her in one of eight dungeons, necessitating Mario and Luigi to find and rescue her. After navigating his way through eight worlds and defeating King Koopa over a pit of lava, Mario receives a "Thank you, Mario!" from the princess as a hero's reward. A sequel to the game was released in Japan in 1986 as Super Mario Bros. 2 and was eventually released in North America as part of Super Mario All-Stars in 1993, titled Super Mario Bros.: The Lost Levels. Like its predecessor, the game involves Mario or Luigi attempting to rescue the princess from Bowser. In 1988, the princess was upgraded to a playable character on the NES with the release of a second sequel titled Super Mario Bros. 2. As one of four playable characters in the game, she had the unique ability to float over obstacles. The game was made from a preexisting Japanese game named Yume Kōjō: Doki Doki Panic to repurpose it for a Western audience; thus, Princess Toadstool was used in place of Lina, one of the characters in the Japanese version. In the NES game Super Mario Bros. 3 (1988), Mario embarks on a quest to rescue seven kings from Bowser's Koopalings but eventually discovers that Peach has been kidnapped by Bowser. After Mario's quest to rescue the princess is complete, she rewards him with a joke and a dismissive "Bye bye".

Princess Toadstool returned as the kidnapped princess on the Super Nintendo Entertainment System (SNES) in Super Mario World (1990), which places Mario in a location called Dinosaur Land. Mario embarks on a quest that involves navigating through 9 locations to save Dinosaur Land from the Koopalings before rescuing the princess from Bowser. The princess is again the victim of Bowser in the 3D platform game Super Mario 64 (1996), released on the Nintendo 64. The game begins with Mario receiving a letter from "Princess Toadstool, Peach", asking him to come to her castle as she has baked a cake for him. Peach's Castle acts as a hub world and contains paintings that Mario can use to enter various worlds to complete challenges in order to win stars. At the end of the game, he must finally face Bowser and save the princess. After Bowser is defeated, the princess emerges from the stained-glass window that adorns the castle, having been held captive within its walls. In the GameCube title Super Mario Sunshine (2002), Mario, Peach, and some Toads take a holiday to Isle Delfino. Upon arrival, they find the tropical paradise is being polluted with paint by Shadow Mario, a mysterious doppelgänger of Mario. Shadow Mario is secretly Bowser's son, Bowser Jr., in disguise, and, after framing Mario for polluting the island, he kidnaps Peach. Bowser Jr. initially accuses the princess of being his mother, but after Mario defeats Bowser and rescues Peach, Bowser confirms that Peach is not Bowser Jr.'s mother.

New Super Mario Bros. (2006) returned the series to 2D platforming on the Nintendo DS. The game centers on Princess Peach being kidnapped by Bowser Jr. and Mario traveling through eight worlds to save her. Peach initiates the events of the 2007 Wii game Super Mario Galaxy by asking Mario to come to her castle because there is something she would like to give him. The plot involves Bowser kidnapping Peach and transporting her castle into outer space. Mario's quest requires him to complete levels and collect 60 power stars before he can travel to the center of the universe to rescue the princess. New Super Mario Bros. Wii (2009) was the first 2D side-scrolling platform game in the series to introduce multiplayer, with up to four players choosing to play as Mario, Luigi, or two Toad variations. Miyamoto said that Peach was not included as a playable character because her skirt would require special programming. The game opens with the princess being kidnapped by Bowser and his minions, necessitating Mario and Luigi to rescue her. In 2010, Nintendo released a sequel to Super Mario Galaxy with a 3D platformer on the Wii titled Super Mario Galaxy 2. Like its predecessor, the game centers on Princess Peach being abducted by Bowser, requiring Mario to travel through various worlds to save her.

The Nintendo 3DS game Super Mario 3D Land (2011) begins with Bowser kidnapping Princess Peach at the outset. The player controls Mario as he navigates through eight worlds to rescue her, with each ending in a boss fight with one of Bowser's henchmen. In New Super Mario Bros. 2 (2012), the Mushroom Kingdom is again under attack from Bowser and his Koopalings, who kidnap Peach. The game involves Mario and Luigi traveling through platform levels, collecting coins, and fighting bosses to save the princess. In Mario's 2012 Wii U debut, New Super Mario Bros. U, the action takes place in Dinosaur Land. The plot involves Bowser and his Koopalings taking Princess Peach hostage and Mario and friends making their way to the center of Mushroom Kingdom to save her. The game offers multiplayer for up to four players, featuring Mario, Luigi, and two Toads as playable characters. The game's director, Masataka Takemoto, explained that Princess Peach was not included as a playable character because he wanted all of the characters to have the same moves as Mario, and Peach was not well suited for that.

Although not initially planned to appear in the 2013 Wii U video game Super Mario 3D World, Peach was suggested by producer Yoshiaki Koizumi. The game was the first in the mainline series since Super Mario Bros. 2 to feature her as a playable character. Koizumi thought she could offer a more competitive choice in multiplayer. He also hoped that players would be able to play alongside their girlfriends or wives. Peach has the ability to use her gown to float while jumping, allowing her to avoid gaps and other obstacles. She can use power-ups that provide various effects and boosts, such as the cat suit, which gives her the ability to crawl and climb walls like a cat. When Peach gets the Fire Flower power-up, she transforms into Fire Peach, where her dress changes from pink to the colors of Fire Flowers. In the mobile game Super Mario Run (2016), Peach is one of several playable characters and is unlocked following the completion of the World Tour mode. The story of the World Tour mode involves Peach being kidnapped by Bowser. After she is unlocked, Peach can use her floaty jump ability during gameplay.

Peach begins the Nintendo Switch game Super Mario Odyssey (2017) being abducted by Bowser, who wants to marry her. She is confined to Bowser's flying boat, while Mario must travel the world to rescue her. At the end of the game, Bowser and Mario compete for Peach's affections, but she rejects them both, opting to travel the world on her own. In addition to her wedding dress, Peach wears a variety of outfits on her travels. Super Mario Maker 2 (2019) includes a story mode that tasks Mario with reconstructing Princess Peach's castle. By working through 100 courses, he can collect coins to pay for the construction of parts of the castle. When the castle is complete, Princess Peach allocates jobs via the Taskmaster, which unlocks wearable Mii outfits, including a Princess Peach Dress, Princess Peach Wig, and after completing all the tasks, a Princess Peach Tennis outfit. In Super Mario Bros. Wonder (2023), Princess Peach is one of several playable characters alongside Mario, Luigi, and others. The game centers on their visit to the Flower Kingdom, which is disrupted when Bowser steals the Wonder Flower and transforms into a flying castle.

=== Other Mario games ===
Princess Toadstool's Castle Run, a game based on Super Mario Bros. 2, which was released in 1990 on the Nelsonic Game Watch, was the first game to feature Princess Toadstool as the sole playable character. In 1993, she appeared in Mario is Missing!, an educational game developed by The Software Toolworks.

Peach is a playable character in most Mario spin-offs, including Mario Sports games, where she is a recurring character. She is one of four playable characters that appear at the beginning of Mario Golf (1999). She is one of several playable characters appearing in Mario Tennis in 2000. In Mario Golf: Advance Tour (2004), Peach is one of the Mushroom Kingdom inhabitants against whom the player competes in story mode. In Mario Superstar Baseball (2005), she has a star move, which gives her the ability to obscure the ball with hearts. Peach is one of seven core characters that are playable in every game in the Mario Strikers series. In the soccer game Super Mario Strikers (2005), she is one of the team captains or strikers. Peach is one of several Mario characters that can be selected to play for a team of three on the basketball court in Mario Hoops 3-on-3 (2006). In Mario Strikers Charged (2007), Peach is one of 12 team captains that can be selected for play. In Mario Strikers: Battle League (2022), Peach is one of the ten playable characters, each of whom can perform a unique move called a Hyper Strike. Peach's special move involves kicking the ball into a heart-shaped arch and temporarily stunning other characters. Alongside Mario and Sonic, Peach is one of 14 additional playable characters that appear in Mario & Sonic at the Olympic Games (2007). In the baseball game Mario Super Sluggers (2008), Peach is one of the main characters that can be chosen for the player's team once before disappearing, unlike secondary characters who can be selected multiple times. As well as being a playable character in Mario Golf: World Tour (2014), Peach also has a course named "Peach's Playground". She performs a special move in Mario Tennis Aces (2018), which involves spinning and leaping and finishing with a heart.

She is a returning character in the kart racing game series Mario Kart and appears as one of eight playable characters in the first video game, Super Mario Kart (1992). A variation named Cat Peach was introduced as one of three playable characters in the first DLC pack for Mario Kart 8 in 2014. The game also debuted a variation named Pink Gold Peach. Mario Kart 8 Deluxe features a playable Peach, as well as Cat Peach, a baby version of Peach, and Pink Gold Peach. Mario Kart Tour increased the number of playable options and includes Cherub Baby Peach, Kimono Peach, Pink Gold Peach, Vacation Peach, and Wintertime Peach as alternate costumes.

In 1996, the princess appeared in Super Mario RPG: Legend of the Seven Stars. She is one of the party members and the final character to join the team. In gameplay, she can use defensive and healing moves or attack with a weapon, such as a frying pan or parasol. The game begins with the princess being kidnapped by Bowser, resulting in Mario setting off to rescue her. Although she was named Princess Toadstool in the original game, she was renamed Princess Peach in the 2023 remake released on the Nintendo Switch.

She has been a staple character of the Mario Party series since the first Mario Party, which was released for the Nintendo 64 in 1998. In the first game, she is one of six playable Nintendo characters that can be selected in a party of one to four players. One of the game's 2D board maps is named "Peach's Birthday Cake".

Peach appears in the Paper Mario series starting from the Paper Mario video game (2000). In the first game, she is kidnapped by Bowser after inviting Mario and Luigi to her castle for a party, requiring Mario to retrieve seven Star Spirits in order to rescue her. Players can play as Peach in sections of the game as she repeatedly attempts to escape the castle. In Paper Mario: The Thousand-Year Door (2004), Peach invites Mario to the town of Rogueport for a treasure hunt, but she is kidnapped and held in a fortress by the X-Nauts, leaving Mario to collect seven Crystal Stars while trying to find her. Players control Mario, but at the end of each of the eight chapters, the gameplay switches to Peach as she wanders around the fortress while attempting to escape. Peach is again kidnapped in Super Paper Mario (2007), in which Mario must set off to recover eight Pure Hearts in order to find her. During gameplay, Peach teams up with Mario as a playable character, where she can perform a floaty jump. In Paper Mario: Sticker Star (2012), she and the Toads are enjoying a sticker festival in the Mushroom Kingdom until Bowser arrives to cause chaos, resulting in Mario collecting stickers to save the kingdom. In the 2016 follow-up game Paper Mario: Color Splash, Mario, Peach, and Toad are invited to Prism Island, which is being drained of color. When Peach is kidnapped, Mario and a paint bucket companion named Huey must save the island and Peach. In Paper Mario: The Origami King (2020), Peach and the Toads are folded into origami versions by King Olly, so Mario and friends must fight to restore them.

In the role-playing video game series Mario & Luigi, Peach is a recurring character. In Mario & Luigi: Superstar Saga (2003), Bowser recruits Mario and Luigi to help him restore Peach's voice after it was sucked up into a device by a mystery guest and replaced with speech that converts to explosives. In the second entry, Mario & Luigi: Partners in Time (2005), the brothers must save Peach and the Mushroom Kingdom from being conquered by the evil Shroobs by traveling between the past and the present. Mario & Luigi: Bowser's Inside Story (2009) continues Mario and Luigi's efforts to save Peach after the villain Fawful tricks Bowser into eating a type of mushroom that causes him to inhale the Mushroom Kingdom, forcing the brothers to save Peach after being trapped inside Bowser's body. In Mario & Luigi: Dream Team (2013), Mario and Luigi must work with a character named Prince Dreambert to save Peach after she is sucked through a portal into the dreamworld while staying on Pi'illo Island. Mario & Luigi: Paper Jam (2015) follows Mario and Luigi on a quest to save Peach after both she and her paper version are kidnapped by Bowser. She also appeared in Mario & Luigi: Brothership (2024).

Peach is the protagonist and playable character of Super Princess Peach (2005), a platform game with mechanics similar to Super Mario games. Set on Vibe Island, the game begins with Bowser using the Vibe Scepter to capture Mario and Luigi, resulting in Princess Peach embarking on a quest to rescue them with the help of her talking umbrella, Perry. During the game, she must navigate levels, release captured Toads, and finally face Bowser. In gameplay, she can stomp on enemies and attack them using Perry in various ways. Peach's health is measured with a heart meter. She also has a Vibe meter, which governs her four emotions: joy, gloom, rage, and calm. Each emotion power provides a unique ability; joy powers her to float in a cyclone, gloom creates floods of tears, rage engulfs her in flames, and calm restores her health.

Peach appears in two turn-based crossover games between the Mario and Ubisoft's Rabbids franchises. In Mario + Rabbids Kingdom Battle, the player begins with three characters, one of which is Rabbid Peach, a Rabbid version of Peach, who has the ability to heal allies and perform a stylish dash, which can kill multiple enemies. After being unlocked at the end of World 2, Peach is also a playable character and carries a short-range shotgun called a boomshot and tosses grenades at enemies. She also has the ability to perform a healing jump to heal allies. Peach and her Rabbid counterpart return along with other Nintendo characters in Mario + Rabbids Sparks of Hope.

In 2019, a variant named Dr. Peach was introduced as one of ten playable characters in the mobile puzzle game Dr. Mario World. Her special skill cleared a row of objects when her skill meter was full. Another variant named Dr. Fire Peach was later added in 2020.

Peach stars in the Nintendo Switch game Princess Peach: Showtime!, which was released March 22, 2024. With a focus on a theatrical theme, it centers around Peach saving Sparkle Theatre from the antagonist Grape and her minions, the Sour Bunch. With the help of Stella, the theater's guardian, she can change into various outfits with specific abilities. Her transformations include Swordfighter Peach, Patissier Peach, Kung Fu Peach, Detective Peach, Figure Skater Peach, Mermaid Peach, and Mighty Peach. The game is the first to feature Peach as the protagonist since the release of Super Princess Peach.

=== Other video games ===
Peach is a playable character in the fighting game series Super Smash Bros. and has appeared in every game since being introduced in Super Smash Bros. Melee. Upon her debut in Melee, her moveset included the ability to float in the air and throw turnips at opponents. Super Smash Bros. Brawl introduced her final smash, Peach Blossom, which causes opponents to fall asleep and take damage. In Super Smash Bros. Ultimate, her fighting moves include using Toad as a shield, jumping upwards and using her parasol to float down, and her final smash, Peach Blossom. Peach is one of several playable Mario characters that appear alongside characters from the Dragon Quest series in Itadaki Street DS, a Monopoly-style board game published by Square Enix. In May 2016, a Super Mario Mash-Up Pack released as downloadable content for the Wii U edition of Minecraft featured Peach as one of 12 skins used as playable Nintendo characters. Peach's Castle was also recreated as a location in the game. Peach has also made cameo appearances in non-Mario games. She is depicted in a painting in Hyrule Castle in The Legend of Zelda: Ocarina of Time. In The Legend of Zelda: Link's Awakening, a character named Christine sends her picture to a letter writer named Mr. Write, but it is a portrait of Princess Peach. She features as a playable guest character alongside Mario and Luigi in the GameCube versions of the Electronic Arts games NBA Street V3 and SSX on Tour.

=== Other media ===
In 1986, a Japanese anime film was produced titled Super Mario Bros.: The Great Mission to Rescue Princess Peach!. Written by Hideo Takayashiki and directed by Masami Hata, it was based on the events of the first Super Mario Bros. video game. The story involves Princess Peach escaping from the video game world into Mario's world before being captured and pulled back to the Mushroom Kingdom by King Koopa. Mario and Luigi are lured into the Mushroom Kingdom by a dog in order to save her.

In September 1989, Peach appeared in a children's TV show, The Super Mario Bros. Super Show!. She is voiced by Jeannie Elias in The Super Mario Bros. Super Show! and Tracey Moore in the two follow-up series The Adventures of Super Mario Bros. 3 and Super Mario World.

Throughout 1992, Peach (named Princess Toadstool) appeared in a comic titled Super Mario Adventures, which was serialized in Nintendo Power. The plot involves Bowser proposing marriage to her and threatening to turn her subjects to stone if she refuses. After Mario is turned to stone, she and her troops pursue Bowser down a pipe, but she is eventually captured by Bowser. Rather than remaining idle, she demonstrates resourcefulness in various ways, including tricking her way out of her cell, escaping from a window using a yellow cape, and popping out of a pizza box holding a bomb in an effort to save Mario.

Princess Peach is also prominently featured within Universal Studios Japan and Universal Studios Hollywood's immersive Super Nintendo World areas. A costume character meet-and-greet with her is located in her pavilion. The interactive "Power-Up Bands" feature a design based on her dress.

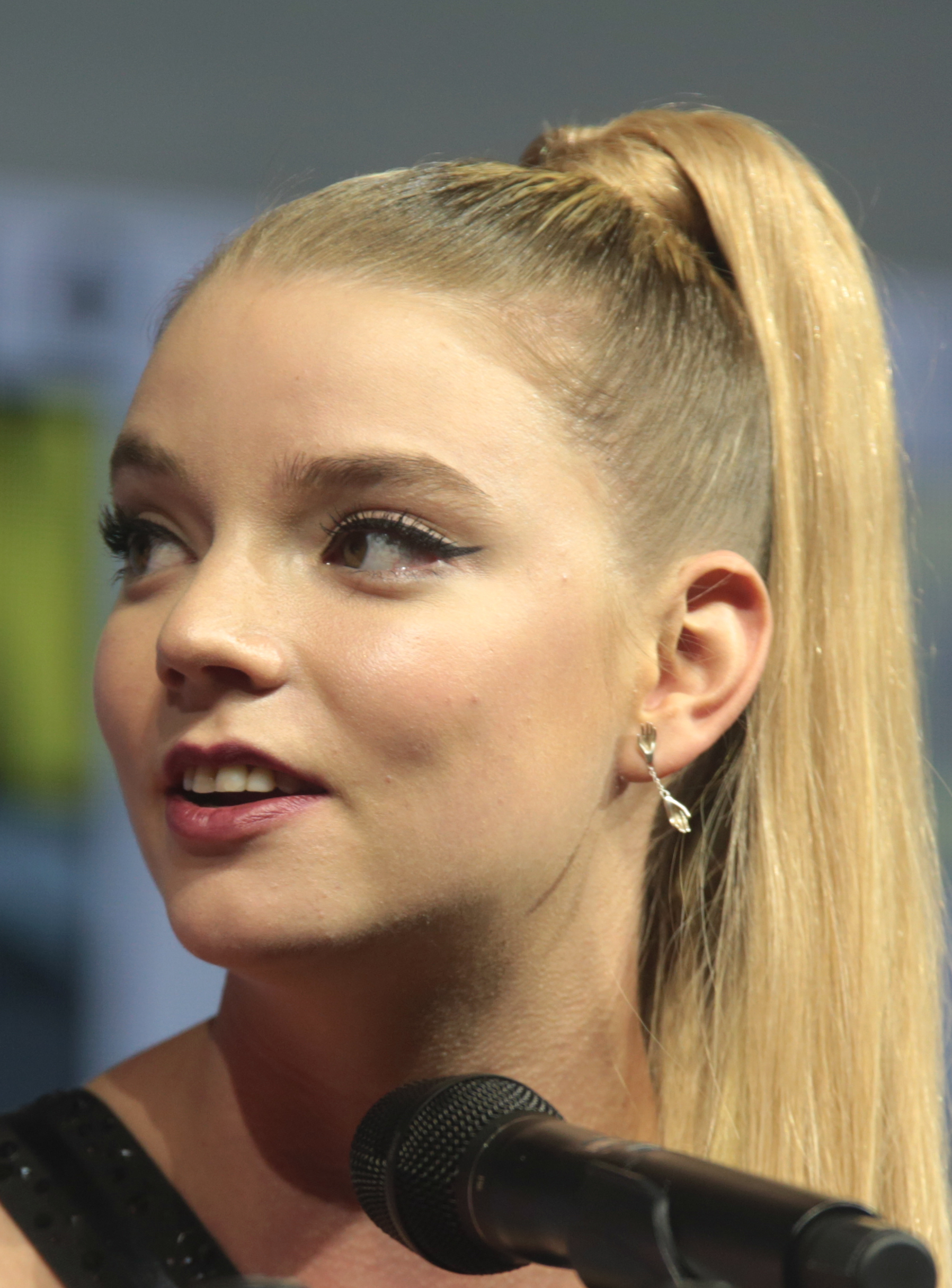
Anya Taylor-Joy voices Princess Peach in The Super Mario Bros. Movie and The Super Mario Galaxy Movie.

Peach is voiced by Anya Taylor-Joy in The Super Mario Bros. Movie (2023) and The Super Mario Galaxy Movie (2026). Her casting, alongside the rest of the principal cast, was announced via a Nintendo Direct in September 2021. In the film, Peach is Mario's guide and romantic interest, having been raised by the Toads from infancy in the Mushroom Kingdom. Director Aaron Horvath said that Luigi became the victim Mario must save to substitute Peach's traditional role in video games as the damsel in distress so she can remain a strong monarch and protector of the Toads. Taylor-Joy said that she was concerned before taking the role but that her portrayal of Peach as a strong, capable leader was "the way she was supposed to be." A song from the film, which was titled "Peaches" and written and performed by Bowser voice actor Jack Black, was released in April 2023. In The Super Mario Galaxy Movie, Peach is revealed as the younger sister of Princess Rosalina, who sent her to the Mushroom Kingdom when she was an infant to protect her from danger.

== Merchandise ==
Peach has been merchandised across a range of official products, including plush toys and action figures. An amiibo of Peach wearing a pink gown was released for the Super Smash Bros. series in November 2014. In 2015, another version was released as part of a set of Super Mario amiibo. In 2017, a set of themed amiibo was released for Super Mario Odyssey, including an amiibo of Peach wearing a wedding outfit. A limited edition double pack featuring Cat Peach alongside Cat Mario was released for Super Mario 3D World + Bowser's Fury in February 2021. In December 2014, a rare legless Peach amiibo resulting from a factory defect achieved a Guinness World Record for being the most expensive amiibo figure. Peach's color scheme and crown motif have been used to market themed controllers, including a pink Wii Remote Plus controller in 2014 and a pastel pink Joy-Con for the Switch in 2024. She has also been featured in other licensed Mario products, including as an interactive figure in the Lego Super Mario range and as a Hot Wheels collectible.

== Reception ==
=== Critical reception ===
Sam Loveridge of Digital Spy described Peach as one of the most iconic female game characters of all time, naming her an icon that transcends gaming and commenting that she "acts as one of Nintendo's main mascots on a worldwide scale." Syfy also described Peach as one of the "greatest video game heroines of all time" for being a tough female character that "embraces the power of being a high femme." Alyse Knorr, writer for Kotaku, noted that Peach is one of many examples of the damsel in distress trope that recurs throughout history, commenting that she is such a damsel cliché that she mainly existed as a plot device rather than as an individual character and that her role was to provide Mario with a reason to exist. Feminist organization Sister Namibia was critical of the fact that Peach always needed to be rescued, reasoning that "it propagates that women are helpless and in constant need of saving" and "[she] serves quite literally as a trophy for the completion of Mario's quest. She is ultimately just another object or reward for Mario to use." Mike Fahey of Kotaku created a "victimization record" for Princess Peach that detailed her many kidnappings within the series, commenting, "There are few women with more kidnappings under their belt than her royal mushroom highness". In an article about the impact of princesses on girls, Peggy Orenstein of The New York Times said that she loved Peach but noted that "her peachiness did nothing to upset the apple cart of expectation". She considered Peach to be an ideal postfeminist solution by "the melding of old and new standards."

Josh Straub of Game Informer named the repeated failure to find the princess in the first Super Mario Bros. game as one of the most memorable moments in gaming history, stating that reaching the end of a world and being told by a Toad, "But our princess is in another castle!" was a "method of torture" that forced the player to face another round of platforming. Kotaku writer Peter Tieryas considered Peach to be the best character in Super Mario Bros. 2 and emphasized that her floating ability was the first of Nintendo's solutions for fine-tuning jumping in platform games. Matt Kamen of Wired UK appreciated the plot of Super Mario Sunshine for having "a bit more impetus to a game than 'rescue Peach (again)'" and felt that this offered more depth and personality to the characters. Super Princess Peach having Peach as the heroine and protagonist instead of the damsel in distress was praised by many outlets. Video Games Chronicle's Chris Scullion said that Peach's starring role in the game should have been a turning point for the character but considered it "an average platformer with a questionable central mechanic" by focusing on her "getting emotional". Mark Bozon of IGN thought that Peach's emotion powers and use of coins to shop were "borderline insulting" and seemed like "a girls game made by guys." Brett Elston from GamesRadar+ conversely considered Peach's emotions "useful tools" used in a "constructive manner" to clear obstacles and defeat enemies, and stated that using them was "more fun than just jumping around". Jordan Biordi of CGMagazine defended the game's design by remarking that its intention was to show "actively feeling and expressing emotion as a way to solve problems" and noted that Peach was not portrayed as overwhelmed by uncontrollable feelings but contrarily being able to freely control them at will. They framed the negative commentary as "a patriarchy-driven reading problem", and felt the focus on emotions was an empowering design choice for its time rather than a flaw. Mike Sholars of Kotaku felt that the introduction of Rosalina in Super Mario Galaxy impacted the Super Mario series so that it no longer needed to rely on the concept of saving the princess and enabled Peach to be more than a plot device.

Bryan Vore of Game Informer praised Super Mario 3D World for being the first game in 25 years of the mainline series since Super Mario Bros. 2 to include Peach as a playable character, saying that it demonstrated Nintendo's willingness to change the formula. The New York Times writer Chris Suellentrop opined in 2016 that Super Mario Run was not a family-friendly game due to its "stale, retrograde gender stereotypes" and said that Nintendo had failed to update Peach for a more modern audience by beginning the game with her being a hostage. Erik Kain of Forbes rebutted this view towards the game, remarking that it "did in fact, try" to address the criticism by making Peach playable after being rescued and featuring other female playable characters. Sam Loveridge of GamesRadar+ felt that in Super Mario Odyssey, Nintendo "was playing him from the start" by beginning the game with Peach being abducted by Bowser and ending it with a scene in which she rejects the romantic advances of both Bowser and Mario. He commented that Peach "shrugs off all those years of being the damsel in distress to forge her own path in the world as a single woman" and that in doing so, Nintendo was clearly recognizing its female fanbase. Rebekah Valentine of IGN said that Princess Peach: Showtime! was the opportunity to see Peach "defined only by herself" rather than by Mario. Following the game's release, Tom Regan of The Guardian found the game to be disappointing and considered it to be "patronising" to its "capable heroine" and a wasted opportunity to celebrate the princess. Conversely, Polygon, IGN, and Nintendo Life all responded positively and considered it to be the spotlight she deserved. Ashley Bardhan of Eurogamer said that, rather than casting Peach in her usual role of Bowser's victim, the game made her a "girl with some agency" and thought that her future was "no longer doomed with dead-end kidnapping" but now had limitless potential.

Los Angeles Times writer Tracy Brown said that Peach started out as an unappealing character due to being simply a princess waiting to be rescued but was given more personality in later games. She further remarked that The Super Mario Bros. Movie incarnation had subverted her characteristics by depicting an empowered ruler who is capable of engaging in battle and protecting her subjects without it being at the expense of her feminine design. Christian Holub of Entertainment Weekly responded positively to Peach's characterization in the film, calling her "a female protagonist for the Rey generation" but also a relatable character for older players. GamesRadar+ writer Hope Bellingham appreciated her active role in the story, describing her as "the brains behind the operation", even though Mario has the starring role. By contrast, Julia Glassman of The Mary Sue considered her film incarnation to be a common sexist trope where the badass female character must step aside for an average male by supporting and training him rather than taking the lead. Vulture's Alison Willmore also criticized the portrayal of Princess Peach in the movie for only being a "winsome blonde whose main quality is being so good at everything". The Washington Post writer Gene Park felt that Peach had been "empowered" long before her movie incarnation due to being "the most visible woman in video games, having appeared in more titles than any fictional woman in the medium" with numerous playable appearances since Super Mario Bros. 2. They referred to her "empowered" appearance in the movie as "just another example" but hoped that it would help transform her image in the public consciousness. Logan Plant of IGN described Peach as "one of Nintendo's most iconic characters" and felt that Nintendo was finally giving her the attention she deserved in film and video games.

=== Legacy ===
Peach has been described as one of the greatest video game characters by game websites and publications, including the 2011 version of the Guinness World Records Gamer's Edition and GameSpot, which described her as "arguably the most famous woman in video game history". Time named Peach as one of the most influential video game characters of all time, describing her as the "quintessential damsel in distress", but noted that Nintendo had improved her status over time by making her a playable character and introducing her in other game series like Super Smash Bros. Peach was cited as being an influence on other video game developers creating strong female protagonists. Tracey John, writing for Time, commented that Peach's repeated abductions had become a running joke and a pop culture reference. In 2018, a short comic, "The Super Crown's some spicy new Mario lore", on DeviantArt and Twitter transformed Bowser into a monstrously sinister female resembling Peach that fans named Bowsette, which inspired numerous works of fan art. In May 2021, in an episode of Saturday Night Live, Grimes dressed as Princess Peach, while host Elon Musk starred as Wario in a sketch in which he was put on trial for murdering Mario in a kart race.
