= NLG =

NLG may refer to:

- Dutch guilder, former currency with the ISO 4217 code "NLG"
- Natural language generation
- National Lawyers Guild
- Next Level Games
- Nose landing gear - a landing gear in the nose of an airplane; see also tricycle landing gear
