= List of Luigi video games =

Luigi
- The emblem of Luigi's hat as commonly used in the series
- Genres: Action-adventure, edutainment, survival horror, platformer, puzzle
- Developers: The Software Toolworks; Radical Entertainment; Next Level Games; Nintendo Software Planning & Development; Arika; Capcom
- Publisher: Nintendo
- Platforms: PC, Macintosh, NES, SNES, GameCube, Nintendo 3DS, Wii U, Arcade, Nintendo Switch
- First release: Luigi's Hammer Toss (c. 1990)
- Latest release: Luigi's Mansion 2 HD (June 27, 2024)
- Parent series: Mario

Numerous video games primarily starring Luigi, the younger brother of the titular character from the Mario franchise, have been released for various Nintendo video game consoles and handhelds dating from the Game & Watch to the Nintendo Switch. Nintendo has developed and published most Luigi video games such as the spin-off series starring him, Luigi's Mansion.

== History ==
Luigi was introduced in the 1983 Game & Watch title Mario Bros., where he and Mario work in a bottling plant. He later appeared widely in the arcade game Mario Bros., released two weeks later. The first game to star Luigi and to use the Luigi branding was the 1990 game Luigi's Hammer Toss, in which Luigi uses a shield to deflect hammers being thrown by Hammer Bros. More recently, he has appeared in the Luigi's Mansion series. Two of the original Nintendo Entertainment System (NES) Mario games, with those being Super Mario Bros. and the NES port of Mario Bros., have been ported to the Wii U and altered to feature Luigi as the protagonist instead of Mario.

=== Mini-games ===
Nintendo Land for Wii U features an attraction called "Luigi's Ghost Mansion", heavily inspired by Luigi's Mansion. "Luigi's Ghost Mansion" involves up to four players dressed like Luigi, Mario, Waluigi and Wario respectively, who assume the roles of "ghost trackers" and explore a haunted house to hunt for the fifth player, who is the ghost.

Included in NES Remix 2 is Super Luigi Bros., a Luigi-themed and mirrored version of Super Mario Bros. It features Luigi's higher jumping ability, which had not been originally introduced until the 1986 Japanese sequel Super Mario Bros.: The Lost Levels.

An unlockable Luigi-themed version of Mario Bros. titled Luigi Bros. was also included with Super Mario 3D World and its Nintendo Switch re-release Super Mario 3D World + Bowser's Fury.

== List of games ==
=== Luigi's Mansion series ===
Game	Details
Luigi's Mansion Original release date(s): JP: September 14, 2001; NA: November 18, 2001; EU: May 3, 2002; AU: May 17, 2002	Release years by system: 2001 – GameCube; 2018 – Nintendo 3DS; 2025 – Nintendo Switch 2
Luigi's Mansion Original release date(s): JP: September 14, 2001; NA: November 18, 2001; EU: May 3, 2002; AU: May 17, 2002	Notes: Developed by Nintendo EAD; Titled Luigi Mansion in Japan; Remade for the Nintendo 3DS by Grezzo
Luigi's Mansion: Dark Moon Original release date(s): JP: March 20, 2013; NA: March 24, 2013; EU: March 28, 2013; AU: March 28, 2013	Release years by system: 2013 – Nintendo 3DS; 2024 – Nintendo Switch
Luigi's Mansion: Dark Moon Original release date(s): JP: March 20, 2013; NA: March 24, 2013; EU: March 28, 2013; AU: March 28, 2013	Notes: Developed by Next Level Games; Titled Luigi Mansion 2 in Japan and Luigi's Mansion 2 in Europe and Australia; Ported to Nintendo Switch by Tantalus Media
Luigi's Mansion Arcade Original release date(s): JP: June 18, 2015	Release years by system: 2015 – Arcade
Luigi's Mansion Arcade Original release date(s): JP: June 18, 2015	Notes: Developed by Capcom
Luigi's Mansion 3 Original release date(s): October 31, 2019	Release years by system: 2019 – Nintendo Switch
Luigi's Mansion 3 Original release date(s): October 31, 2019	Notes: Developed by Next Level Games; Titled Luigi Mansion 3 in Japan

=== Others ===
Game	Details
Luigi's Hammer Toss Original release date(s): 1990	Release years by system: 1990 – Game Watch
Luigi's Hammer Toss Original release date(s): 1990	Notes: Based on Super Mario Bros. 2
Mario Is Missing! Original release date(s): NA: June 1, 1992; EU: December 10, 1992; JP: December 14, 1992	Release years by system: 1992 – PC, Macintosh, SNES; 1993 – NES
Mario Is Missing! Original release date(s): NA: June 1, 1992; EU: December 10, 1992; JP: December 14, 1992	Notes: Developed by The Software Toolworks; Ported to NES by Radical Entertainment
New Super Luigi U Original release date(s): DLC: JP: June 19, 2013; WW: June 20, 2013; Retail: JP: July 13, 2013; EU: July 26, 2013; AU: July 27, 2013; NA: August 25, 2013	Release years by system: 2013 – Wii U
New Super Luigi U Original release date(s): DLC: JP: June 19, 2013; WW: June 20, 2013; Retail: JP: July 13, 2013; EU: July 26, 2013; AU: July 27, 2013; NA: August 25, 2013	Notes: Released in two different versions: a downloadable content (DLC) package released on the Nintendo eShop for the main game New Super Mario Bros. U, and a standalone retail version; A bundle containing New Super Mario Bros. U and New Super Luigi U was released on October 16, 2015.; A deluxe version of the game was released for Nintendo Switch in January 2019 featuring both New Super Mario Bros. U and New Super Luigi U.
Dr. Luigi Original release date(s): NA: December 31, 2013; WW: January 15, 2014	Release years by system: 2013 – Wii U
Dr. Luigi Original release date(s): NA: December 31, 2013; WW: January 15, 2014	Notes: Developed by Arika and Nintendo SPD
