= Luigi's Mansion: Dark Moon =

2013 video game

- North American packaging artwork
- Developer: Next Level Games (Note: Luigi's Mansion 2 HD developed by Tantalus Media with assistance from Zero One and Lakshya Digital)
- Publisher: Nintendo
- Director: Bryce Holliday
- Producers: Bjorn Nash; Eric Randall; Shigeru Miyamoto
- Designer: Jason Carr
- Programmer: David Catlin
- Artist: Neil Singh
- Writer: Eric Smith
- Composers: Chad York; Darren Radtke; Mike Peacock
- Series: Luigi's Mansion
- Platforms: Nintendo 3DS; Nintendo Switch
- Release: Nintendo 3DS; JP: March 20, 2013; NA: March 24, 2013; PAL: March 28, 2013; Nintendo Switch; WW: June 27, 2024
- Genre: Action-adventure
- Modes: Single-player, multiplayer

Luigi's Mansion: Dark Moon (known as Luigi's Mansion 2 (Note: Japanese: ルイージマンション2, Hepburn: Ruīji Manshon Tsū) in Japan, Australia and Europe) is a 2013 action-adventure game developed by Next Level Games and published by Nintendo for the Nintendo 3DS. It is the second installment in the Luigi's Mansion series, following Luigi's Mansion (2001). The story follows Luigi as he explores Evershade Valley, capturing its corrupted ghostly inhabitants with help from Professor E. Gadd. In order to restore peace to Evershade Valley, Luigi must defeat the recently-escaped King Boo and restore the eponymous Dark Moon.

In Dark Moon, the player controls Luigi, who captures ghosts using a vacuum cleaner called the Poltergust 5000. In the single-player mode, the goal is to rescue Mario from King Boo and retrieve the shattered pieces of the Dark Moon, which can pacify Evershade Valley's ghosts. Exploration is divided into five unique areas, which are each split into multiple mission-based levels containing obstacles and puzzles. The Poltergust 5000 is equipped with features to capture ghosts and solve puzzles. Dark Moon also offers a cooperative multiplayer mode that can be played locally or online via the Nintendo Network on the Nintendo 3DS or via Nintendo Switch Online in the remaster for the Nintendo Switch.

After experimentation to create a glasses-free 3D variant of the original Luigi's Mansion on the GameCube, the Luigi's Mansion series would remain dormant for roughly a decade. Dark Moon was outsourced to Next Level Games, a company that had worked on Nintendo titles in the past. Shigeru Miyamoto and select Nintendo employees supervised the project, but overall were hands-off with the project. The overall design goal was to create diverse experiences for the player, exploring how each game element could be used to its fullest. Many of these elements were altered to conform to the technology of the Nintendo 3DS, such as its dual screens and 3D capabilities.

Dark Moon was announced at E3 2011, with further details revealed throughout 2012. When the game was delayed into 2013, Nintendo decided to promote the game as part of a "Year of Luigi", with additional Luigi-themed games and merchandise announced for the character's 30th anniversary. Dark Moon released in Japan on March 20, 2013, with other regional releases later that same month. The game received generally positive reviews from critics, praising its graphics, worldbuilding, and new features, while also attracting criticism for its mission-based structure and lack of checkpoints. The game was nominated for several awards, and sold 6.44 million copies as of December 2020, making it one of the bestselling video games for the Nintendo 3DS. An arcade cabinet based on Dark Moon's assets, titled Luigi's Mansion Arcade, was released to arcades worldwide on June 18, 2015. A third entry in the series, titled Luigi's Mansion 3, was released worldwide on October 31, 2019, for the Nintendo Switch. A remaster titled Luigi's Mansion 2 HD was released on the Nintendo Switch on June 27, 2024.

== Gameplay ==
Luigi capturing a ghost. To successfully capture, the player must vacuum the ghost until its hit points reach zero. The touchscreen shows the player's location in the current mansion being explored.

Luigi's Mansion: Dark Moon is a 3D action-adventure game in which the player controls Mario's brother Luigi, who is sent by Professor E. Gadd to explore abandoned haunted areas in Evershade Valley and capture hostile ghosts using the Poltergust 5000, a specialized vacuum cleaner. In the main single-player mode, the player explores five different "mansions" in search of pieces of the Dark Moon, a crystal moon with the power to calm the ghosts of the valley, which has split shattered apart. Each location is designed around a specific theme, such as a wet and overgrown set of towers with a graveyard, a clock factory covered in sand, a mine filled with ice and a haunted museum.

Exploration through an area is divided into multiple mission-based levels that focus on completing a number of objectives, such as retrieving an object, accessing a particular room or defeating a stronger boss ghost. At the end of each mission, the player is scored based on various factors such as the treasures and ghosts collected. If Luigi takes too much damage from ghost attacks or environmental hazards and loses all his heart points, he will faint and the player must restart the mission. If the player finds and collects a golden bone, Luigi will be revived and continue the mission instead of starting over. The Nintendo 3DS touchscreen shows a mini-map of the areas' layouts, with the main objective being highlighted with an exclamation mark. Toad accompanies can be found in certain missions, where Luigi has to escort each one out of the area they are found in. At the end of each area, the player battles a "Possessor", a boss ghost that possesses objects, in order to get the Dark Moon piece inside of it.

To capture a ghost, the player first stuns the ghost using Luigi's flashlight equipped with the Strobulb attachment. While Luigi's Mansion required the player to shine the light on the ghost, in Dark Moon, the player charges the Strobulb to release a burst of light that acts similar to a flashbang. When stunned, the ghost's health meter is exposed, allowing Luigi to vacuum the ghost to decrease the meter until it is weak enough to be captured. In addition to capturing ghosts, the suction and blowing functions of the Poltergust 5000 are used to manipulate and carry objects in the environment. Many of the game's puzzles are designed around this concept. For example, the player uses the vacuum to carry buckets of water, yank pull switches, spin valve handles and propel small objects. Other objects, such as certain types of switches and locks, react only when exposed to the Strobulb flash. Early in the game, the player obtains the Dark-Light Device, which reveals invisible doors and furniture. Every mission features a hidden Boo that can be uncovered with the Dark Light Device, which can unlock a bonus mission in each mansion if every Boo in a mansion is caught. Alongside Boos, each mansion houses a set of thirteen gems for the player to find. The Poltergust can be upgraded to increase its power by collecting money scattered throughout the mansion.

Dark Moon features a cooperative multiplayer mode called "ScareScraper" ("Thrill Tower" in Europe), in which up to four players each control a differently colored Luigi. The players explore each floor of an area and complete the specified objective within a time limit. When the objective is completed, the players ascend to the next floor. The floors are all randomly generated, with different floor layouts and placement of ghosts and items, and the players may select whether the area has a limited or endless number of floors. Four different objective types are available: Hunter, in which all the ghosts on the floor must be captured; Rush, where players race to find the exit to the next floor; Polterpup, where players pursue and capture ghost dogs; and Surprise, in which one of the other three objectives is randomly chosen per floor. "ScareScraper" can be played locally or online via Nintendo Network on the Nintendo 3DS or via Nintendo Switch Online on the Nintendo Switch.

== Plot ==
King Boo, who had recently escaped from his painting imprisonment, (Note: As depicted in the 2001 video game Luigi's Mansion) shatters the Dark Moon, a large and crystalline object suspended above Evershade Valley which has a pacifying effect on its ghostly inhabitants, using the magical jewel embedded in his crown. This causes the ghosts to become hostile, forcing Professor E. Gadd to take shelter in his bunker while a dark fog covers the valley. From the bunker, E. Gadd contacts Luigi and unwillingly teleports him to the bunker, with E. Gadd showing a shattered piece of the Dark Moon to Luigi. to help recover the pieces of the Dark Moon. The professor reveals that five other pieces have landed across the Evershade Valley, leading to E. Gadd enlisting Luigi to recover the remaining Dark Moon pieces and to capture and contain the ghosts before they leave the valley and wreak havoc on the rest of the world. To aid Luigi, he provides him with several gadgets: a flashlight; the Poltergust 5000, an upgraded version of the Poltergust 3000; the Dual Scream, a Nintendo DS-like device used for navigation and communication purposes; and the Dark-Light Device, a special lens used for uncovering hidden objects and Boos.

Luigi makes his way through the five mansions of the valley, recovering a piece of the Dark Moon from powerful "Possessor" ghosts, entrusted by King Boo to guard them, in each area and saving the professor's Toad assistants, who have been trapped in paintings. The Toads share security images that provide valuable clues to the whereabouts of the Dark Moon pieces and each one shows a pair of Boos carrying a bag with a painting inside. Whenever a Dark Moon piece is recovered, parts of the dark fog is lifted. Eventually, Luigi and E. Gadd find out that King Boo is behind the whole crisis in the valley and is detaining Mario in the painting. After Luigi obtains the final Dark Moon piece in a parallel dimension accessed in the fifth mansion, King Boo intercepts him as he is being returned to the bunker. King Boo reveals to Luigi his intent to use the corrupted ghosts in conquering the world before battling him and being defeated once more.

When Luigi returns to his world, he frees Mario from the painting and reunites with E. Gadd and the Toads. They reassemble the Dark Moon, returning the ghosts back to their former selves. E. Gadd then releases the captured ghosts from their detainment in the bunker and they celebrate by taking a picture. The game ends as Luigi returns home with his newly adopted ghost dog, Polterpup. The credits show Mario, Luigi and the professor paying visits to Evershade Valley and spending time with the ghosts.

== Development ==
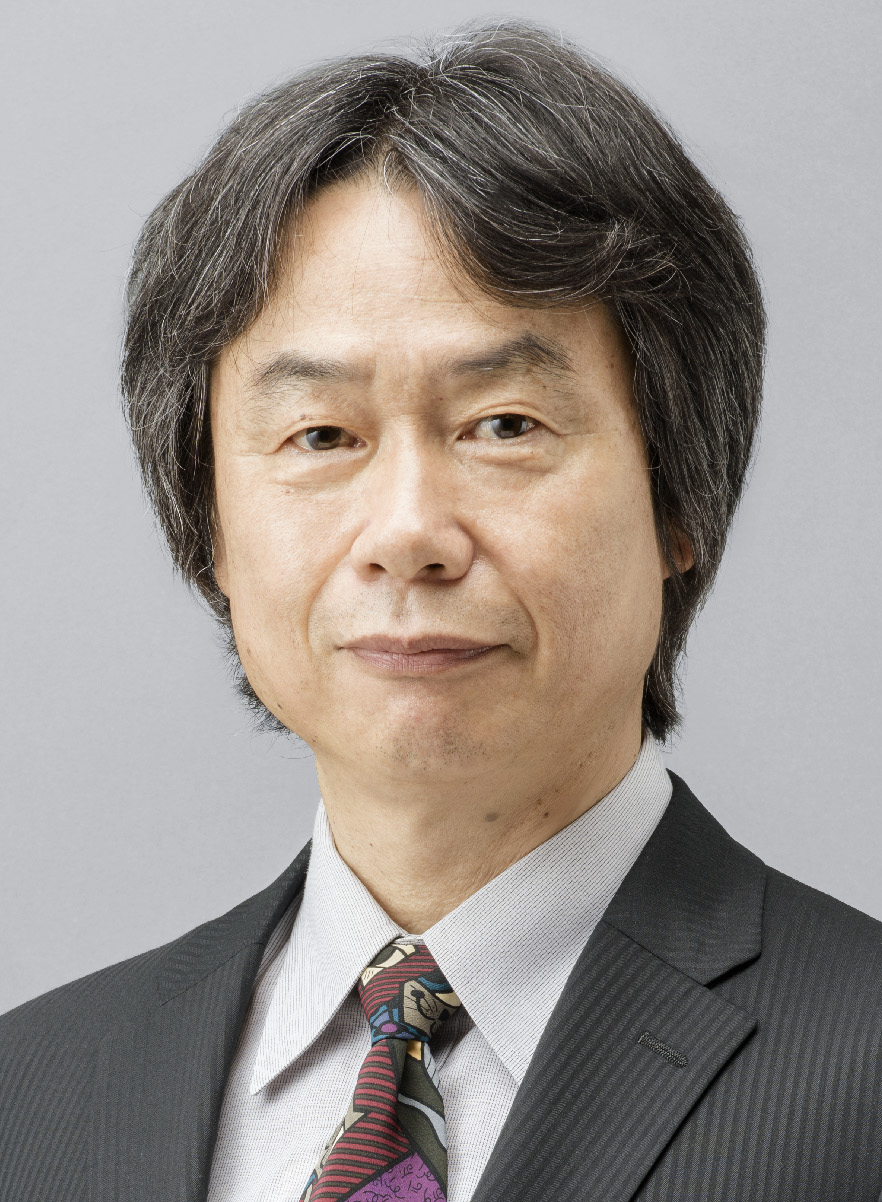
Shigeru Miyamoto, creator of the Mario franchise, reprised his role as a supervisor and producer.

Luigi's Mansion: Dark Moon was developed by Next Level Games, a Canadian developer who had previously worked on Nintendo-published titles Punch-Out!! for the Wii and the Mario Strikers series. Bryce Holliday served as the game's overall director and Chad York was the lead composer and audio director. Brian Davis was a lead programmer, primarily boss battles. Shigeru Miyamoto was a producer and creator for the original Luigi's Mansion, but for Dark Moon Miyamoto stayed hands-off and instead supervised the project. He compared his role to that of a shepherd, by which he let Next Level Games take control of most of the project, and rather than telling them what to do, he instead intervened when he felt they were going in the wrong direction. Due to location differences—Miyamoto in Japan and Next Level Games being located in Canada—Yoshihito Ikebata also served as a supervisor, who had previously worked on the Mario vs. Donkey Kong series, and transcluded info between both companies frequently. Ikebata would report updates to Miyamoto biweekly and would relay Miyamoto's opinions to Holliday. Ryuichi Nakada served as an assistant supervisor and performed similar tasks. Yoshikami Kuzuki also helped advise. According to Holliday, Miyamoto did a good job supervising and the project never lost focus. Development began in 2009 and was completed in 2012.

In 2002, hardware designer Hideki Konno approached Nintendo to conduct experiments on Luigi's Mansion with the addition of new glasses-free 3D hardware, which would have also been released for the GameCube. The project would have been the first instance of Nintendo using glasses-free 3D in their products and pre-dated the Nintendo 3DS by nine years. Nintendo was originally doubtful of the project due to the prior critical and commercial failure of the Virtual Boy. The concept had Konno revisit the GameCube hardware and make a new version that included a four-inch LCD screen for glasses-free 3D compatibility. They nicknamed the concept "dollhouse mode" because the 3D effects added a new layer of depth and made the graphics stand out more. The LCD concept was shown at E3 2002, titled Luigi's Mansion 3D, but Nintendo held back on revealing the 3D aspect. According to Konno, the concept could have been successful but was simply too expensive to manufacture; liquid crystal, what made LCD possible, was too expensive at the time. Players would have needed to purchase the LCD as an add-on accessory and the purchase would have most likely been more expensive than the GameCube itself and the project never surfaced.

In the years following, Nintendo continuously revisited the idea of a Luigi's Mansion sequel. Ikebata credited this to the Poltergust gameplay mechanics, which they felt were fun and satisfying to use and could also be exploited for puzzle design. Development for a successor to the Nintendo DS, the Nintendo 3DS, began in 2009. They realized that the Nintendo 3DS featured similar 3D hardware ability to that of their prototype on the GameCube, and they decided to officially develop a sequel with the 3D gameplay in mind.

Leading up to their involvement with Dark Moon, Next Level Games had worked with Kensuke Tanabe and his development team to release several sports video games, including Super Mario Strikers, its sequel, and Punch-Out!!, works that spanned from 2005 to 2009 and two video game consoles: GameCube and Wii. Prior to the development of Dark Moon Next Level Games was occupied with another undisclosed Nintendo-related project, which later was revealed to be a Metroid title with gameplay similar to the arcade game Gauntlet; the project was in its prototype phase and they planned on presenting the prototype in a video conference meeting. At the meeting, however, followed up by "something like a drumroll", Tanabe revealed they would instead be working on Dark Moon. According to York, everyone on the staff was excited about the change of plans, more so York, who was looking forward to making music for a non sports game title. Development officially began in 2009 and pre-dated the announcement of the Nintendo 3DS in 2010, meaning they were unaware of the hardware they were making the game for. During the conference, they were informed of the failed attempt to make Luigi's Mansion 3D in 2002, so they assumed the new hardware had something to do with 3D and designed a demo after a dollhouse concept, coincidentally similar to that of the one made for Luigi's Mansion.

"I think he's stated in his interviews that he really wanted to take over and get involved in Luigi's Mansion. And also I think that he's using this game as a platform to mentor other designers in Nintendo, including us. So by getting more face time with him you learn different things. It's twofold. He really wanted this franchise to come back strong, as well as get out there with the dev teams."

— Director Bryce Holliday on Miyamoto's involvement, 2013 Wired interview

Miyamoto visited Vancouver, Canada in two instances to discuss the project. According to Next Level Games, other video game companies were "hanging around" the company building after they became aware of Miyamoto's visit, and tried to use the Nintendo 3DS's StreetPass feature to share game data with him as he passed by. Holliday said that Miyamoto was very humble and evaluated game design well. They showed him a demo of the game's first boss battle and, to their surprise, he beat it very quickly and "tossed out comments right and left." Beyond the two summits, Miyamoto would consult with Next Level Games weekly and hold official meetings bi-weekly. Miyamoto would often be inspired by drama shows he would watch on the television for design ideas. He would consult with Ikebata on how each episode could be broken down into miniature stories that came full circle, a concept that was important with game design. At every conference meeting, Miyamoto would simply ask "So?" to begin with; he knew that the developers would anticipate this question and would pre-prepare an answer, therefore increasing focus. Development took over three years to complete, and a lot of time went into understanding the hardware they were developing for. According to the developers, the period was stressful; Ikebata felt the time went by "in a flash" due to the high levels of stress, Holliday said that he was "pulling his hair out" in the final year of development, and York even had two children within the time frame. Despite the layer of stress, Miyamoto continuously ensured that Next Level Games was enjoying the development process, and Holliday expressed that the team's atmosphere was continuously positive.

The development team's goal in making Dark Moon was to create a new experience different from that of Luigi's Mansion while also retaining the quality of the original title and what made it so memorable. They wanted to emphasize new gameplay elements whilst also appealing to veterans of the original game but also making sure it didn't overly rely on nostalgia; to do so they ensured they retained a similar atmosphere, which balanced "slight horror and slight humor". With this quality retained they were able to come up with new gameplay elements and features without straying too far from the original Luigi's Mansion concept.

=== Gameplay ===
Luigi's control scheme was built from scratch ten times over. The first few times Ikebata met with Next Level Games, they decided to try a new control set. When showing the new controls to Miyamoto, he would frequently ask to view the inside programming required to make the controls possible and they went back and forth between the two often. Miyamoto stated that the programming was something he was "personally involved with to a fair extent". The original game involved the player using both circle pad sticks to suck up a ghost, but this was deemed too inaccessible for new players and they switched to one instead. Circle Pad Pro functionality was never considered for similar reasons and was released too late into the development cycle to adequately incorporate it. To make up for the lack of depth they incorporated other Poltergust gimmicks to balance out the tactical strategy. With less focus on sucking up ghosts they were able to direct some of the gimmicks towards the level design, and they were made much more in-depth than the game before. The Strobulb feature was added to make catching ghosts more satisfying.

Roughly sixteen to eighteen months of the development time period were spent conceiving and prototyping gameplay ideas. Some ideas were oriented towards the Poltergust and others involved new gameplay concepts, such as a minigame that involved balloons or a sliding puzzle. Over a course of a year, Miyamoto would play through the game simply suggesting that it needed more content to increase length, which was one of the main struggles of the first game. In multiple instances over development, they felt that the game was complete, but they kept returning to past areas and coming up with more ideas for each of them, prolonging development time. A lot of ideas didn't make it to the final product, "maybe enough to make another game" according to Holliday, and most of the length increases came from the addition of multiplayer.

A multiplayer option was considered from the beginning of development. Konno informed the developers that multiplayer was planned for the first Luigi's Mansion that involved Luigi working alongside another Luigi but for various reasons was left out of the final product; he and Miyamoto encouraged them to include the mode in Dark Moon, though they were already set on including a multiplayer game mode in the first place. After they showed Miyamoto a demo of a multiplayer concept, he challenged them to make it have just as much replay value as the Mario Kart series to ensure it had high quality. They focused on making multiplayer a cooperative experience, and the progression would only be possible with the help of another player to continue progress, such as having one Luigi being trapped and the other one needing to save them. When one of the Luigi's is knocked out another can save him, which was incorporated to better emphasize cooperative play and the concept derived from the "Luigi's Ghost Mansion" minigame for the Wii U title Nintendo Land. They were given a 32 MB limit to allow for it to be downloadable, which altered some design choices.

=== Characters ===
"One of the first vision words that came in from Nintendo was this Japanese concept of 'karakuri,' which is these automaton dolls from the 18th century that move as if they were alive. They're actually made out of wood and mechanical parts. Karakuri, roughly translated, means 'surprise and delight.' So Nintendo and Miyamoto-san wanted us to build up the anticipation for the player to lead them into a gag, whether it was something funny or something scary. You constantly have this surprise and delight as you move around the mansions.

The existing set of characters that are in the game are probably a subset of a wide range of different characters that we tried out. Some didn't make it, wound up on the chopping block. It was a blast to use the Mario characters. We do keyframe animation, so it's a little bit more cartoony. Our animators had a blast doing things like the stretch and squash and finding new ways for the ghosts to scare Luigi. If you've been playing for a while, you might notice that the ghosts get scared by Luigi as well. It works both ways. They're both kind of hapless and goofy."

— Director Bryce Holliday describing character design and relationship, 2013 IGN interview

Next Level Games found Luigi to be more diverse in emotion than Mario, and therefore a more relatable character with more personality. Holliday described him as having an "underdog quality", and were able to use his layer of fear to tell a deeper story. Holliday compared Luigi's "hapless reluctant hero side" to that of the fictional character Mr. Bean; the developers watched a lot of the Mr. Bean television show to shape both Luigi's personality and humor. Miyamoto compared Luigi to a salad, considering that he was a more timid choice in comparison to Mario that helped balance out the horror aspect of the game. He also mentioned that numerous Nintendo employees were fans of Luigi and had been wanting to make a game starring him for a long time. Nintendo emphasized that Luigi should not be able to jump in Dark Moon, to retain similarities between the two games; the designers were unaware of why Nintendo chose to not let him jump in the first game, and Ikebata assumed it was because the game emphasized adventure and removing a jump feature took attention away from action elements. According to Next Levels games, Nintendo was strict on their intellectual property and even more so the characters, and Ikebata and Nakada were "gatekeepers" that enforced their rules. They attempted to push the limits of these boundaries but were usually kept from doing so. Luigi, as usual, was voiced by Charles Martinet; he performed the lines without any context of the game itself, so they used various forms of storyboards and art to show Martinet what situation Luigi was in and what emotion he should be expressing. Sometimes Martinet would act out Luigi physically just for fun and would also sometimes ad-lib.

Ikebata assured that the game should reprise Toad from the original. Toad was Davis' favorite character throughout development; he ensured that the character should have an emotional connection with Luigi and that he feels safer when he's with him. He was made to be an escort mission, and Davis was inspired by The Legend of Zelda: A Link to the Past when making them. Kazumi Totaka reprised the voice of E. Gadd from the original Luigi's Mansion. E. Gadd was made to be "as much a tinkerer as he is an inventor", which justified why he repurposed a Nintendo DS into a tool Luigi used in the game. The Polterpup became both Next Level Games' and Nintendo's favorite character while developing them, and ultimately expanded their role to be larger than intended.

Ghost designs were made with a cartoon-like animation and emphasized to not be taken seriously, and were used to the expense of gag jokes. The designers used key frame animation to bring out more cartoony expression and they often made the ghosts stretch in unnatural formations. Most ghost designs conceptualized made their way into the final product. They were made to act "boisterous" in situations where they think they are away from Luigi, and a lot of instances of cracks in the walls or corners of hallways were made so Luigi could look into these situations. Nakada suggested the artwork should emphasize this concept because it was used very frequently, which they agreed to do. A lot of character ideas surfaced from Next Level Games that parodied common ghost film tropes but Miyamoto requested they stay away from them. He emphasized Dark Moon being "its own unique world" and requested they think outside of the box often. For example, Holliday conceptualized a boss battle that was a plant, but Miyamoto called the idea "ordinary" and suggested a staircase be the boss battle instead. This was one of the only design elements Miyamoto worked hands-on for. Boss battles in general were designed to leave a memorable impact on the player; at one point Miyamoto had the designers scratch their original boss battle designs and rebuild them from the ground up due to a lack of character and not expressing the franchise well enough, though they were all in early phases and not much was lost. The developers declared this as an instance of Miyamoto "upending the tea table".

=== Graphics and worldbuilding ===
The game was split up in a level-like format to emphasize the on-the-go portability of the Nintendo 3DS, and each level was built to be about ten to twenty minutes in length and have something "satisfying" happen in each of them. They also used this executive decision to reimagine the same locations with new ideas. The developers knew that the open-world format would result in tedious backtracking, so they added new ideas or changed others in rooms that the player had already visited. They justified this by making it seem as if the ghosts have visited and messed with a room's interior. Next Level Games was taught the Japanese word "karakuri" from Ikebata, which roughly translates to "surprise and delight", and they used this as a philosophy for designing each location. To encourage exploration, they hid various secrets and other paranormal activities in the rooms. Miyamoto wanted the game to have a lot of value, so multiple area designs were included. This also allowed for near limitless creativity and the concept was exploited to include as many diverse locations as possible, such as a steam clock factory and a museum. The developers also emphasized Miyamoto's design philosophy of "going left", where the player should be rewarded for returning to old parts of the game. Although they were made to be relatively easy to find they made sure it would still be a challenge for those who were trying to fully complete the game; Ikebata himself struggled to find some of the collectibles and needed help from others. To make backtracking less repetitive they introduce the Dark-Light Device. The Dark-Light Device was originally going to be similar to an alternate reality, where the player could switch between the real world and a "spirit world" and see differences among them. They considered the concept, however, to be overplayed; they switched it to be singular items within the real world instead.

Next Level Games received a lot of positive feedback from players who played the Dark Moon demo at E3, and they found that 3D graphics helped make capturing ghosts easier. To make the 3D graphics a more comfortable experience they used a fixed camera perspective and keep the camera more static during cutscenes. For better ease of experience, the transition between the first and third perspectives was also slowed and important objects were kept within view of the player at all times. The first boss battle was designed to bring out the room's 3D depth. Throughout the development process, they continuously revisited the 3D graphics to understand and utilize them as effectively as possible.

== Marketing and release ==
Dark Moon was revealed at E3 2011 by Reggie Fils-Aimé, a day before the announcement of the Wii U. He mentioned that the game would be more than another Luigi's Mansion installment, and a trailer played that showed the concept of multiple mansions alongside other gameplay features. Further details were kept minimal and announced a vague 2012 release date. It was tentatively referred to as Luigi's Mansion 2. The following day Nintendo announced at a developer's conference that Next Level Games would be behind the title, which came as a surprise to some. When queried on why Nintendo was making a Luigi's Mansion sequel before another Pikmin entry, Miyamoto replied that "he wanted to" and had wanted to for a long time. Various booths to demo the game were available during the event for twenty-minute play sessions, and received positive first impressions from critics.

Further details were revealed at E3 2012, where gameplay footage was shown detailing new gameplay features and how the game functions with 3D graphics. It was renamed to Luigi's Mansion: Dark Moon and dated for a holiday release. Details, however, remained sparse. A demo kiosk was once again also available. Nintendo published a release schedule on August 13, 2012, which mentioned that Dark Moon would instead release in the "first half of 2013 in the Americas", while Professor Layton and the Miracle Mask and Paper Mario: Sticker Star proceeded to release on schedule. It was later announced via Twitter that the game would release within the first quarter of 2013. In January 2013, they revealed the game's multiplayer features. They also announced in January that the title would release March 24, alongside the reveal of the game's box artwork.

In a February Nintendo Direct presentation, Nintendo president and CEO Satoru Iwata—while wearing a replica of Luigi's cap—announced at 2013 would be declared the "Year of Luigi"; it was a year-long event that celebrated the 30th anniversary of Luigi, since his inception in Mario Bros. in 1983. According to Miyamoto, a decision was reached to create the event because of the new Luigi's Mansion and another game, Mario & Luigi: Dream Team, both nearing release and put emphasis on Luigi, so they began the celebration to see fit. He also believed that Luigi is underrepresented and neglected in Nintendo titles. An overview of Dark Moon gameplay was presented by Miyamoto in the Direct, alongside announcements of Dream Team and New Super Luigi U. Prior to the overview presentation Miyamoto and Iwata performed a skit where Miyamoto appeared with a real-life Poltergust. Iwata gave Miyamoto a Luigi cap, declared the two of them the "Luigi Brothers", and Miyamoto began the overview. The following March Nintendo made a Miiverse chatroom for Dark Moon; various Nintendo employees, such as Miyamoto, Takashi Tezuka, and Yoshihito Ikebata made posts on the chatroom. When York, Davis, and Holliday were interviewed by Iwata in an Iwata Asks interview that month, they all wore Luigi caps in spirit of the celebration. A promotional ad circulated in March that depicted a costumed character of Luigi using with the Poltergust in the real world, of which Nintendo partnered with iam8bit Productions to make and uploaded a video to their YouTube channel showing how the Poltergust was constructed. Luigi's Mansion: Dark Moon was released on March 20, 2013, in Japan, March 24 in North America, and March 28 in Europe. The following November the game was bundled with a Nintendo 3DS. In a December 18, 2013 European Nintendo Direct a collectible diorama themed after Dark Moon and the Year of Luigi was announced and released for the Club Nintendo website in Europe. It was available for purchase that day in Europe and available as a pre-order in North America with a release date in March. The diorama was sold out in North America and removed from the Club Nintendo Europe website within two weeks.

== Reception ==
=== Critical reviews ===
Reception

Aggregate scores
Aggregator	Score
Metacritic	(3DS) 86/100 (NS) 77/100
OpenCritic	67% recommend

Review scores
Publication	Score
4Players	90/100
Destructoid	9.5/10
Edge	8/10
Electronic Gaming Monthly	8.5/10
Eurogamer	9/10
Famitsu	9/10, 9/10, 8/10, 9/10
Game Informer	8.5/10
GameRevolution	4/5
GameSpot	6.5/10
GamesRadar+	4/5
GamesTM	9/10
GameTrailers	9.3/10
Giant Bomb	4/5
IGN	9.3/10
Joystiq	3.5/5
Nintendo Life	9/10
Official Nintendo Magazine	92%
Pocket Gamer	4.5/5
Polygon	7/10
VideoGamer.com	9/10

Luigi's Mansion: Dark Moon received "generally favorable reviews", receiving an 86/100 on review aggregator website Metacritic. IGN gave the game a 9.3 out of 10, citing that it was "Nintendo at its inventive best."

Matthew Castle of Official Nintendo Magazine gave it a 92%, praising the game's 3D visuals and mix of old and new features. However, he also criticized the game for its lack of checkpoints. He concluded on a positive note, stating "For as much as Luigi's Mansion 2 acts like the class clown, all shrieks and pratfalls, it has more heart than any game in recent memory when it isn't yanking them out of ghost chests, naturally. So man up Luigi and embrace your applause. Funny, gorgeous, crammed full of surprises... but enough about Luigi. Nintendo renovates one of its more oddball offerings into a must-have title. The only thing to fear is that it takes another 10 years to return." Conversely, Carolyn Petit of GameSpot gave it a 6.5 out of 10, citing "difficulty spikes and a lack of checkpoints", as well as the stiff controls, but praised the multiplayer functionality.

The visual presentation was widely lauded, with some considering the graphics to be the best yet seen on the 3DS, and Oli Welsh of Eurogamer proclaiming that it is "as close to a playable cartoon as anything since Zelda: The Wind Waker". Richard Mitchell of Joystiq and Petit deemed the atmospheric settings to be the game's strongest asset, with Petit observing that the game "perfectly captures the sort of genteel spookiness typified by Disneyland's Haunted Mansion attraction". The settings were compared to dioramas and ornate dollhouses, and the high amount of interactive elements that react to Luigi's vacuum were said to instill charm in the settings. The character animations, particularly Luigi's, were praised for their comedic value, with Welsh elaborating that "Every movement will make you smile, from his pot-bellied scamper when you hold down the run button to his tiptoed ghost-hunting stance, or the elaborate Stan Laurel set-ups for each scripted pratfall." The stereoscopic 3D effects were credited for significantly augmenting the game's visuals by granting added physicality and depth to the environmental details. Chris Carter of Destructoid singled out the ghosts as a visual highlight, but complained that the presentation of the menus was "decidedly cheap and non-Nintendo". Castle warned that players "may mourn the loss of the first game's gothic murk - spooks are more generic than the portrait ghosts".

Commentary on the audio was generally positive. The music was described as "gently foreboding" and "delightfully spooky", with Welsh attributing a Scooby-Doo-like quality, and Mitchell remarking that it "skews much closer to Alfred Hitchcock than Akira Yamaoka". Welsh commended Martinet's vocalizations, and reviewers cited Luigi's tremulous idle humming along to the background music as an endearing trait. While Tim Turi of Game Informer affectionately likened E. Gadd's unintelligible prattling to "a lovable Ewok", Kevin Schaller of GameRevolution was sometimes annoyed by his manner of speech, which he referred to as "Nintendo's version of Simlish". Apart from this, Schaller acknowledged the music as occasionally eerie and the sounds effects as convincingly fitting.

=== Sales ===
Luigi's Mansion debuted to high sales in the U.S.; selling 415,000 copies in the country by mid-April, it became the sixth bestselling game of the month in only a week's time in March, behind Call of Duty: Black Ops 2. 365,000 of which were physical and the rest were digital downloads. By mid-July, sales totalled over 750,000 units. In the United Kingdom, Luigi's Mansion: Dark Moon charted fifth in the All Formats chart, a position it held for three consecutive weeks, becoming the first 3DS exclusive title of the year to chart. It continued to remain within the top ten charts until mid-May. The game was the number-one bestseller in Japan for three weeks in a row, totalling 459,000 by April 7 and 68,423 were from the week prior, ahead of Animal Crossing: New Leaf. Sales tracker Media Create reported that the game had sold over eighty percent of its shipment in its debut week. According to Nintendo of America's senior product marketing director Bill Trinen, the successful launches of Dark Moon and Pokémon Mystery Dungeon: Gates to Infinity helped push 3DS sales up 50 percent to a total of 20 million, and expected that 3DS sales would "really take off" in 2013. Within its first week, worldwide sales reached over 1 million, and by the end of October, 3.13 million. As of December 31, 2020, the game has sold 6.44 million copies worldwide and is the twelfth-bestselling game on the 3DS.

=== Awards and nominations ===
Prior to release, Dark Moon was nominated for Best Handheld game by the Game Critics Awards, but lost to Queasy Games's Sound Shapes. Throughout 2013 and 2014 the game was nominated at various game award ceremonies primarily in handheld game categories, but lost all nominations to various other titles, including others developed by Nintendo. At the NAVGTR Awards, the game was nominated in categories for its animation and control design, but lost to The Walking Dead: 400 Days and the critically acclaimed The Last of Us respectively. Various news sites considered Dark Moon to be among the best video games of 2013, including IGN, USGamer, VentureBeat, and Eurogamer.

Year	Award ceremony	Category	Result	Ref(s).
2012	Game Developers Choice Awards	Best Handheld Game	Nominated	
2013	Golden Joystick Awards	Best Handheld Game	Nominated	
2013	British Academy Children's Awards	Game of 2013	Nominated	
2014	17th Annual D.I.C.E. Awards	Handheld Game of the Year	Nominated	
2014	Game Developers Choice Awards	Best Handheld/Mobile Game	Nominated	
2014	NAVGTR Awards	Animation, Interactive	Nominated	
2014	NAVGTR Awards	Control Design, 3D	Nominated	
2014	Canadian Videogame Awards 2014	Best Game on the Go	Won	

== Legacy ==
In retrospective rankings ranging from 2015 to 2023, VG247, GamesRadar+, Eurogamer, and IGN considered Dark Moon to be one of the best games on the Nintendo 3DS. After the release of Dark Moon, Next Level Games decided to work with Nintendo exclusively and, after the release of Luigi's Mansion 3, were acquired by Nintendo altogether. Nintendo acquired the company to increase communication opportunities, in hopes that it would "facilitate an anticipated improvement in development speed and quality".

=== Luigi's Mansion 2 HD ===
Luigi's Mansion 2 HD
- Nintendo Switch box art cover
- Developer: Tantalus Media
- Publisher: Nintendo
- Series: Luigi's Mansion
- Platform: Nintendo Switch
- Release: June 27, 2024

Luigi's Mansion 2 HD, a remaster of the original game for the Nintendo Switch was released on June 27, 2024. First revealed in a June 2023 Nintendo Direct with a 2024, the game features remastered graphics in high definition video (HD).

The remaster was developed by Tantalus Media, who had previously worked on an HD remaster of The Legend of Zelda: Skyward Sword in 2021. Beyond an HD update of the base game, various visuals were improved upon, such as reflective surfaces and more intricate details of textures. Minor movement adjustments were made to make, and due to the lack of stereoscopic 3D function on the Nintendo Switch, the feature does not exist. Luigi's Mansion 2 HD performed well commercially, topping the charts in Japan and the UK in its first week of release. It sold 1.19 million copies within its first four days. It sold under 400,000 copies in the following quarter, having 1.59 million sales as of November 2024.

The game received "generally favorable reviews" from critics, receiving a score of 77/100 on review aggregator website Metacritic. Fellow review aggregator OpenCritic assessed that the game received strong approval, being recommended by 67% of critics. Its graphical improvements were praised—Nintendo World Report considered it Nintendo's best remaster— but criticized for the little update beyond that, considering that the game was built for a less powerful console and had some issues in the transition. TechRader noted noticeably dark environments and jagged edges that worked for the Nintendo 3DS, but could not be ignored on the Nintendo Switch, and Siliconera argued that the mission-based structure does not work as well on the new console.

=== Luigi's Mansion Arcade ===
Luigi's Mansion Arcade is an arcade cabinet developed by Capcom, other involvement by Sega, and licensed by Nintendo, and based on the contents of Dark Moon. Capcom ran a temporary location test of the cabinet in an arcade from October 30, 2014, to November 3, 2014. The cabinet was formally revealed by SEGA in 2015 and was available for play sessions at the 2015 Japan Amusement Expo. Following a trailer and promotional website from Capcom, cabinets debuted in Japan in summer of 2015. The first North American cabinet was placed in a Dave & Buster's at Addison, Illinois, on October 9, 2015, and other western Dave & Buster's locations received one throughout the following year. It is titled Luigi Mansion Arcade in Japan and Luigi's Mansion Arcade in North America.

The exterior and interior of the machine are decorated with panel art from both Luigi's Mansion and Dark Moon, and contain two sets of to-scale Poltergusts, and the players use the Poltergust's vacuum nozzle as a controller. It is an enclosed, sit-down cabinet, and the players view a screen from a first-person perspective; gameplay is an on-rails light gun shooter. The players have a choice of beginning the game or receiving a tutorial from E. Gadd first, who gives an overview of the Poltergust's features. Ghosts come in waves within Dark Moon locations, and the player must push a button on the Poltergust to stun them and hold a trigger to suck them in. Prompts on the screen dictate how the player needs to move the Poltergust around in order to suck ghosts in successfully, or they will escape otherwise. The players can also use a smart bomb to clear a large wave of ghosts at once, and the Poltergust can suck in coins and other objects to increase the player's score. The game is linear and level-based, and difficulty increases drastically as the players progress. The cabinet supports one or two players at a time.
