= Mario Strikers: Battle League =

2022 video game

- Home menu icon
- Developer: Next Level Games
- Publisher: Nintendo
- Director: Devon Blanchet
- Designers: Diego R. Pons; Jeffrie Wu; Mike Levesque
- Composers: Chad York; Darren Radtke
- Series: Mario Strikers
- Platform: Nintendo Switch
- Release: June 10, 2022
- Genre: Sports
- Modes: Single-player, multiplayer

Mario Strikers: Battle League (Note: Japanese: マリオストライカーズバトルリーグ, Hepburn: Mario Sutoraikāzu Batoru Rīgu) (Note: known in Europe, Australia and Saudi Arabia as Mario Strikers: Battle League Football) is a 2022 sports video game developed by Next Level Games and published by Nintendo for the Nintendo Switch console. It was released worldwide on June 10, 2022. It is the third game in the Mario Strikers series, which is part of the larger Mario franchise.

The game received mixed reviews, with critics praising its gameplay mechanics, multiplayer, and presentation, though it received criticism for its small character roster at launch and limited single player content.

== Gameplay ==
Mario Strikers: Battle League is a five versus five association football/soccer video game. The game shies away from realism, in favor of chaotic, over-the-top gameplay. The game maintains the main premise of the sport, where players maneuver players around a field in efforts to pass and shoot a ball into a goal to score points, with the team with the most points at the end of a game winning the game. However, the game takes many liberties with the sport. Aggressive tackles and attacks are completely allowed, though they give the opposing player "items" to use at their disposal. Items often function in the same way as Mario Kart or Mario Tennis - banana peels can be placed on the field and characters will slip on them, while shells can be shot at characters to temporarily knock them over. No "out of bounds" exists on the field, instead, an electric fence is placed around the field; players can check and knock opponents into this fence to stun them. Additionally, collecting a glowing orb that appears on the field allows the player to perform a "Hyper Strike" and score a 2-point goal if the move is charged up without interruption.

In the game, the player picks a major Mario franchise character like Mario or Princess Peach - and a team of three other characters to round out the rest of the team. All characters have various strengths and weaknesses, and Battle League additionally allows for the customization of equipment on characters as well, affecting character's stats for things like speed, strength, and pass accuracy.

Up to eight players can play local multiplayer matches, with players using just one Joy-Con each, allowing for four versus four game, with the computer handling goalkeeping. Online multiplayer is also available, including a "Club Mode" where groups of up to 20 players can create their own game season, with leaderboards tracking scores.

== Development ==
The game was first announced during a Nintendo Direct on February 9, 2022. It is the third entry in the series, and the first new entry in almost 15 years, following a lengthy gap in releases after Super Mario Strikers (2005) for the GameCube and Mario Strikers Charged (2007) for the Wii. The game was developed by Next Level Games.

== Reception ==
Reception

Aggregate scores
Aggregator	Score
Metacritic	73/100
OpenCritic	49% recommend

Review scores
Publication	Score
Destructoid	8/10
Game Informer	7.5/10
GameRevolution	6/10
GameSpot	7/10
GamesRadar+	2.5/5
HobbyConsolas	87/100
IGN	8/10
Jeuxvideo.com	16/20
Nintendo Life	9/10
Shacknews	7/10
The Games Machine (Italy)	9/10
VG247	4/5

Mario Strikers: Battle League received "mixed or average" reviews according to review aggregator website Metacritic. Fellow review aggregator OpenCritic assessed that the game received fair approval, being recommended by 49% of critics.

Destructoid praised the game's balance between maintaining depth while still remaining accessible for more casual players, and further praised the longevity added through the online and local co-op modes. Game Informer wrote favorably on the customization present in the Strikers Club mode and criticized the AI on harder difficulties for being inconsistent and frustrating to contend with. GameSpot liked Battle League's technically complex mechanics, visual personality, game-balancing Hyper Shots, and the Striker Club's sense of personalization, but took issue with imperceptible gear system upgrades and overwhelming tutorials. GamesRadar+ lauded the game's personality but disliked the limitations of the gameplay's realistic elements, the field's lack of visual clarity, and the static nature of the stages. IGN praised the addition of the online mode, saying, "the leap forward in supporting a competitive landscape is a massively unexpected delight," but criticized the lack of innovation upon prior entries. Nintendo Life gave Battle League 9 stars out of 10 and called it "a masterclass in competitive game design" while heavily lauding the core gameplay and the title's accessibility, depth, and visuals. Shacknews similarly gave praise to the game but lamented the disappointing unlockables, small character roster, and the regressive nature of mechanics that had carried over from prior entries.

However, it was criticized for its lack of content upon release. Destructoid found the game more suitable for those who were able to easily participate in local multiplayer matches, writing, "The core loop is great, but confirmed solo players should keep an eye on post-launch content and keep this in mind before picking up the game early." GameRevolution called the lack of 4 vs 4 online matches a "glaring omission" and deemed the single-player modes "woefully undercooked" while expressing discontent over the lack of variety between matches. GameSpot and GamesRadar+ called Battle League a "slim" and a "thin" package, respectively, with GamesRadar+ in particular noting that, "The game mechanics don't change, it doesn't alter how you play, and 95% of the time you can't even see the Stadium you've chosen because you're looking solely at the pitch via a top-down perspective." IGN thought similarly, stating, "If you've played any games in the series before, there won't be many surprises in store for you and the small roster of characters and game modes is definitely disappointing..." Shacknews thought Battle League was "merely an average Sunday game that's playing on Univision: good for a few hours of entertainment and little more than that."

Despite the mixed reception, the Academy of Interactive Arts & Sciences nominated Mario Strikers: Battle League for "Sports Game of the Year" during the 26th Annual D.I.C.E. Awards.

=== Sales ===
Mario Strikers: Battle League sold 32,173 copies within its first week of release in Japan, making it the second bestselling retail game of the week in the country. As of March 2023 the game has sold 2.54 million copies worldwide.
