= List of sports video games featuring Mario =

There have been numerous sports games featuring Mario characters, based, among others, on tennis, golf, baseball, soccer, and various sports featured in the Olympic Games.

The Mario Kart and F1 series are not included in this list.

== Tennis games ==
While Mario appeared in Tennis as a chair umpire, he first starred as a player in the Virtual Boy game Mario's Tennis, developed by Nintendo R&D1. Like the Mario Golf series, the games have been developed by Camelot Software Planning since the Nintendo 64 instalment.

Game	Details
Tennis Original release date(s): JP: January 14, 1984; NA: October 18, 1985; PAL: September 1, 1986	Release years by system: 1984 — NES; 1984 — Arcade (as Vs. Tennis); 1985 — PC-88; 1985 — Sharp X1; 1985 — MZ-1500; 1986 — PlayChoice-10; 1986 — Famicom Disk System; 1989 — Game Boy; 2001 — GameCube (NES version); 2006 — Wii Virtual Console (NES version); 2011 — 3DS Virtual Console (Game Boy version); 2013 — Wii U Virtual Console (NES version); 2018 — Nintendo Classics (NES version)
Tennis Original release date(s): JP: January 14, 1984; NA: October 18, 1985; PAL: September 1, 1986	Notes: Mario is the chair umpire.
Mario's Tennis Original release date(s): JP: July 21, 1995; NA: August 14, 1995	Release years by system: 1995 — Virtual Boy; 2026 — Nintendo Classics
Mario's Tennis Original release date(s): JP: July 21, 1995; NA: August 14, 1995	Notes: Released in stereoscopic 3D.
Mario Tennis Original release date(s): JP: July 21, 2000; NA: August 28, 2000; PAL: November 3, 2000	Release years by system: 2000 — Nintendo 64; 2010 — Wii Virtual Console; 2021 — Nintendo Classics
Mario Tennis Original release date(s): JP: July 21, 2000; NA: August 28, 2000; PAL: November 3, 2000	Notes: This marks the first appearance of Waluigi. Characters from the Game Boy Color version of Mario Tennis can be uploaded to the Nintendo 64 version via Transfer Pak connectivity.
Mario Tennis Original release date(s): JP: November 1, 2000; NA: January 16, 2001; PAL: February 2, 2001	Release years by system: 2000 — Game Boy Color; 2013 — 3DS Virtual Console; 2024 — Nintendo Classics
Mario Tennis Original release date(s): JP: November 1, 2000; NA: January 16, 2001; PAL: February 2, 2001	Notes: The Game Boy Color version is the first game in the series to feature a story mode. Characters from the Game Boy Color version can be uploaded to the Nintendo 64 version via Transfer Pak connectivity.
Mario Power Tennis Original release date(s): JP: October 28, 2004; NA: November 8, 2004; PAL: February 25, 2005	Release years by system: 2004 — GameCube; 2009 — Wii
Mario Power Tennis Original release date(s): JP: October 28, 2004; NA: November 8, 2004; PAL: February 25, 2005	Notes: Re-released as part of Wii's New Play Control! game lineup.
Mario Tennis: Power Tour Original release date(s): JP: September 13, 2005; EU: November 18, 2005; AU: December 1, 2005; NA: December 5, 2005	Release years by system: 2005 — Game Boy Advance; 2014 — Wii U Virtual Console
Mario Tennis Open Original release date(s): NA: May 20, 2012; JP/AU: May 24, 2012; EU: May 25, 2012	Release years by system: 2012 — Nintendo 3DS
Mario Tennis: Ultra Smash Original release date(s): NA: November 20, 2015; EU: November 20, 2015; AU: November 21, 2015; JP: January 28, 2016	Release years by system: 2015 — Wii U
Mario Tennis Aces Original release date(s): WW: June 22, 2018	Release years by system: 2018 — Nintendo Switch
Mario Tennis Fever Original release date(s): WW: February 12, 2026	Release years by system: 2026 — Nintendo Switch 2

== Golf games ==
As with tennis, Mario appeared in multiple golf games before appearing in a Mario-branded entry on the Nintendo 64. Golf was the first sports game to feature Mario as a player. The series is currently developed by Camelot Software Planning.

Game	Details
Golf Original release date: JP: May 1, 1984; NA: October 18, 1985; PAL: November 15, 1986	Release years by system: 1984 — NES; 1984 — Arcade (as Vs. Golf); 1985 — PC-88; 1985 — Sharp X1; 1986 — PlayChoice-10; 1986 — Famicom Disk System; 1990 — Game Boy; 2001 — GameCube (NES version); 2006 — Wii Virtual Console (NES version); 2011 — 3DS Virtual Console (Game Boy version); 2013 — Wii U Virtual Console (NES version); 2024 — Nintendo Classics (NES version)
Golf Original release date: JP: May 1, 1984; NA: October 18, 1985; PAL: November 15, 1986	Notes: Features Mario as the player character.
Family Computer Golf: Japan Course Original release date(s): JP: February 21, 1987	Release years by system: 1987 — Family Computer Disk System
Family Computer Golf: Japan Course Original release date(s): JP: February 21, 1987	Notes: Features Mario as the player character
Family Computer Golf: US Course Original release date(s): JP: June 14, 1987	Release years by system: 1987 — Family Computer Disk System
Family Computer Golf: US Course Original release date(s): JP: June 14, 1987	Notes: Features Mario as the player character
NES Open Tournament Golf Original release dates: JP: September 20, 1991; NA: September 29, 1991; EU: June 18, 1992	Release years by system: 1991 — Family Computer Disk System; 1991 — Nintendo Entertainment System; 1991 — PlayChoice-10; 2007 — Wii Virtual Console; 2011 — 3DS Virtual Console; 2018 — Nintendo Classics
NES Open Tournament Golf Original release dates: JP: September 20, 1991; NA: September 29, 1991; EU: June 18, 1992	Notes: Known in Japan as Mario Open Golf.
Mario Golf Original release dates: JP: June 11, 1999; NA: June 30, 1999; PAL: September 14, 1999	Release years by system: 1999 — Nintendo 64; 2008 — Wii Virtual Console; 2022 — Nintendo Classics
Mario Golf Original release dates: JP: June 11, 1999; NA: June 30, 1999; PAL: September 14, 1999	Notes: Characters from the Game Boy Color version of Mario Golf can be uploaded to the Nintendo 64 version via Transfer Pak connectivity.
Mario Golf Original release dates: JP: August 10, 1999; NA: October 5, 1999; PAL: October 26, 1999	Release years by system: 1999 — Game Boy Color; 2012 — 3DS Virtual Console; 2024 — Nintendo Classics
Mario Golf Original release dates: JP: August 10, 1999; NA: October 5, 1999; PAL: October 26, 1999	Notes: Characters from the Game Boy Color version of Mario Golf can be uploaded to the Nintendo 64 version via Transfer Pak connectivity.
Mobile Golf Original release date: JP: May 11, 2001	Release years by system: 2001 — Game Boy Color
Mobile Golf Original release date: JP: May 11, 2001	Notes: Mobile Golf featured compatibility with the Mobile Adapter GB, allowing players to compete in multiplayer matches and unlock additional characters, courses, and clubs. A fan translation that restored the downloadable content was released in 2021.
Mario Golf: Toadstool Tour Original release date: NA: July 29, 2003; JP: September 5, 2003; AU: February 11, 2004; EU: June 18, 2004	Release years by system: 2003 — GameCube
Mario Golf: Toadstool Tour Original release date: NA: July 29, 2003; JP: September 5, 2003; AU: February 11, 2004; EU: June 18, 2004	Notes: Similar to the N64 and GBC Mario Golf games, Toadstool Tour and Advance Tour can exchange data using the GameCube – Game Boy Advance link cable.
Mario Golf: Advance Tour Original release date(s): JP: April 22, 2004; NA: June 22, 2004; AU: July 8, 2004; EU: September 17, 2004	Release years by system: 2004 — Game Boy Advance; 2014 — Wii U Virtual Console
Mario Golf: Advance Tour Original release date(s): JP: April 22, 2004; NA: June 22, 2004; AU: July 8, 2004; EU: September 17, 2004	Notes: Similar to the N64 and GBC Mario Golf games, Toadstool Tour and Advance Tour can exchange data using the GameCube – Game Boy Advance link cable.
Mario Golf: World Tour Original release date(s): JP: May 1, 2014; NA/EU: May 2, 2014; AU: May 3, 2014	Release years by system: 2014 — Nintendo 3DS
Mario Golf: Super Rush Original release date(s): WW: June 25, 2021	Release years by system: 2021 — Nintendo Switch

== Baseball games ==
Mario has appeared in multiple baseball video games. The last two titles were developed by Bandai Namco Entertainment.

Game	Details
Baseball Original release date(s): JP: December 7, 1983; NA: October 18, 1985; PAL: September 1, 1986	Release years by system: 1983 — NES; 1984 — Arcade (as Vs. Baseball); 1986 — PlayChoice-10; 1986 — Famicom Disk System; 1989 — Game Boy (Mario first appeared in 1989 Game Boy version of Baseball game); 2001 — GameCube (NES version); 2006 — Wii Virtual Console (NES version); 2011 — 3DS Virtual Console (Game Boy version); 2013 — Wii U Virtual Console (NES version); 2018 — Nintendo Classics (NES version); 2020 — Nintendo Switch (arcade version); 2024 — Nintendo Classics (Game Boy version)
Baseball Original release date(s): JP: December 7, 1983; NA: October 18, 1985; PAL: September 1, 1986	Notes: In the Game Boy version, Mario and Luigi are pitchers for the Bears and Eagles teams respectively.
Mario Superstar Baseball Original release date(s): JP/EU: July 21, 2005; NA: August 29, 2005	Release years by system: 2005 — GameCube
Mario Superstar Baseball Original release date(s): JP/EU: July 21, 2005; NA: August 29, 2005	Notes: Known in Japan as Super Mario Stadium Miracle Baseball. (Note: Japanese: スーパーマリオスタジアム ミラクルベースボール)
Mario Super Sluggers Original release date(s): JP: June 19, 2008; NA: August 25, 2008	Release years by system: 2008 — Wii; 2016 — Wii U Virtual Console
Mario Super Sluggers Original release date(s): JP: June 19, 2008; NA: August 25, 2008	Notes: Known in Japan as Super Mario Stadium Family Baseball. (Note: Japanese: スーパーマリオスタジアム ファミリーベースボール)

== Mario Strikers series ==
Mario Strikers (Mario Football in PAL regions and Mario Soccer in South Korea) is a series of association football video games that take place in the Mushroom Kingdom. All entries are developed by Next Level Games.

Game	Details
Super Mario Strikers Original release date(s): EU: November 18, 2005; NA: December 5, 2005; JP: January 11, 2006; AU: April 6, 2006	Release years by system: 2005 — GameCube; 2025 — Nintendo Classics
Super Mario Strikers Original release date(s): EU: November 18, 2005; NA: December 5, 2005; JP: January 11, 2006; AU: April 6, 2006	Notes: Known as Mario Smash Football in Europe and Australia.
Mario Strikers Charged Original release date(s): EU: May 25, 2007; AU: June 7, 2007; NA: July 30, 2007; JP: September 20, 2007	Release years by system: 2007 — Wii
Mario Strikers Charged Original release date(s): EU: May 25, 2007; AU: June 7, 2007; NA: July 30, 2007; JP: September 20, 2007	Notes: Known as Mario Strikers Charged Football in Europe and Australia, and as Mario Power Soccer in South Korea.
Mario Strikers: Battle League Original release date(s): WW: June 10, 2022	Release years by system: 2022 — Nintendo Switch
Mario Strikers: Battle League Original release date(s): WW: June 10, 2022	Notes: Announced during a Nintendo Direct presentation on February 9, 2022. Known as Mario Strikers: Battle League Football in Europe and Australia.

== Mario & Sonic at the Olympic Games series ==
The Mario & Sonic at the Olympic Games series is a collection of games that take place during the Summer and Winter Olympic Games, crossing over characters from the Mario series with those from Sega's Sonic the Hedgehog franchise. It debuted in 2007 for the Wii with the Beijing 2008 edition, titled Mario & Sonic at the Olympic Games. Nintendo published the East Asian versions of the first three games and fully published the fourth and fifth games, while Sega published the Western versions of the first three games and fully published the sixth game, with Nintendo licensing characters. The International Olympic Committee (IOC) allowed the licensing deal to lapse in 2020, effectively ending the series.

=== Summer Olympic Games ===
Game	Details
Mario & Sonic at the Olympic Games Original release date(s): Wii: NA: November 6, 2007; JP: November 22, 2007; PAL: November 23, 2007; Nintendo DS: JP: January 17, 2008; NA: January 22, 2008; AU: February 7, 2008; EU: February 8, 2008	Release years by system: 2007 — Wii; 2008 — Nintendo DS
Mario & Sonic at the London 2012 Olympic Games Original release date(s): Wii: NA: November 15, 2011; AU: November 17, 2011; EU: November 18, 2011; JP: December 8, 2011; Nintendo 3DS: EU: February 9, 2012; AU: February 10, 2012; NA: February 14, 2012; JP: March 1, 2012	Release years by system: 2011 — Wii; 2012 — Nintendo 3DS
Mario & Sonic at the Rio 2016 Olympic Games Original release date(s): Arcade: WW: February 2016; Nintendo 3DS: JP: February 18, 2016; NA: March 18, 2016; EU: April 8, 2016; AU: April 9, 2016; Wii U: JP: June 23, 2016; NA/EU: June 24, 2016; AU: June 25, 2016	Release years by system: 2016 — Wii U, Nintendo 3DS, Arcade
Mario & Sonic at the Olympic Games Tokyo 2020 Original release date(s): Nintendo Switch: JP: November 1, 2019; NA: November 5, 2019; PAL: November 8, 2019; Arcade: WW: 2020	Release years by system: 2019 — Nintendo Switch; 2020 — Arcade
Mario & Sonic at the Olympic Games Tokyo 2020 Original release date(s): Nintendo Switch: JP: November 1, 2019; NA: November 5, 2019; PAL: November 8, 2019; Arcade: WW: 2020	Notes: The last known game overall with work by AlphaDream before the company declared bankruptcy in 2019. The final game in the series before the Olympics license expired.

=== Winter Olympic Games ===
Game	Details
Mario & Sonic at the Olympic Winter Games Original release date(s): NA: October 13, 2009; EU: October 15, 2009; AU: October 16, 2009; JP: November 5, 2009	Release years by system: 2009 — Wii, Nintendo DS
Mario & Sonic at the Sochi 2014 Olympic Winter Games Original release date(s): EU: November 8, 2013; AU: November 9, 2013; NA: November 15, 2013; JP: December 5, 2013	Release years by system: 2013 — Wii U
Mario & Sonic at the Sochi 2014 Olympic Winter Games Original release date(s): EU: November 8, 2013; AU: November 9, 2013; NA: November 15, 2013; JP: December 5, 2013	Notes: Developed by Marvelous AQL with Sega. The first game in the series to not be released on a portable console and last known game overall of the Winter Olympics before the discontinuation of the Wii U in 2017.

== Mario Sports series ==
Game	Details
Mario Sports Mix Original release date(s): JP: November 25, 2010; AU: January 27, 2011; EU: January 28, 2011; UK: February 4, 2011; NA: February 7, 2011	Release years by system: 2010 — Wii
Mario Sports Mix Original release date(s): JP: November 25, 2010; AU: January 27, 2011; EU: January 28, 2011; UK: February 4, 2011; NA: February 7, 2011	Notes: First game to have dodgeball in a Mario game. It is also the first game to have volleyball in a Mario game outside of a Mario Party title.
Mario Sports Superstars Original release date(s): JP: March 30, 2017; NA: March 24, 2017; EU: March 10, 2017; AU: March 11, 2017	Release years by system: 2017 — Nintendo 3DS
Mario Sports Superstars Original release date(s): JP: March 30, 2017; NA: March 24, 2017; EU: March 10, 2017; AU: March 11, 2017	Notes: This is the first Mario sports game to feature horse racing.

== Basketball games ==
Game	Details
NBA Street V3 Original release date(s): JP: March 24, 2005; NA: February 8, 2005; AU: October 26, 2005; EU: February 18, 2005	Release years by system: 2005 — GameCube; 2005 — PlayStation 2; 2005 — Xbox
NBA Street V3 Original release date(s): JP: March 24, 2005; NA: February 8, 2005; AU: October 26, 2005; EU: February 18, 2005	Notes: Mario, Luigi, and Peach, as unlockable characters, appear exclusively in the GameCube version of the game.
Mario Hoops 3-on-3 Original release date(s): JP: July 27, 2006; NA: September 11, 2006; EU: February 16, 2007	Release years by system: 2006 — Nintendo DS
Mario Hoops 3-on-3 Original release date(s): JP: July 27, 2006; NA: September 11, 2006; EU: February 16, 2007	Notes: The first Mario-branded basketball game outside of a Mario Party title. Known as Mario Slam Basketball in Europe.

== Pinball games ==
Game	Details
Pinball Original release date(s): JP: February 2, 1984; NA: October 18, 1985; EU: September 1, 1986	Release years by system: 1984 — Nintendo Entertainment System; 1984 — Arcade; 1989 — Family Computer Disk System; 2022 — Nintendo Classics
Pinball Original release date(s): JP: February 2, 1984; NA: October 18, 1985; EU: September 1, 1986	Notes: A Mario-themed pinball game developed by Nintendo Research & Development 1 and HAL Laboratory, and released by Nintendo.
Mario Pinball Land Original release date(s): JP: August 26, 2004; NA: October 4, 2004; PAL: November 26 2004	Release years by system: 2004 — Game Boy Advance
Mario Pinball Land Original release date(s): JP: August 26, 2004; NA: October 4, 2004; PAL: November 26 2004	Notes: A Mario-themed pinball game developed by Fuse Games and released by Nintendo.

== Stunt sports ==
Game	Details
Excitebike: Bun Bun Mario Battle Stadium Original release date(s): JP: May 11, 1997	Release years by system: 1997 — Satellaview
Excitebike: Bun Bun Mario Battle Stadium Original release date(s): JP: May 11, 1997	Notes: A Mario-themed variant of Excitebike released in four installments through Satellaview.
SSX on Tour Original release date(s): NA: October 11, 2005; EU: October 21, 2005; AU: October 27, 2005; JP: November 3, 2005	Release years by system: 2005 — GameCube, PlayStation 2, Xbox, PlayStation Portable
SSX on Tour Original release date(s): NA: October 11, 2005; EU: October 21, 2005; AU: October 27, 2005; JP: November 3, 2005	Notes: The GameCube version features cameo appearances by Mario, Luigi, and Peach as playable characters. The Mario characters were exclusive to Nintendo's platform.

== Dancing ==
Game	Details
Dance Dance Revolution: Mario Mix Original release date(s): JP: July 14, 2005; NA: October 24, 2005; EU: October 28, 2005; AU: November 24, 2005	Release years by system: 2005 — GameCube
Dance Dance Revolution: Mario Mix Original release date(s): JP: July 14, 2005; NA: October 24, 2005; EU: October 28, 2005; AU: November 24, 2005	Notes: The only entry in the Dance Dance Revolution featuring Mario. Known as Dancing Stage Mario Mix in Europe.
