= Super Mario Strikers =

2005 video game

- North American box art
- Developer: Next Level Games
- Publisher: Nintendo
- Director: Mike Inglehart
- Producers: Justin Dowdeswell; Ken Yeeloy; Kensuke Tanabe
- Designer: Brandon Gill
- Programmer: David Catlin
- Artist: Cassidy Scott
- Composers: Graig Robertson; Kyle Nordman
- Series: Mario Strikers
- Platform: GameCube
- Release: EU: November 18, 2005; NA: December 5, 2005; JP: January 19, 2006; AU: April 6, 2006
- Genre: Sports
- Modes: Single-player, multiplayer

Super Mario Strikers (Note: Japanese: スーパーマリオストライカーズ, Hepburn: Sūpā Mario Sutoraikāzu) (released in Europe and Australia as Mario Smash Football), is a 2005 sports video game developed by Next Level Games and published by Nintendo for the GameCube. The game was released in Europe on November 18, 2005, North America on December 5, 2005, Japan on January 19, 2006, and Australia on April 6, 2006. The game's developers had worked on NHL Hitz Pro before development of Strikers, which served as an influence for the fast-paced and physical nature of the game. This was also the last Mario game to be released on the GameCube in Japan and North America.

Strikers is a sports game incorporating characters and themes from the Mario franchise. The game features the basic aspects and objectives of a football game, although no referees are present and characters can legitimately shove others out of possession of the ball. As in other games such as Mario Power Tennis, the player can use Mario-themed items such as bananas and red shells to hinder the opposition and gain the advantage. Each team's captain can use "Super Strikes" that, if timed accurately, will result in two points scored for the striker's team. Each team comprises a goal keeper, a main Mario character (captain), and three of the same secondary Mario characters known as "sidekicks".

The game received "generally favorable reviews" according to video game review aggregator Metacritic. In general, reviewers lauded Strikers' accessibility and multiplayer gameplay, but criticised the lack of gameplay modes and single-player offerings. A sequel, Mario Strikers Charged, was released for the Wii in 2007 and a third game, Mario Strikers: Battle League, for the Nintendo Switch in 2022. The original game received its first official re-release on the Nintendo Switch 2 via the Nintendo Classics service on July 3, 2025.

== Gameplay ==
Opponents can be frozen by blue shells with the score tied between Waluigi and Peach.

Super Mario Strikers is a five-a-side football console video game comprising characters and themes from the Mario series. Each team consists of a captain character from the Mario series and three secondary Mario characters known as "sidekicks". Kritter is the goalkeeper for all sides except the "Super Team", which consists of four captain robots and a Robo-Kritter. Both sidekicks and captains have varying gameplay attributes with "balanced" and "defensive" play types available. Strikers follows the basic gameplay featured in most football video games, including the ability to dash, tackle players, and lob the ball. Despite this, characters not in possession can legitimately hit opponents with or without the ball ("Big Hit"), resulting in a more arcade-like style of gameplay. The game also features "Perfect" passes and shots, which trigger in sequence if both a pass and shot are applied close to the opponent's goal. The most powerful shot possible is the "Super Strike", which only the captain can make and will account for two points if successful. Once charged, the player must time button presses accurately on a visible gauge to trigger a successful shot at a goal, resulting in a character-specific animation.

As in other Mario sports titles such as Mario Power Tennis, the player can use items—bananas, red shells, etc.—to impede the opponent. Some "power ups" can aid the user by granting temporary invincibility while others immobilize or hinder the opponent. The player can also push opponents into electric barriers, which can electrocute them. The central antagonist of the Mario universe, Bowser, will also appear occasionally as a non-player character to obstruct the players from each side. Strikers includes six stadia, each having barriers to prevent the ball from going out of play. These stadia only vary aesthetically and do not affect gameplay, featuring different surfaces such as grass and wood. The player can adjust the match settings to limit or expand the match time and select whether features such as the Super Strike will be included. As the player advances through the game, further adjustments can be made called "cheats", that can render goalkeepers weaker and grant an infinite number of items.

Strikers includes multiple gameplay modes such as the "Grudge Match", which is the standard single and multiplayer match mode of the game. Training sessions come in the form of "Strikers 101", where the player can practice individual aspects such as shooting and dashing. "Cup Battles" allows up to four players to compete in tournaments against artificial intelligence opponents to advance through more difficult cups for rewards, with "Super" denoting the higher-ranked tournaments.

== Development ==
Strikers was developed by Next Level Games, who revealed the game at the E3 conference of 2005 in the form of a playable demonstration. In an interview, game director Mike Inglehart and marketing director Grace Kim revealed that Strikers was originally intended to be a more realistic Mario sports game, but the development team opted for an "over-the-top" style after numerous consultations with Nintendo. Next Level Games cited a connection between Strikers and NHL Hitz Pro in terms of gameplay mechanics, claiming that the latter influenced the "responsive gameplay" in Strikers, as well as the use of goalkeepers and on-field collisions. The developers revealed that the character system would be "balanced and fun", although Nintendo had "the ultimate say" in regards to character design, wanting strong and aggressive styles that did not deviate from past characterisations too much. For this reason, voice recording for Strikers required more lines and sounds than in other Mario sports titles. The game was developed in 13 months.

Assisted by producer Ken Yeeloy, Inglehart stated in an interview a willingness to link any new feature of Strikers with the sport of football. With this, they decided to accentuate "the exciting parts" of the game, with Inglehart using the electric fences in the stadia as an example in reference to the physicality of the sport. They also explained reasons for not using a penalty or card system, rating the power-up system as compensation for this considering power-ups are awarded to the team of a player that has been pushed or shoved.

== Reception ==
Reception

Aggregate scores
Aggregator	Score
GameRankings	76.26%
Metacritic	76/100

Review scores
Publication	Score
1Up.com	B−
Electronic Gaming Monthly	7/10
Eurogamer	8/10
Famitsu	(C+A) 32/40; 27/40
Game Informer	6.75/10
GamePro	5/5
GameRevolution	C+
GameSpot	7.2/10
GameSpy	4.5/5
GameTrailers	8.7/10
GameZone	8.2/10
IGN	7.6/10
Nintendo Life	7/10
Nintendo Power	7.5/10
Common Sense Media	5/5
Maxim	7/10

Super Mario Strikers received generally positive reviews from critics, with reviewers lauding the game's characterisation and visual style, being reminiscent to that of Kazuto Nakazawa. GameSpot's Brian Ekberg praised the game's accessibility, stating that "Strikers' pick-up-and-play design will have you playing like a cartoon Pele in no time". Similarly, critics welcomed the developers' choice to forgo traditional football rules in the favour of a more arcade-like style of gameplay. Despite this, IGN complained of a "disappointingly slim" variety of modes, as well as the perceived small roster of characters and inflexibility when choosing teams. On a similar note, Eurogamer criticised the vague presentation of characters attributes, making it difficult to determine what their respective strengths and weaknesses are. Despite enjoying the variety and appearance of Strikers' stadia, GameSpot noted only cosmetic differences among them, and criticised a lack of physical features to make them more interesting.

Strikers' multiplayer gameplay in particular was welcomed by reviewers, who praised the developers for providing aggressive and fast-paced action. Conversely, the game's single player offerings gained a less enthusiastic response, with critics noting "boring" and repetitive gameplay. 1Up.com thought that once players figured out the AI's intricacies, there was little reason to replay the game. GameSpot thought some features were "overpowered" in parts, including the big-hit tackles and the ability to dash constantly given the absence of a stamina meter. Despite this, Eurogamer remarked that it was deeper than first anticipated, while IGN lauded the game's "tight controls" and use of Super Strikes. The ability to push enemies into the electric barrier and the use of items was also welcomed as a means to make the game entertaining while playing defensively.

The game's visuals received a mixed response, with critics reporting occasional problems with Striker's framerate. While praising the character models and goal animations, GameSpot bemoaned the absence of a "Mario feel" when appraising the menu and settings. IGN noted "blurry textures, uninspired stadium designs, and almost incomprehensibly a sometimes sluggish framerate", despite enjoying the characters art style. The audio received a mediocre response, with critics praising the use of character and audience chants while criticising a lack of variety and repetitiveness. GameSpot thought the menu music had "some nice flair to it", despite noting sounds such as Luigi's goal celebration that, while charming when first heard, became tedious. In Japan, Famitsu gave the game a score of three sevens and one six for a total of 27 out of 40; Famitsu Cube + Advance, on the other hand, gave it a score of one nine, two eights, and one seven, for a total of 32 out of 40.

Not all non-video game publications gave the same praise for the game. Common Sense Media gave it all five stars and called it "a perfect game for a bunch of teenagers to play because it's wacky, fast-paced, and just plain fun." However, Maxim gave it a score of seven out of ten and stated that "With matches of five-on-five taking place on small fields with really basic controls, Strikers is classic arcade-style soccer, but the game gets an extra kick from power-ups, random Bowser attacks, and a Telemundo-style announcer." The Sydney Morning Herald gave it a similar score of three-and-a-half stars out of five and called it "immediately likable".

=== Awards and sales ===
In GameSpot's E3 2005 coverage, this game was given the award "Best Sports Game," and was nominated a finalist for "Best Game of Show." It received GameSpy's "Game of the Year 2005" awards for "Best GameCube Sports", "Best GameCube Multiplayer", and was ranked second for all the GameCube games in 2005. It was a finalist for "Sports Game of the Year" by the Academy of Interactive Arts & Sciences during the 9th Annual Interactive Achievement Awards. Super Mario Strikers sold 950,000 copies in North America as of December 27, 2007. It sold 1.20 million copies overall.
