= Mario Strikers Charged =

2007 video game

- Packaging artwork used in America and Korea
- Developer: Next Level Games
- Publisher: Nintendo
- Director: Mike Inglehart
- Producers: Justin Dowdeswell; Ken Yeeloy; Kensuke Tanabe
- Designer: Matt McTavish
- Programmer: David Catlin
- Artists: Kalvin Lyle; Dave Chambers
- Composers: Mike Peacock; Darren Radtke; Chad York; Scott McFadyen; Davor Vulama
- Series: Mario Strikers
- Platform: Wii
- Release: EU: May 25, 2007; AU: June 7, 2007; NA: July 30, 2007; JP: September 20, 2007; KR: March 18, 2010
- Genre: Sports
- Modes: Single player, multiplayer

Mario Strikers Charged (Note: Japanese: マリオストライカーズ チャージド, Hepburn: Mario Sutoraikāzu Chājido) (released as Mario Strikers Charged Football in PAL regions) (Note: known in Europe and Australia as Mario Strikers Charged Football and in Korea as Mario Power Soccer) as is a 2007 sports video game developed by Next Level Games and published by Nintendo for the Wii. It is the sequel to Super Mario Strikers for the GameCube.

Mario Strikers Charged supported the Nintendo Wi-Fi Connection, which permitted players to participate in online matches and tournaments. The game, like its predecessor, received generally positive reviews from critics who praised the visual style, multiplayer, and addition of online play, though the game's single player offerings were criticized.

A sequel, Mario Strikers: Battle League, was announced in a Nintendo Direct in February 2022, and was released on June 10, 2022 for the Nintendo Switch.

== Gameplay ==
A match between Mario and Wario with the score tied

The gameplay of Mario Strikers Charged is similar to that of the Super Mario Strikers with the player playing an exaggerated and arcade-like version of the game of football. A new element for the game is the powerful shot possible is the "Mega Strike", which only the captain can perform and accounts for a varying number of points ranging from three to six. In addition, sidekicks are able to perform a special shot—known as a "Skillshot"—that occurs if sufficiently charged and results in the character releasing a shot that is either able to paralyze or bypass the goalkeeper. Defensively, characters not in possession can hit others with or without the ball, although doing so to others without it will give the opposing team an item.

The power-up system returns from other Mario sports titles. The player can use these items—red shells, bananas, etc.—to impede the opponent and gain an advantage. Some power-ups aid the player by immobilising and hindering the opponent, while others grant temporary invulnerability and allow the user to score a goal more easily. A "Super Ability" item has been implemented into the game, which only the captain can use and grants unique abilities; notably, some like Mario and Luigi will grow to immense size, while others such as Donkey Kong will impede other characters in a large radius.

Strikers features multiple gameplay modes, such as the "Domination Mode," in which the player faces an opponent of the player's choosing. They can also adjust match settings to limit or expand the match time or number of goals which are necessary for victory. The player can also play through "Striker Challenges", where they select a session with certain obstructions, such as missing characters or a susceptible goalkeeper. If they are successful in passing, they are given further adjustments called "cheats", that can render shooting easier and turn off physical elements of the fields in the game. Training sessions appear in the form of "Strikers 101," where the player can practice individual aspects such as shooting and tackling. "Road to the Striker Cup" allows the player to compete in matches against the computer to gain rewards. The player can also partake in online matches with others around the world.

=== Characters ===
There are a total of twelve captains and eight sidekicks to choose from to form a five-player team, which consists of a captain, three sidekicks, and a goalie. All characters, except for the goalies, are separated into five categories: Balanced (balanced in all areas), Playmaker (speedy with good passing ability), Power (good shooting and defensive ability), Offensive (good shooting and passing ability), and Defensive (speedy with good defensive ability). A team may consist of any combination of different sidekicks (e.g. two Koopa Troopas and a Shy Guy). Kritters appear as goalies and can be controlled to stop the opponent's Mega Strike.

Captains:

- Mario (balanced)
- Peach (playmaker)
- Donkey Kong (power)
- Waluigi (defensive)
- Luigi (balanced)
- Wario (offensive)
- Bowser (power)
- Yoshi (balanced)
- Daisy (defensive)
- Bowser Jr. (offensive, unlockable)
- Diddy Kong (playmaker, unlockable)
- Petey Piranha (power, unlockable)

Sidekicks:

- Koopa Troopa (balanced)
- Toad (playmaker)
- Dry Bones (defensive)
- Boo (playmaker)
- Birdo (power)
- Hammer Bro. (offensive)
- Monty Mole (power)
- Shy Guy (balanced)

Goalies:

- Kritter

Crowd:

- Toads, Birdos, Penguins, Ukikis, Piantas, Nokis, Paragoombas, Shy Guys...

=== Game modes ===
==== Road to the Strikers Cup ====
Road to the Strikers Cup is a standard-set tournament mode for up to 1-4 players. The players are challenged by CPU teams along the three cups: The Fire Cup, the Crystal Cup, and the Striker Cup. The gameplay gets difficult as the players progress through the cups. Extreme Mode is added in this game, and makes the game very difficult from the start. Unlike other Mario sports games, players must restart the cup from the beginning when they lose in the elimination round, rather than being given the option to replay the match that they lost in.

==== Domination Mode ====
This mode allows players to split into two teams. Up to four players can play, and the players can play 1 vs. 1, 2 vs. 2, 1 vs. 2, and 1 vs. 3 matches. The players can also cooperate up to four players against a CPU player.

==== Striker Challenges ====
Like the rest of the game modes, this mode is playable for up to 1-4 players. Every character has one challenge, amounting to 12 challenges in total. A lot of challenges require the player(s) to win such as the goalie not being able to catch the ball because of being weak to charged shots, or the opposing team leading by 5 points by the start of the match. The challenges are separated by difficulty and get more difficult as the player(s) progresses.

==== Nintendo WFC Mode ====
Players can access the Internet to play with friends online in their region. Matches are available for any combination of four players on two teams as long as at least one player controls each team with a maximum of two players per a Wii Console. Points earned in ranked matches are determined on their position for "Striker of the Day". Players earn 10 points for winning a match, plus one point for each goal they score, up to a maximum of 10. Players who lose a match are awarded one point for finishing the game, but will lose ten points if they do not by rage quitting.

In this mode, any captain is selectable, no matter if they are unlocked or not.

== Development ==
Despite the potential for motion controls on the Wii, Next Level Games limited Charged's use of motion controls to a few actions after determining that many others could be more conveniently implemented with button presses.

== Reception ==
Reception

Aggregate scores
Aggregator	Score
GameRankings	79.43%
Metacritic	79/100

Review scores
Publication	Score
Edge	6/10
Electronic Gaming Monthly	7.5/10
Eurogamer	8/10
Game Informer	7.25/10
GamePro	5/5
GameRevolution	C+
GameSpot	7.5/10
GameSpy	4/5
GameTrailers	7.4/10
IGN	(UK) 8.7/10 (US) 8.3/10
Nintendo Life	8/10
Nintendo Power	8.5/10
Nintendo World Report	8.5/10

Like its predecessor, the game received generally positive reviews from critics ("generally favorable reviews" according to video game review aggregator website Metacritic). Still, the visual style, reminiscent of Kazuto Nakazawa was praised, as well as the multiplayer and improvements. However, some had little praise for its single-player offerings and noted shallow gameplay. Official Nintendo Magazine praised the pick-up and play feel of the game, giving the game a 91%. Hyper's Rico Shavez commended the game for its "great net code" and being "immediately fun". However, he criticised it for its "lack of options, being shallow and its lightweight single player".

As of March 31, 2008, 1.77 million copies of the game have been sold worldwide, with 240,000 being sold in Japan. It received a "Gold" sales award from the ELSPA, indicating sales of at least 200,000 copies in the United Kingdom. By the end of 2019, the game sold 2.6 million units worldwide by CESA

=== Legacy ===
In 2026, Mario Strikers Charged was ranked at the top of IGN's "10 Best Mario Sports Games" list.

== See also ==
- List of Wii Wi-Fi Connection games
