= Next Level Games =

Canadian video game developer

Next Level Games, Inc.
- Type: Subsidiary
- Industry: Video games
- Founded: August 22, 2002; 24 years ago
- Founders: Eric Randall; Douglas Tronsgard; Jason Carr; David Catlin
- Headquarters: Vancouver, British Columbia, Canada
- Key people: Alex MacFarlane (president and managing director)
- Number of employees: 154 (2026)
- Parent: Nintendo (2021–present)
- Website: nextlevelgames.com

Next Level Games, Inc. is a Canadian video game developer owned by Nintendo since 2021 and based in Vancouver. Founded in August 2002 by former members of EA Black Box who worked on games such as Sega Soccer Slam and NHL Hitz titles, Next Level Games specializes in creating console video games. The company's first project was NHL Hitz Pro, which was published by Midway Games in 2003 and followed up from EA Black Box's prior entries in the NHL Hitz series. The company is best known for its work with Nintendo, developing titles including the Mario Strikers games and Punch-Out!! for the Wii, Luigi's Mansion: Dark Moon and Metroid Prime: Federation Force for the Nintendo 3DS, and Luigi's Mansion 3 for the Nintendo Switch.

Among other awards, Next Level Games has been named one of "Canada's Top 100 Employers" and one of BC's Top Employers in 2008, 2009 and 2012. The company has been featured in Maclean's magazine and BC Business magazine.

== History ==
In January 2014, the studio announced that it would work exclusively with Nintendo from then on. In that same interview, co-founder Jason Carr and producer Ken Yeeloy revealed that it was Nintendo who approached Next Level Games in the first place to develop Super Mario Strikers for the GameCube due to much of the team's prior work on Sega Soccer Slam at EA Black Box.

In January 2021, Nintendo announced that it had purchased Next Level Games after "A number of owner-directors recently determined that the time is right for them to sell their shares, and NLG therefore began exploring potential sale transactions". According to Nintendo's 2021 annual report, this acquisition took place on March 31, 2021. Co-founder Tronsgard would later retire from the studio by March 2022.

== List of games developed ==
List of games developed by Next Level Games
Year	Title	Platform(s)	Publisher(s)
2003	NHL Hitz Pro	GameCube; Xbox; PlayStation 2	Midway Games
2005	Super Mario Strikers	GameCube	Nintendo
2007	Mario Strikers Charged	Wii	Nintendo
2007	Spider-Man: Friend or Foe	PlayStation 2 Xbox 360; Wii	Activision
2008	Ticket to Ride	Xbox 360	Playful Entertainment
2009	Jungle Speed	Wii	Playful Entertainment
2009	Punch-Out!!	Wii	Nintendo
2009	Doc Louis's Punch-Out!!	Wii	Nintendo
2010	Transformers: Cybertron Adventures	Wii	Activision
2010	Tom Clancy's Ghost Recon	Wii	Ubisoft
2011	Captain America: Super Soldier	Xbox 360; PlayStation 3	Sega
2012	Microsoft Solitaire Collection (Note: Co-developed with Arkadium and Smoking Gun Interactive)	Microsoft Windows iOS; Android	Xbox Game Studios
2013	Luigi's Mansion: Dark Moon	Nintendo 3DS	Nintendo
2016	Metroid Prime: Federation Force	Nintendo 3DS	Nintendo
2016	Metroid Prime: Blast Ball	Nintendo 3DS	Nintendo
2019	Luigi's Mansion 3	Nintendo Switch	Nintendo
2022	Mario Strikers: Battle League	Nintendo Switch	Nintendo
2025	Metroid Prime 4: Beyond (Note: Design support for Retro Studios)	Nintendo Switch; Nintendo Switch 2	Nintendo

=== Cancelled ===
- WWE Titans: Parts Unknown - PS2, Xbox
- Super Mario Spikers – Wii
- Catalyst - PS3, Xbox 360
- Clockwerk – Wii, X360, PS3
