= Gen Atlas =

Upcoming video game

- Developer: genDESIGN
- Publisher: Epic Games Publishing
- Director: Fumito Ueda
- Platforms: PlayStation 5; Windows; Xbox Series X/S
- Genre: Action-adventure
- Mode: Single-player

Gen Atlas (stylized as genATLAS) is an upcoming action-adventure video game developed by genDESIGN and published by Epic Games Publishing. The game is directed by Fumito Ueda, known for his work on Ico, Shadow of the Colossus and The Last Guardian. It is planned for release on PlayStation 5, Xbox Series X/S, and PC via the Epic Games Store.

== Setting ==
Gen Atlas is a single-player open-world action-adventure video game played from a third-person perspective. In the game, players explore a desolate wasteland filled with the remains of colossal robots. The game has a larger emphasis on combat than Ueda's past works, and players can use a variety of firearms to defeat enemies. The protagonist is accompanied by a giant robot head that serves various functions, from navigation to puzzle-solving. As players locate additional robot parts and reattach them to the head, new gameplay mechanics will unlock.

== Development ==
The game is being directed by Fumito Ueda, and was the debut project of his independent studio, genDesign, which was founded in 2014. He departed from Sony in 2011 during the development of The Last Guardian, and continued to work on the title as an outside contractor. Following its release, Ueda focused on recruiting for the studio, and development of the game started in 2020.

The core concept of giant robots was created first, and the sci-fi setting and narrative around it were built later. According to Ueda, Gen Atlas was designed to be a "fresh" experience while maintaining motifs and themes similar to his previous works. He further added that while Japanese robots often have a "fun, toy-ish" look, the robots in the game were designed to feel grounded and believable, and he cited Giant Robo and WALL-E as his sources of inspiration. While Ueda's previous games featured minimal dialogue, communication between the protagonist and his robot companion plays a more significant role in Gen Atlas, with a log tracking their conversations. Ueda compared his scriptwriting process to composing a haiku, leaving certain story elements ambiguous for players to interpret, and relying on environmental details for story-telling.

Exploration is emphasized, with the team hoping that navigating the environment will spark players' curiosity. Ueda compared Gen Atlas to Shadow of the Colossus, adding that the two games share a similar scale and balance between exploration and action. While Gen Atlas was not designed as a shooter game, the team viewed gunplay as a natural gameplay inclusion given its sci-fi setting. Ueda described gunplay as a way for the player to solve obstacles and challenges, and that it was only one of several mechanics for players to progress in the game. The increased emphasis on combat stemmed from Ueda’s response to feedback on The Last Guardian, where players often felt frustrated by having no direct way to fight back against enemies. The game's traversal mechanics were inspired by Air Ranger: Rescue Helicopter.

In March 2020, Epic Games announced that it had founded a publishing arm, with genDesign being listed as one of its partners. Under this initiative, Epic Games fully subsidized the game's development while allowing genDesign to retain full creative freedom and rights to the intellectual property. The project was revealed at The Game Awards 2024 under the working title Project Robot. In June 2026, during Summer Game Fest 2026, the game was unveiled alongside its first gameplay trailer.
