= Golden Sun: The Lost Age =

2002 video game

- North American box art showcasing the game's main characters. Clockwise from top: Piers, Jenna, Felix, and Sheba.
- Developer: Camelot Software Planning
- Publisher: Nintendo
- Director: Shugo Takahashi
- Producers: Shinji Hatano; Hiroyuki Takahashi; Shugo Takahashi
- Artist: Fumihide Aoki
- Writer: Hiroyuki Takahashi
- Composer: Motoi Sakuraba
- Series: Golden Sun
- Platform: Game Boy Advance
- Release: JP: June 28, 2002; NA: April 14, 2003; AU: April 17, 2003; EU: September 19, 2003
- Genre: Role-playing
- Modes: Single-player, multiplayer

Golden Sun: The Lost Age (Note: Japanese: 黄金の太陽 失われし時代, Hepburn: Ōgon no Taiyō: Ushinawareshi Toki) is a 2002 role-playing video game for the Game Boy Advance, developed by Camelot Software Planning and published by Nintendo. It is the second installment in the Golden Sun series and was released on June 28, 2002, in Japan, and in 2003 in North America and Europe.

Taking place after the events of the previous game, The Lost Age puts the player into the roles of the previous games' antagonists, primarily from the perspective of magic-attuned "adepts" Felix and his allies as they seek to restore the power of alchemy to the world of Weyard. Along the way, the player uses Psynergy to defeat enemies and discover new locations, help out local populations, and find elemental djinn which augment the characters' powers. Players can transfer their characters and items from Golden Sun to The Lost Age through a password system or Game Link Cable, and are rewarded for fully completing both games.

Upon release, The Lost Age was positively received by critics and audiences. IGN ranked the game as the eighth-best Game Boy Advance title of 2003 and the 22nd-best GBA game of all time. It has sold over 680,000 units. It was eventually followed by a third installment, titled Dark Dawn, released in 2010 and set thirty years after the two original games.

Like its predecessor, The Lost Age was re-released for the Wii U's Virtual Console service via the Nintendo eShop. It became available first in Japan on July 23, 2014, and later in North America and PAL regions. Along with Golden Sun, it was released on the Nintendo Classics service on January 17, 2024.

== Gameplay ==
The Lost Age follows the same traditional role-playing video game formula as Golden Sun. Players control a cast of characters as they journey through a fantasy-themed world, interact with other characters, battle monsters, acquire magic spells and equipment, and take part in a building, predefined narrative. While many actions the player takes are compulsory and central to the story, The Lost Age allows them to complete many objectives in the order they choose. As well, visiting previous locations to advance story elements and complete gameplay objectives are given a stronger emphasis than in the previous game.

Most gameplay outside of battle takes place either in the game's overworld or within dungeons, caves, and other locales with puzzles integrated into their layout. Unlike the original game, in which the overworld was explored on foot except for a brief, non-navigable boat ride, a large portion of The Lost Age's gameplay involves navigating a magical ship across a large sea and visiting continents and islands. To complete puzzles, players must either push pillars to construct negotiable paths between elevated areas, climb up or descend cliffs, or obtain a special item to progress through the story and game world. Many of these puzzles revolve heavily around the usage of Psynergy, requiring the player to find items that grant the bearer new forms of Psynergy to accomplish tasks. Acquiring new Psynergy spells gives players access to new locations and secrets hidden within the game world.

Besides combat, Psynergy spells are also heavily used in puzzles and exploration. Some types of Psynergy can only be used in either combat or in the overworld and non-battle scenarios. Other types of Psynergy can be used in both situations; for example, the “Frost” spell can be used to damage enemies in battle or to transform puddles of water into elongated pillars of ice as part of puzzles. The player gains more Psynergy spells as the game progresses, either through levelling up or acquiring and equipping, or using, special items. With each "utility" Psynergy spell, the party gains access to more locations and secrets hidden within the game world. Players are required to return to previous locations in the game to finish puzzles which they were previously unable to solve due to lacking specific Psynergy spells.

=== Battle ===
A battle at sea showcases four of the main characters. Characters' vital statistics are listed along the top of the screen.

The Lost Age contains both random monster encounters and compulsory battles that advance the story. When a battle begins, a separate screen is brought up where the enemy party is on the opposing side and the player's party is on the battling side. While a battle being is conducted, the characters and background swirl around and change positions in a pseudo-3D effect.

In battle, the player must defeat all enemies using direct attacks with weapons, offensive Psynergy spells, and other means of causing damage while keeping the party alive through items and supportive Psynergy that restore life and supplement defense. If all the player's characters are downed by reducing their hit points to zero, the party is returned to the last village that the player visited and loses money. Successfully completing a battle yields experience points, coins, and occasionally rare items. In addition to the main game, there is also a competitive battling mode accessible from the menu screen, where players can enter their teams into an arena to battle CPU-controlled enemies or other players.

=== Djinn system ===
One of the primary gameplay features in the Golden Sun series is elemental creatures called Djinn (singular: Djinni), which can be found throughout the game and which The Lost Age adds new types of. Not counting the ones that can only be found in the original Golden Sun, there are eleven Djinn for each of the four elements that can be allocated to each character. Djinn form the basis of the game's statistics enhancement system, and when allocated, modify a character's classes, increasing maximum hit points, Psynergy points, and other statistics, and altering the available Psynergy they can perform. Djinni may also be used to directly attack an opponent; once used, they no longer contribute to a character's class, but can be used to attack an opponent by summoning a powerful elemental spirit. This is the most powerful method of attack and also the riskiest, as it requires Djinn to be on standby, meaning that they are unable to bolster the statistics of the character they are equipped to. Once a Djinni on Standby is used for a Summon Sequence, it must recover for several turns before it restores itself to Set position on a character. However, a subsequent increase in the affinity of the attack's element is bolstered on the character for the duration of the battle.

== Synopsis ==
=== Characters and setting ===
Like Golden Sun, The Lost Age takes place in the world of Weyard. For most of the game, the player controls four characters. The main protagonist is Felix, an eighteen-year-old Venus Adept from the village of Vale who was an anti-hero in Golden Sun. His younger sister, Jenna, a seventeen-year-old Mars Adept from Vale, and fourteen-year-old Jupiter Adept Sheba, as well as sharp-witted elderly scholar Kraden, are hostages that Felix was forced to take with his now-deceased masters, the Mars Adept warriors Saturos and Menardi, who served as the previous game's antagonists. In the game, the player controls Felix as he strives to complete Saturos and Menardi's original objective to restore Alchemy to the world of Weyard. Early on, they are joined by Mercury Adept Piers, a mysterious young man whose ship Felix's party uses to explore the world throughout their journey.

Several groups of characters serve as antagonists in The Lost Age. Felix is opposed by the heroes of the original Golden Sun, led by Venus Adept warrior Isaac, who pursue him across Weyard believing that Alchemy would potentially destroy Weyard if unleashed. One of Saturos' original companions, the powerful and enigmatic Mercury Adept Alex, allies himself with Karst and Agatio, powerful and imposing Mars Adept warriors, the former of whom is Menardi's younger sister.

=== Plot ===
Plot progression in Golden Sun games occur in cutscenes featuring character facial portraits next to text boxes.

Isaac's party has killed Saturos and Menardi, but they succeeded in activating two of the four Elemental Lighthouses situated across Weyard. Saturos' companion Felix takes the rest of his group and sets out on his own journey to complete Saturos' original objective and activate the remaining two Lighthouses, as lighting all four will restore Alchemy to Weyard. He is joined by his sister Jenna, Jupiter Adept Sheba, who was previously kidnapped by Saturos, and scholar Kraden. The group searches for a ship to cross to the western half of Weyard, and learns of a man named Piers who has been falsely accused of piracy and owns a ship they can use. After Felix and his group clear his name, Piers agrees to join them. During this, Isaac's party continues to pursue them. The group also discovers that their former companion Alex has allied himself with Menardi's younger sister Karst and her partner Agatio to keep Felix on track.

Felix's party is able to access Piers' home, the legendary, secluded Atlantis-like society of Lemuria, which is located far out in the ocean. After convening with Lemuria's ancient king, Hydros, they learn of Alchemy's true nature; it is the sustenance of Weyard's life force, and its absence has caused the world's continents to decrease in size and parts of the world to collapse into the abyss. Knowing that restoring Alchemy will save the world, Felix crosses the sea to activate the Jupiter Lighthouse. However, when Isaac's party enters the lighthouse, Karst and Agatio ambush and trap them. Felix rescues Isaac, but Karst and Agatio escape with the Mars Star, which was formerly in Isaac's possession.

Felix is able to explain to Isaac why Alchemy's release is necessary for everyone, and that Saturos and Menardi aimed to do so for the sake of the survival of their home colony of Prox, which is located to the far north near the Mars Lighthouse. He also reveals that his parents and Isaac's father are alive and being held hostage in Prox to coerce Felix's initial cooperation. Isaac and his company agree to aid Felix, and the group sets out north to activate the Mars Lighthouse.

The group discovers that Karst and Agatio have been transformed into mindless dragons and are forced to defeat them, with them returning the Mars Star before succumbing to their wounds. When they reach the tower's top, the Wise One, the entity responsible for originally tasking Isaac with preventing the breaking of Alchemy's seal, confronts them. He warns them that mankind could destroy Weyard if they possessed such a power; when Isaac insists on breaking the seal despite this, the Wise One summons a giant, three-headed dragon for the party to battle, only for it to be revealed to be Isaac's father and Felix and Jenna's parents fused by the Wise One to test the party's resolve. After slaying the dragon, the party of Adepts finish their objective and activate Mars Lighthouse.

With all four towers across Weyard lit, the process that heralds the return of Alchemy to Weyard ensues at the mountain sanctum Mt. Aleph. Alex appears, revealing that he took advantage of everyone else's quests to gain immense power from the light of the Golden Sun, a manifestation of Alchemy itself. However, he discovers that the Wise One had taken steps to prevent this, and is left to die as the mountain sinks into the earth. Meanwhile, Isaac, Felix and Jenna's parents are revealed to have been resurrected by the light from Mars Lighthouse, and they join the group of Adepts on their homebound voyage to the village of Vale. Upon reaching, they find that Vale and most of Mt. Aleph has sunk into the ground, but also discover that the Wise One telepathically ordered all the villagers to evacuate, including Isaac's mother. The group has a joyful reunion with their loved ones, concluding the game.

== Development and release ==
The Lost Age was first revealed to Japan in early 2002, with the magazine Famitsu being the first publication to review the game. The Lost Age was highly anticipated; it topped IGN's list of Game Boy Advance "Most Wanted" games for 2003. The North American version of the game was playable at Electronic Entertainment Expo 2002. GameSpot previewed a localized copy of The Lost Age in February 2003, and noted that the game built on its predecessor's graphics engine, with "the environments in the game featuring rich detail with little touches—such as birds that fly off as you approach." The game was released in Japan on June 28, 2002, and the following year in North America on April 14, in Australia on April 17, and in Europe on September 19.

== Reception ==
Reception

Aggregate scores
Aggregator	Score
GameRankings	87% (51 Reviews)
Metacritic	86% (29 Reviews)

Review scores
Publication	Score
Electronic Gaming Monthly	8.2/10
Famitsu	9/10, 8/10, 9/10, 7/10
GameSpot	8.6/10
GameSpy	86/100
IGN	9/10

The Lost Age generally received positive reviews, but critics were divided on whether or not the game was better than the original Golden Sun. On Metacritic, The Lost Age has an 86% aggregate rating, compared to Golden Sun's 91%. Likewise, GameRankings gives The Lost Age an 87% overall rating, slightly lower than Golden Sun's 90%. Conversely, The Lost Age was ranked 78 on IGN's Readers Choice Top 100 games ever, higher than its predecessor. It was also rated the 69th best game made on a Nintendo System in Nintendo Power's "Top 200 Games" list.

IGN gave the sequel high praise; while most of the game mechanics remained unchanged, the addition of more complicated puzzles was welcomed. The Lost Age subsequently became IGN's "Game of the Month" in April 2003. Shane Bettenhausen of Electronic Gaming Monthly argued that though The Lost Age is "not going to win any originality contests (this looks, sounds, and feels nearly identical to its predecessor), but when more of the same means more top-notch roleplaying, I can't complain". Other publications singled out the graphics and audio as particularly strong features. The publication later named The Lost Age the best Game Boy Advance game of April 2003.

Some publications found fault with complaints which remained from the original, including the combat system. IGN and GamePro took issue with the lack of "smart" combat; if an enemy is killed before other party members attack it, those members switch to defense instead of intelligently attacking the remaining enemies. Ethan Einhorn of GameNOW felt that the only elements that set the fighting system above "typical RPG fare" were the graphics. GameSpy felt that Camelot could have added more features.

The Lost Age sold 96,000 units in its first week in Japan, being the best-selling game of the period. The game sold a total of 249,000 copies in Japan and 437,000 in North America by November 21, 2004.
