= Golden Sun (video game) =

2001 video game

- North American box art showcasing the game's main characters. Clockwise from top: Mia, Ivan, Isaac, and Garet.
- Developer: Camelot Software Planning
- Publisher: Nintendo
- Director: Shugo Takahashi
- Producers: Shinji Hatano; Hiroyuki Takahashi; Shugo Takahashi
- Artist: Fumihide Aoki
- Writer: Hiroyuki Takahashi
- Composer: Motoi Sakuraba
- Series: Golden Sun
- Platform: Game Boy Advance
- Release: JP: August 1, 2001; NA: November 12, 2001; EU: February 22, 2002
- Genre: Role-playing
- Modes: Single player, multiplayer

Golden Sun (Note: Known in Japan as Ōgon no Taiyō: Hirakareshi Fūin (Japanese: 黄金の太陽 開かれし封印; lit. Golden Sun: The Opened Seal)) is a 2001 role-playing video game developed by Camelot Software Planning and published by Nintendo for the Game Boy Advance. The game follows a band of magic-attuned teenagers called Adepts on a mission to protect the world of Weyard from alchemy, a potentially destructive power that was sealed away long ago. During their quest, the Adepts develop new magic abilities called Psynergy, assist others, and learn more about why alchemy was sealed away. Golden Sun is followed by a sequel, The Lost Age, which together form a complete story.

Golden Sun was released in August 2001 in Japan, November 2001 in North America, and February 2002 in Europe. It began as a single planned game for the Nintendo 64, but production shifted to the Game Boy Advance over the course of development. After facing hardware constraints, the developers decided to split the game into two.

Golden Sun was critically and commercially successful, being the top-selling game for four months in Japan and selling more than one million units worldwide. Critics praised its narrative, visuals, gameplay, and innovative mechanics, and celebrated its ability to rival console RPGs, with minor criticisms directed toward its slow start and occasional mechanical quirks. The game spawned a series that includes three games and appearances in other media.

== Gameplay ==
Golden Sun's form of magic, Psynergy, can be used in and out of combat. Here, an ice spell is used to create a navigable path of frozen ice pillars from puddles of water.

Golden Sun is a role-playing video game. The primary game mode is single-player and story-based, in which the player controls a cast of four characters as they embark on a quest, interact with other characters, battle monsters, and acquire new abilities and equipment. Golden Sun features an optional battling mode accessible from the menu screen, in which players can enter a team from their saved game files into an arena environment to battle CPU-controlled enemies. There is also a two-person player versus player battle mode, which requires each player to have a copy of the game and a Game Link Cable.

The overworld of Golden Sun, which players explore from a top-down perspective, contains towns, caves, and dungeons. Environments often contain puzzles, which require the player to perform actions such as creating makeshift bridges by pushing logs into rivers or shifting the track of a mine cart to gain access to new areas. Many puzzles require use of the game's magic spells, called "Psynergy". Psynergy is used in both combat and the environment; for example, the "Whirlwind" spell, which damages enemies in battle, is also used out of battle to remove overgrown foliage blocking the player's path. Psynergy comes in four elements: Venus (rocks and plants), Mars (fire and heat), Jupiter (wind and electricity), and Mercury (water and ice). Players can return to previous locations in the game to finish puzzles which they previously could not solve due to lacking a specific Psynergy spell.

Battles in Golden Sun have many special effects. Here, a weapon-specific attack is unleashed by the sword Gaia Blade.

Golden Sun contains both random monster encounters, featuring randomly selected enemies, and boss battles that advance the story. During combat, the camera shifts to a pseudo-3D view, spinning and zooming depending on the attacks and items used. In battle, players must defeat enemies while keeping their own party alive through items and Psynergy that restore life and supplement defense. The player receives a "Game Over" if each character's hit points are reduced to zero; if this happens, the player loses money and the party is returned to the sanctum in the last visited town. After winning a battle, players receive experience points, coins, and occasionally items.

Players can change their characters' class and powers using collectable creatures called Djinn. There are 28 Djinn in Golden Sun, seven for each of the four elements. They are encountered in the overworld or in dungeons, and either join the player willingly or after being defeated in combat. Assigning Djinn to different characters changes their character class, enabling them to use different psynergy, as well as statistics such as hit points or defense. Djinn can either be "Set" to a player or put on "Standby". Each Set Djinni has a special ability which can be invoked during combat by the character it is attached to, which includes enhanced elemental attacks, buffing/debuffing spells, healing/restoration spells, and other effects. After being used, the Djinni shifts to "Standby" mode until it is "Set" on the character again. In Standby mode, Djinn do not contribute to character statistics, but can be used for powerful elemental summon spells; after being used for summoning, they return to the Set position after a cooldown period.

Upon finishing the game, players can transfer their characters and items from Golden Sun to its sequel, The Lost Age, through a password system or Game Link Cable, and receive additional rewards in The Lost Age for fully completing both games.

== Synopsis ==
=== Setting and characters ===
Golden Sun takes place in the fantasy world of "Weyard"—a massive, earth-like environment with several major continents and oceans. Weyard is governed by the mythological concept of the classical elements. Matter consists of any combination of the four base elements: Venus (earth), Mars (fire), Mercury (water), and Jupiter (wind). These elements can be manipulated by the now lost powers of alchemy. Certain people, called Adepts, can use Psynergy (magic) based on the elements.

The player controls four teenaged Adepts in Golden Sun: Isaac, his close friend Garet, Ivan, and Mia. A fifth character playable in the game's exposition sequence is Jenna, another childhood friend to Isaac. The primary antagonists of the game are Saturos and Menardi, powerful and talented Adepts who seek to restore Alchemy to the world. They are assisted by the powerful and mysterious Alex, who was formerly Mia's apprentice; and Jenna's older brother, Felix, who is indebted to Saturos for saving his life.

=== Plot ===
In Weyard's ancient past, the power of alchemy enabled the development of great civilizations. However, it also caused worldwide conflict that subsided only after it was sealed away. The keys to unlocking alchemy are four elemental stars hidden within the mountain shrine, Mt. Aleph, which is guarded by the town of Vale at the mountain's base. In the game's prologue, Saturos and Menardi lead a raiding party into Mt. Aleph to seize the elemental stars for themselves. They accidentally activate protective traps, causing a thunderstorm and rock slide. In the ensuing chaos, Felix is presumed dead, as are Isaac's father and Jenna's parents.

Three years later, Isaac, Garet, and Jenna join their teacher, Kraden, in his research of Mt. Aleph. They are confronted by Saturos and Menardi, now assisted by Alex and a surviving Felix, who coerce Isaac into giving them three of the four stars. After being forced to flee as the volcano erupts, Saturos and Menardi abduct Jenna and Kraden as bargaining chips. Isaac and Garet are saved by the guardian of Mt. Aleph, the Wise One. He instructs the teens to prevent Saturos' group from casting the stars into their respective elemental lighthouses across Weyard, which will unseal alchemy's power.

Isaac and Garet pursue Saturos' group to the Mercury Lighthouse, meeting Ivan and Mia during their travels. Despite their best efforts, they fail to prevent Saturos from activating Mercury Lighthouse. Saturos' group leaves for the next Lighthouse with Isaac's party in pursuit. In the ensuing chase, Isaac learns that Saturos has taken another Adept hostage: the female Jupiter Adept, Sheba. Saturos and Menardi activate the Venus Lighthouse before Isaac's party confronts them. Saturos and Menardi merge to form a massive two-headed dragon, but are killed by the party. The remnants of Saturos's group continue their quest to light the remaining two lighthouses, with Jenna, Sheba, and Kraden still with them. The game ends as Isaac's party boards a ship to sail Weyard's open seas and continue their mission.

== Development ==
Camelot Software Planning spent between twelve and eighteen months developing Golden Sun, considered a long time for a handheld video game; IGN described the finished product as a testament to the positive results a long development cycle can bring. Camelot was no stranger to role-playing games, having previously developed Shining Force for Sega, and Mario Golf and Mario Tennis for Nintendo—sports games with role-playing elements.

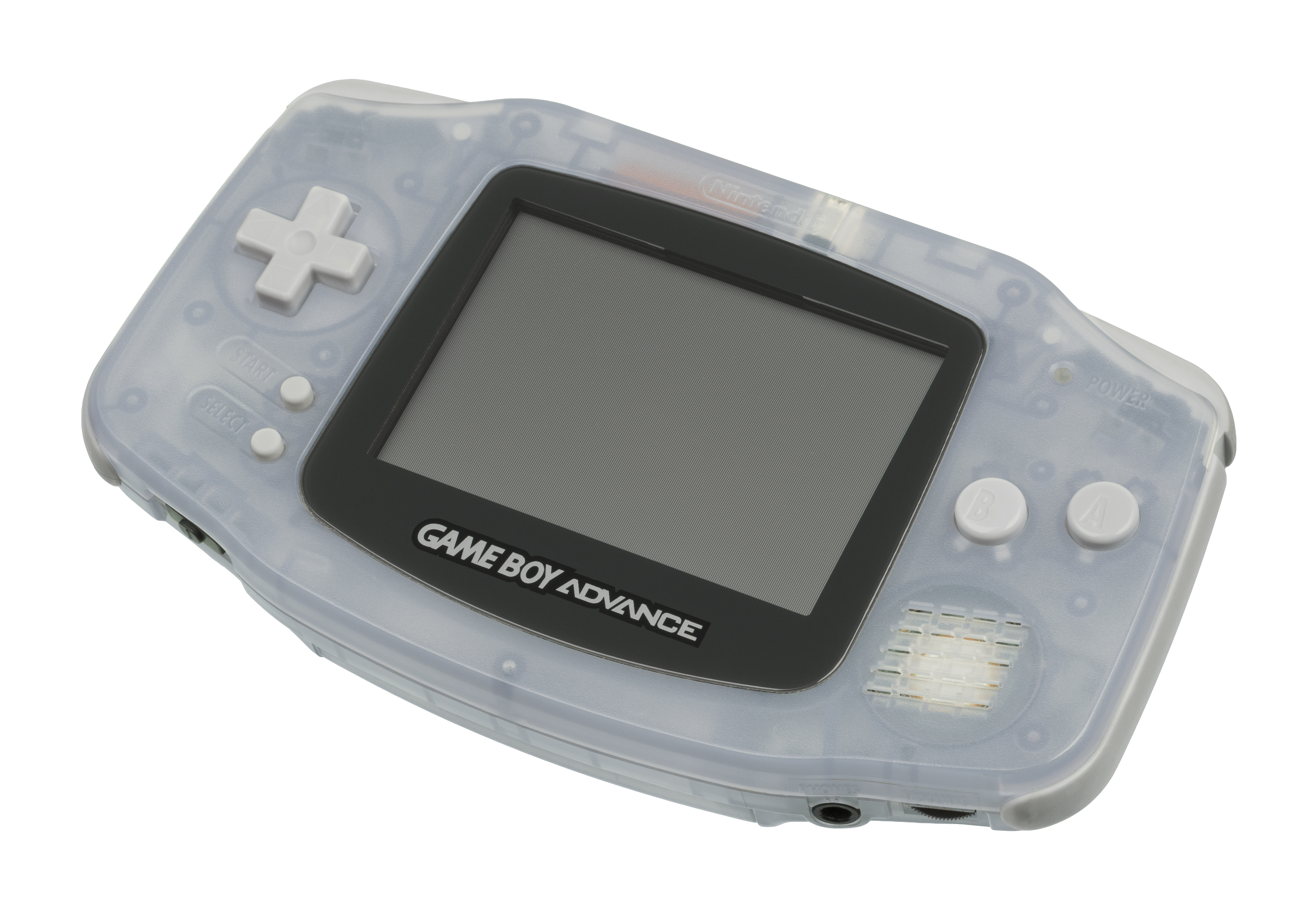
Golden Sun was originally intended as a single game for the Nintendo 64 console, but evolved into a duology for the handheld Game Boy Advance (pictured).

Camelot originally planned to create a single game instead of a series, and in the early stages of the project created a game design document for Golden Sun on the Nintendo 64 console. When it became apparent the Nintendo 64 was being replaced by the GameCube, Camelot shifted their focus to making a game on the handheld Game Boy Advance. Due to the developer's ambitions for the scope of the game and the hardware limitations of a single Game Boy Advance cartridge, the single game was expanded to become two. Scenario writer Hiroyuki Takahashi and director Shugo Takahashi had previously designed Shining Force III, where the story involved playing through the perspectives of both the "good" and "bad" characters. They incorporated elements of this storytelling methodology into the two-game setup of the Golden Sun series, having the player control the protagonists in Golden Sun and the antagonists in the followup.

A major goal with Golden Sun was to make the game's magic usable outside battle for puzzles, and offer players a high level of freedom in how to approach events, rather than a linear story that could only be experienced one way. Camelot's President Hiroyuki Takahashi asserted that players would be unable to experience all story paths in a single playthrough, and that this combined with the game's multiplayer mode would add to Golden Sun's replay value.

In August 2000, Camelot showed an early but playable version at the Nintendo Space World Expo in Japan. The game was intended to launch alongside the Game Boy Advance, but slipped to the summer and released in Japan in August 2001. While it was eagerly anticipated in the west, players had to make do with Japanese-language imports until the game was localized and released in North America in November, and Europe in February 2002.

== Reception ==
Reception

Aggregate score
Aggregator	Score
Metacritic	91/100

Review scores
Publication	Score
Electronic Gaming Monthly	9/10
Famitsu	9/10, 8/10, 9/10, 8/10
Game Informer	8.5/10
GamePro	5/5
GameSpot	8.6/10
GameSpy	94%
GamesRadar+	94%
IGN	9.7/10
Nintendo Life	8/10
Nintendo Power	5/5
X-Play	5/5

Golden Sun received "universal acclaim" from critics, according to review aggregator platform Metacritic. Nintendo Power called it "the richest, most intricate RPG ever to hit a handheld", while Jason D'Aprile of GameSpy and Andy McNamara of Game Informer labeled it one of the best RPGs on any platform. Craig Harris of IGN and Christian Nutt of Electronic Gaming Monthly praised Camelot's expertise, and Rick Moulton of GamesRadar highlighted its addictive quality, making it feel like a console game. Eurogamer's Ronan Jennings wrote that prior to Golden Sun, Nintendo treated the Game Boy Advance as "nothing more than a SNES emulator by its makers [...] [Golden Sun] not only compared favorably to 16-bit classics of its kind, it even surpassed the majority of them."

Golden Sun was regarded as visually spectacular for a GBA title, with D'Aprile claiming it was graphically better than some PlayStation RPGs. The game was lauded for its colorful, detailed environments and dynamic battle sequences with particle effects and a rotating camera. The visuals were described as "elegant", "gorgeous", and "a marvel", with Robert Hughes of Nintendo Life noting their enduring appeal on the Wii U Virtual Console. Ricardo Torres of GameSpot mentioned that the GBA's screen can make the visuals hard to appreciate in poor lighting, but clarified that this is a hardware limitation rather than a game flaw.

The story was praised for its depth and character development, though its slow start and reliance on familiar RPG tropes was noted. Harris emphasized the tightly integrated, intricate plot, warning that distractions can make it hard to follow. Nutt said that although the game's story is "by the book", the characters are elevated by excellent writing and translation. Miguel Concepcion of Extended Play highlighted the cliffhanger ending, which may leave players eager for the sequel. D'Aprile and Hughes appreciated the character-driven storytelling, despite some clichéd elements. Moulton, Harris and Hughes noted the slow-paced opening, with excessive dialogue and unnecessary yes/no prompts that feel contrived, and Hughes mentioned the story can be hard to follow due to verbose chatter.

The gameplay was lauded for its user-friendly menus, engaging puzzles, and fast-paced battles. The Psynergy mechanic was praised for its dual use in combat and environmental puzzle-solving, such as moving objects or reading minds, which Hughes said added a Zelda-like interactivity to exploration. The Djinn were highlighted for their strategic depth and customization, with Hughes noting the risk/reward dynamic of using Djinn in battle. The turn-based combat was described as fast, visually exciting, and accessible, though Torres critiqued the inability to retarget enemies if one dies mid-turn, and McNamara found the battles too easy. The puzzles were regarded as fun and challenging, requiring clever use of Psynergy, though Hughes noted some frustration with precise positioning for Psynergy use. Harris was annoyed by random battles disrupting exploration, and Hughes warned that the Djinn and Psynergy mechanics are initially poorly explained.

The soundtrack was regarded strongly, with Nintendo Power praising the authentic-sounding bass, percussion, and woodwinds, while Harris highlighted the use of sampled pan flutes and strings, recommending headphones. Hughes found the soundtrack competent but lacking memorable tracks, though he deemed the battle theme a stand-out.

Concepcion and Nintendo Power's Christopher Shepperd praised the game's unmatched length for a handheld RPG, with Concepcion estimating over 20 hours of gameplay, though Torres noted it is shorter than some console RPGs. Torres and D'Aprile regarded the Battle Mode as a novel addition, while Moulton and Concepcion cited Djinn collection and side quests as extensions to the game's playtime. Harris found the Battle Mode underwhelming, and Hughes warned that the game's slow start may deter impatient players.

=== Sales and awards ===
Golden Sun was a commercial success, and sold 740,000 copies in the United States and another 338,000 in Japan. It was followed by Golden Sun: The Lost Age in 2002, and Golden Sun: Dark Dawn in 2010. Golden Sun was re-released for the Virtual Console via the Wii U eShop in April 2014, and was released for the Nintendo Classics service in January 2024.

Golden Sun won "Handheld Game of the Year" at the 2002 Golden Joystick Awards. During the 5th Annual Interactive Achievement Awards, the Academy of Interactive Arts & Sciences nominated Golden Sun in the "Hand-Held Game of the Year" and "Console Role-Playing" categories. It was a nominee in GameSpot's annual "Best Game Boy Advance Game" in 2001 and, among console games, "Best Role-Playing Game" award categories. Golden Sun was ranked 94 on IGN's Readers Choice Top 100 games ever. The publication later named the title the 24th-best Game Boy Advance game of all time. It was rated the 31st best game made on a Nintendo system in Nintendo Power's Top 200 Games list. In 2023, Time Extension included the game on their "Best JRPGs of All Time" list.
