= Golden Sun =

Series of fantasy role-playing video games

- Golden Sun's logo as of Golden Sun: Dark Dawn
- Genre: Role-playing video game
- Developer: Camelot Software Planning
- Publisher: Nintendo
- Creators: Hiroyuki Takahashi; Shugo Takahashi
- Artist: Shin Yamanouchi
- Composer: Motoi Sakuraba
- Platforms: Game Boy Advance, Nintendo DS
- First release: Golden Sun; August 1, 2001
- Latest release: Golden Sun: Dark Dawn; October 28, 2010

Golden Sun (Note: Japanese: 黄金の太陽, Hepburn: Ōgon no Taiyō) is a series of fantasy role-playing video games developed by Camelot Software Planning and published by Nintendo. It follows the story of a group of magically attuned "adepts" who are charged with preventing the potentially destructive power of alchemy from being released as it was in the past. Players navigate characters through the game's world by defeating enemies, solving puzzles, and completing assigned missions to complete the storyline.

The original two games, Golden Sun and Golden Sun: The Lost Age, were released in 2001 and 2002, respectively, for the Game Boy Advance. A third game, Golden Sun: Dark Dawn, was released for the Nintendo DS in 2010. In Golden Sun, the player controls protagonist Isaac and his companions as they journey through the world of Weyard to prevent a group of anti-heroes from releasing a mysterious power called "Alchemy" to the world. Golden Sun: The Lost Age follows the surviving members from the previous game's antagonists as they continue to pursue the release of Alchemy by lighting four elemental lighthouses. Golden Sun: Dark Dawn takes place thirty years later and follows the descendants of the previous two games' heroes as they navigate a world adapting to the presence of Alchemy.

The series has received generally favorable reception from critics. The first Golden Sun game has been widely lauded as among the best games for the Game Boy Advance, with the first game receiving Nintendo Power's Best GBA Game of 2001 and ranking in IGN's Readers Choice Top 100 games ever, as number 94. The Lost Age performed even better than its predecessor, ranking 78 on IGN's Readers Choice Top 100 games ever. Dark Dawn, while still scoring highly on Metacritic's aggregation of critic scores, was less well received. Sales figures for the first two Golden Sun games exceeded one million in the United States and Japan, a figure that Dark Dawn failed to exceed.

== Common elements ==
Release timeline
2001	Golden Sun
2002	Golden Sun: The Lost Age
2003
2004
2005
2006
2007
2008
2009
2010	Golden Sun: Dark Dawn

=== Setting ===
Games in the Golden Sun series are set in the fictional world of Weyard, a flat and vaguely circular plane whose oceans perpetually spill off the edge of the world into what is seemingly an endless abyss. The first two installments, Golden Sun and The Lost Age, center around two groups of magically attuned "adepts" who are alternately charged with achieving and preventing the release of the potentially destructive power of Alchemy on the world. The force of Alchemy was prevalent in Weyard's ancient past, allowing for the development of great civilizations, but this eventually caused worldwide conflict that subsided only after it was sealed away. The keys to unlocking Alchemy, four magic jewels called the Elemental Stars, had been hidden within the mountain shrine, Mt. Aleph, guarded by the town of Vale at the mountain's base over time. The third installment, Dark Dawn, chronicles the events of Weyard thirty years following the return of Alchemy and the struggles the world's inhabitants face while adapting to their new reality.

=== Gameplay ===
Psynergy, a form of magic within the Golden Sun games, is used to solve puzzles and reach new locations. Here, a cold spell is used to create a navigable path of frozen ice pillars from puddles of water.

In the Golden Sun games, players control a cast of characters as they journey through a fantasy world, interact with other characters, battle monsters, acquire magic spells and equipment, and take part in a narrative. Much of the time spent outside of battle takes place in dungeons, caves, and other locales, which generally require the player to find items that grant their bearer new forms of "Psynergy", the series' version of magic, to solve puzzles. To complete these puzzles, players must either push pillars to construct negotiable paths between elevated areas, climb up and rappel down cliffs, or obtain a special item to progress through the story and game world. Outside of these dungeons and locales, the player traverses through a world map and navigates between forests, rivers, mountain ranges, seas, and oceans.

A key element of in-game exploration is the use of Psynergy spells, which are used both in battle and solving puzzles. Some Psynergy is only used in combat or in the overworld and non-battle scenarios. However, there is Psynergy that can be used in both situations; for example, the "Whirlwind" spell can be used to damage enemies in battle and out of battle to clear overgrown foliage that blocks the player's path. The player gains more Psynergy spells as the game progresses, both through leveling up and obtaining special Psynergy-bestowing items. With each "utility" Psynergy spell, the party gains access to more locations and secrets in the game world.

In battle, Golden Sun games contain both random monster encounters, featuring randomly selected enemies, and compulsory battles involving set enemies, which advance the story. When a battle begins, a separate screen is brought up where the player's party and enemy party face off on opposing sides. During battles in the first two games, the characters and the background rotate to give a pseudo-3D effect. Players can attack enemies directly using various weapons and offensive Psynergy spells, or by summoning Djinn, powerful otherworldly entities that enhance an attached character's hit points, Psynergy points, and other statistics, as well as determining what Psynergy they can perform. Djinn can be set to standby, where players forfeit stat enhancements to unleash a powerful one-time attack that summons an elemental monster to inflict damage on all enemies.

== Plot ==
=== Golden Sun and The Lost Age ===
Three years prior to the start of the game's main story, Saturos and Menardi raid Mt. Aleph intending to steal the Elemental Stars, but fail to solve the riddles guarding them and are driven away by the mountain's trap; a magically generated thunderstorm and rock slide.

Three years later, Isaac, Garet, and Jenna join Kraden on his research trip to Mt. Aleph and manage to solve the shrine's puzzles and retrieve the Elemental Stars. They are ambushed by Saturos and Menardi, along with Felix, a previous resident of Vale who was kidnapped during the storms three years earlier. They kidnap Jenna and Kraden and take three of the four Elemental Stars, then depart to light the four lighthouses and release Alchemy on the world. Isaac's party is joined by two other young Adepts, Ivan and Mia, and together they pursue Saturos' party in a journey that spans two continents, culminating in a fierce battle that leads to Saturos and Menardi's death.

With Saturos and Menardi dead, Felix convinces Jenna and Kraden to join him in completing Saturos' original objective to activate the two remaining lighthouses that he failed to light. Joined by new companions Sheba and Piers, Felix and his party embark on a new expedition while pursued by Isaac's party. Eventually, Felix's party is able to access the legendary, secluded Atlantis-like society of Lemuria, located far out in the ocean. After convening with Lemuria's ancient king, Hydros, they learn of Alchemy's true nature: it is the sustenance of Weyard's life force, and its absence has caused the world's continents to decrease in size and parts of the world to collapse into the abyss. Armed with this new information, Felix manages to persuade Isaac and his party to join them, and together they fulfill the goal of releasing Alchemy and preventing Weyard's eventual decay.

=== Dark Dawn ===
Thirty years after Isaac and his party of Adepts return the power of Alchemy to Weyard, continents have shifted, new countries have emerged, and new species have appeared. However, Psynergy Vortexes, which suck the elemental Psynergy from both the land and the power-wielding Adepts, are appearing all over Weyard. The original games' heroes' descendants – Matthew, Karis, Rief, and Tyrell – set out to solve the mystery of the vortexes while facing a world adapting to the constant presence of Psynergy.

The game begins with Tyrell accidentally crashing one of Ivan's inventions, a Soarwing, and Isaac sending him out along with Matthew and Karis to retrieve a feather of the mountain roc to build a new one. After meeting up with Kraden, Rief, and Nowell, they are ambushed by Blados, Chalis, and Arcanus, and the party is separated. As Matthew's party travels across Weyard to reunite with Kraden and Nowell, they encounter a deadly eclipse heralded by the lighting of Luna Tower, causing suffering and destruction across the world. They manage to activate an ancient machine called the Apollo's Lens to end the eclipse, and return home to discover a large Psynergy Vortex lurking ominously near their home.

== Development ==
=== Conception ===
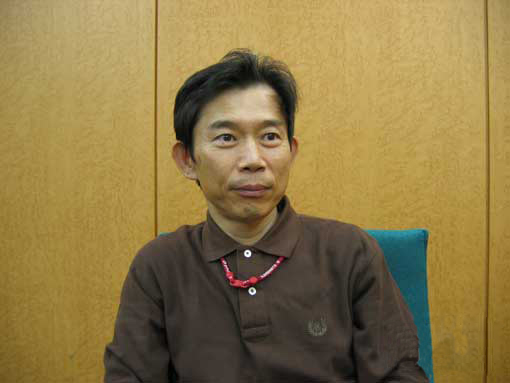
Hiroyuki Takahashi conceived of and developed the Golden Sun games alongside his brother, Shugo Takahashi.

The Golden Sun games were created by the Takahashi Brothers, consisting of Hiroyuki Takahashi and Shugo Takahashi, and produced by Camelot Software Planning. According to co-creator Shugo Takahashi, the series was conceived as a way for Nintendo to compete against Sony's PlayStation console, which dominated the role-playing game market at the time. As a handheld title, Golden Sun was originally planned as a single game, but due to both the hardware limitations of putting the entire game on a single Game Boy Advance cartridge and the developers' own desire for what they wanted to do with the game, it was expanded to become two successive games, Golden Sun and Golden Sun: The Lost Age. The Takahashi Brothers had previously designed Shining Force III, where the story involved playing through the perspectives of both the "good" side and the "bad" side of the characters. Thinking that it was an effective way of conveying the full story of a fictional game world, they incorporated elements of this storytelling methodology into the two-game setup of the Golden Sun series, having the player control the "good guys" in Golden Sun and members of the antagonistic party in The Lost Age.

=== History ===
Originally, Camelot planned to create a single title instead of a series, and in the extremely early stages of their project they had created a game design document for the one Golden Sun game to be on the Nintendo 64 console. When it became apparent the N64 was to be superseded by the GameCube, Camelot shifted their focus to making a game on the handheld Game Boy Advance.

Golden Sun games generally have longer development cycles than their peer games on similar consoles due to the series' complex gameplay mechanisms and storylines. Golden Sun, the first game in the series, underwent a development cycle of between twelve and eighteen months by Camelot Software Planning, which is considered a long period of time for the development of a handheld video game, and was described as a "testament" to the positive results a long development cycle can bring to a game. It was shown in early, playable form at the Nintendo Space World Expo in Japan in August 2000. North American previewers received the game a few weeks before the release, and IGN noted that the experience of developing Shining Force for Sega helped Camelot develop a gripping RPG for the handheld.

The Lost Age was first revealed to Japan in early 2002, with the magazine Famitsu being the first publication to review the game. The Lost Age was highly anticipated; it topped IGN's list of Game Boy Advance "Most Wanted" games for 2003. The North American version of the game was playable at Electronic Entertainment Expo 2002, and IGN noted that the opening of the game did away with the slow opening sequence of Golden Sun, introducing the characters in between the action. GameSpot previewed a localized copy of The Lost Age in February 2003, and noted that the game built on its predecessor's graphics engine, with "the environments in the game featuring rich detail with little touches— such as birds that fly off as you approach."

Golden Sun: Dark Dawn was first revealed and introduced at the Nintendo E3 2009 conference by Nintendo of America president, Reggie Fils-Aimé, as a series that "went dark six years ago" but has since been revisited and polished up for the Nintendo DS. The game received a larger development team than previous installments, giving the team luxuries such as visiting UNESCO World Heritage Sites for inspiration.

In an interview with Nintendo Gamer in June 2012, series producer Hiroyuki Takahashi spoke about the possibility of a fourth Golden Sun game; "A big reason for us making RPGs comes from the requests from all the people who have enjoyed our RPGs in the past. Perhaps if there are enough Nintendo users asking for another game in the Golden Sun series, then this will naturally lead to the development of such a game."

On January 11, 2024, it was announced that Golden Sun and The Lost Age would be added to Nintendo Switch Online on January 17.

=== Music ===
The series' original music was composed by Motoi Sakuraba, and his score for the first game in his series was his first attempt at composing music for the Game Boy Advance. The new technology offered by the console encouraged Sakuraba to attempt new styles, resulting in subtle rock influences in the series' music The collection of orchestral pieces that Sakuraba contributed to the series include an overworld theme, several battle themes that play during fight sequences, and a variety of individual themes for the games' various towns and other locales. Sakuraba returned to score both The Lost Age and Dark Dawn, with the latter released on a new platform with updated hardware. According to Sakuraba, the "sound design" for Dark Dawn was different and he preferred the music in the first two games. He has also expressed a desire for an official soundtrack release of the series' music.

Sakuraba also contributed songs to two games in the Super Smash Bros. franchise, among which two were adapted from his works in The Lost Age and Dark Dawn.

== In other media ==
=== Manga ===
The characters from the first Golden Sun game also appear in a self-published doujinshi manga titled "Golden Sun 4-Koma Gag Battle", drawn by various artists and published by Kobunsha. It was released four months after the first game came out and is not officially sanctioned by either Nintendo or Camelot. As a result, the manga was only released in Japan.

=== Super Smash Bros. series ===
Elements from the Golden Sun games have appeared in other games. Isaac, the main protagonist of the original game, is an unlockable "Assist Trophy" in Super Smash Bros. Brawl. When he is summoned during battle, Isaac uses Psynergy to conjure a large hand three times in succession to shove the player's opponents off the stage. If enemies attempt to evade his attack, Isaac will turn in sync to attack a selected opponent. In addition, a medley of music from The Lost Age was selected to be on Brawl's soundtrack. The game's sequel, Super Smash Bros. for Nintendo 3DS and Wii U, did not feature Isaac as an Assist Trophy, but its music featured The Lost Age medley as well as the world map theme from Dark Dawn. Super Smash Bros. Ultimate brings back Isaac as an Assist Trophy and introduces a costume inspired by him for the Mii Swordfighter. The game also features characters from all three titles as spirits, including the adult Isaac from Dark Dawn.

== Reception ==
Aggregate review scores
Game	GameRankings	Metacritic
Golden Sun	89%	91/100
Golden Sun: The Lost Age	87%	86/100
Golden Sun: Dark Dawn	81%	79/100

The original game sold 740,000 copies in the United States and 338,000 in Japan, while The Lost Age sold 437,000 and 249,000 units in the United States and Japan, respectively. In total, both games sold 1.65 million and 1.12 million respectively, with European sales contributing 572,000 and 434,000. By the end of 2012, two years after its release, Dark Dawn only sold 80,000 units in Japan.

The series was met with many positive reviews. Reviewers praised the series' vibrant graphics, high-quality sound, and varied, refined RPG gameplay, with particular optimism on the Djinn-based gameplay system and Battle aspect despite the fact that the original two games were limited to the 32-bit cartridge. GamePro raved that Golden Sun was "A huge, fantastic, creative, and wickedly fun RPG that doesn't seem to care that it's 'just' on a GBA," while they praised that The Lost Age's eye-popping magic effects are beautiful even by console standards. IGN, meanwhile, praised the plot's intricate structure, saying that it "has been so tightly integrated into every ounce of the adventure... such a rich and deep plot that it's almost easy to get lost if you're not paying attention." 1UP praised Dark Dawn as being a huge step forward in terms of pacing and graphics compared to the previous games.

1UP faulted Camelot for being unwilling to "trim its fat", and noted that all three games in the series "tend to ramble on anytime dialogue boxes start to show up. Its heroes and villains have an uncanny knack for saying incredibly simple things with about three or four times the words they actually need to convey those ideas." Game Informer noted that the difficulty of Dark Dawn was greatly dumbed down compared to previous installments and complained that "characters level up at blazing speeds" while the Djinn make "even the longest boss battles a cakewalk."

In 2001, Golden Sun won the Nintendo Power Award for best Game Boy Advance game of the year. Golden Sun was ranked 94 and The Lost Age was ranked 78 on IGN's Readers Choice Top 100 games ever. In 2007, Golden Sun was named 24th best Game Boy Advance game of all time in IGN's feature reflecting on the Game Boy Advance's long lifespan, and its Game of the Month for April 2003 due to its "amazing graphics and sound presentation, as well as a quest that lasts for more than thirty hours."
