= The Nostalgia of the Infinite =

Painting by Giorgio de Chirico

- La nostalgia dell'infinito (Italian)
- Artist: Giorgio de Chirico
- Year: c. 1912–1913 (dated 1911)
- Catalogue: 78738
- Medium: Oil on canvas
- Dimensions: 135.2 cm × 64.8 cm (53 1/4 in × 25 1/2 in)
- Location: Museum of Modern Art, New York
- Accession: 87.1936

The Nostalgia of the Infinite (Italian: La nostalgia dell'infinito) is a painting by Italian metaphysical painter Giorgio de Chirico, dated of 1911, but most likely painted in 1912–13.

The subject of the painting is a large tower. The scene is struck by low, angular evening light. In the foreground below the tower are two small shadowy figures resembling those in future works by Salvador Dalí. This painting is the most famous example of the tower theme which appears in several of Chirico's works.

Although the painting is dated 1911, this date is generally held in question. It has been speculated by the Museum of Modern Art in New York City that it was created from 1912 to 1913, while the Annenberg School for Communication suggests 1913–14. According to art historian Robert Hughes, the painting draws inspiration from the Mole Antonelliana in Turin, Italy.

This painting, amongst other works by Giorgio de Chirico, influenced the painting by Fumito Ueda used for the front cover of the Japanese and European versions of the video game Ico.

== See also ==
- The Great Tower, a later version of the same composition
