= Fumito Ueda =

Japanese video game designer (born 1970)

- 上田 文人
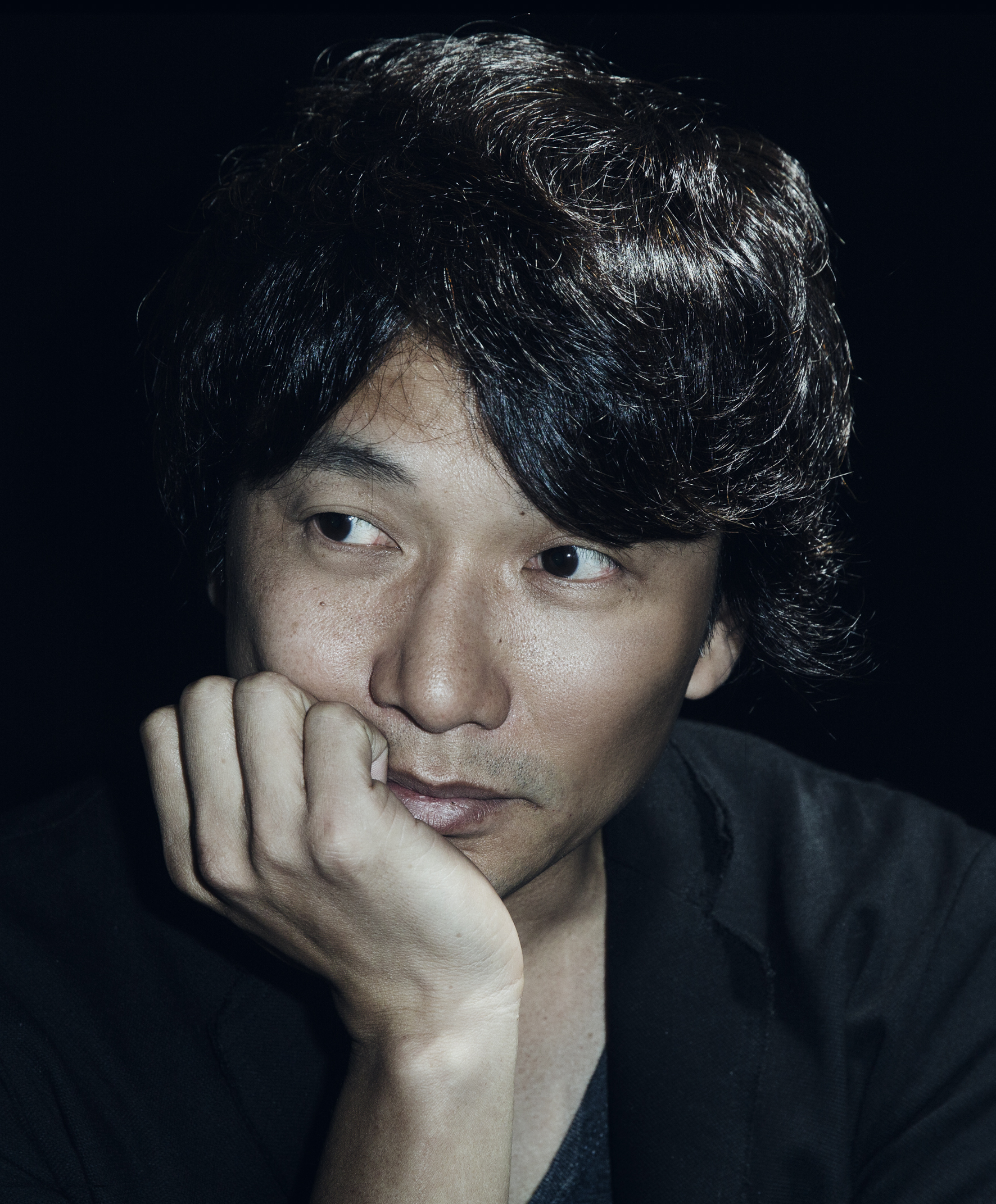
- Ueda in 2016
- Born: April 19, 1970 (age 56); Tatsuno, Hyōgo, Japan
- Occupations: Game director, screenwriter, game designer
- Years active: 1996–present
- Employer: Sony Computer Entertainment (1997–2011)
- Notable work: Ico; Shadow of the Colossus; The Last Guardian

Fumito Ueda (上田 文人, Ueda Fumito; born April 19, 1970) is a Japanese video game designer, game director and visual artist. Ueda is best known as the director and lead designer of Ico (2001) and Shadow of the Colossus (2005) during his tenure at Sony Computer Entertainment's Japan Studio, and The Last Guardian (2016) through his own development company GenDesign. His games have achieved cult status and are distinguished by their usage of minimal plot and scenario using fictional languages, and use of overexposed, desaturated light. He has been described by some as an auteur.

== Early life ==
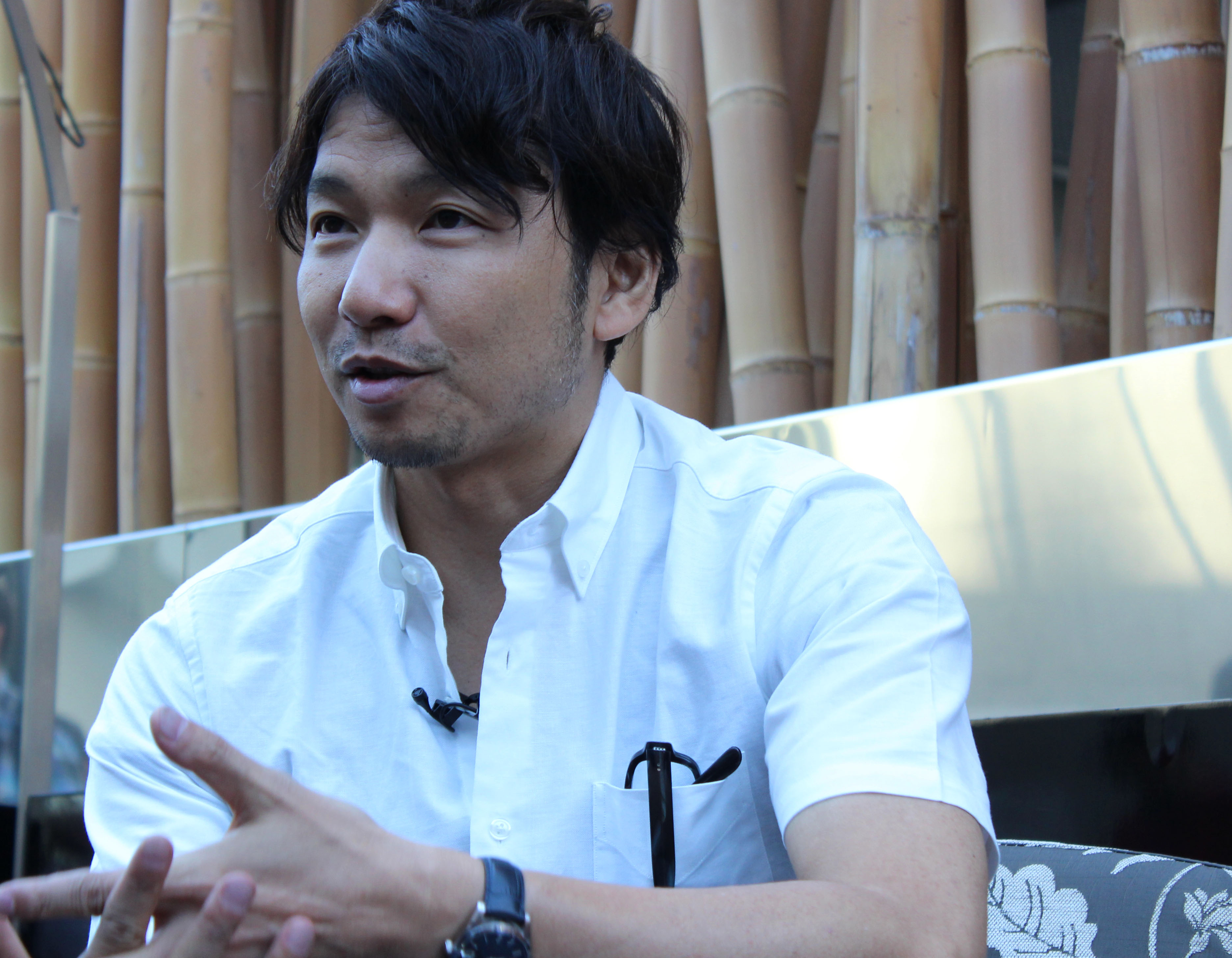
Ueda in 2017

Born on April 19, 1970, in Tatsuno, Ueda graduated from the Osaka University of Arts in 1993. In 1995, after trying to make a living as a visual artist, Ueda decided to pursue a career in the video game industry. He joined the developer Warp and worked as an animator on the game Enemy Zero for the Sega Saturn under the director Kenji Eno. He described his time there as "arduous", as the game was behind schedule and everyone on the project had to work more than normal to meet the release deadline. Eno, who also owned the company, did not think he was that great a digital artist, but handpicked Ueda because of his talent with concepts and design. Ueda worked at WARP for a year and a half.

== Career ==
=== Sony Computer Entertainment ===
In 1997, Ueda joined Sony Computer Entertainment Japan. He began work on Ico, being granted his own unit as the studio had little experience in developing games on their own (mostly the Ape Escape series) due to their focus on assisting third-party developers. After Ico, Ueda and his small team started work on Shadow of the Colossus.

In February 2007, Japanese gaming magazine Famitsu reported that Ueda and his team were working on a game for the PlayStation 3. No details about the unnamed title were revealed. In 2008, in the August edition of PlayStation Magazine, Sony Worldwide Studios boss Shuhei Yoshida commented that both Ico and Shadow of the Colossus took 4 years to develop as a hint that the game was under production, but was not close to release. The game was revealed at E3 2009 as The Last Guardian, the trailer for which suggests a saga involving elements of both Ico and Shadow of the Colossus wherein a young boy resembling Ico partners up with a colossus-sized companion to complete puzzles. Ueda later confirmed The Last Guardian to be related to the two previous installments.

In an interview with G4tv.com in 2009 he expressed admiration for the method of cut-scene story-telling in Valve's Half-Life 2, and when questioned directly expressed an interest in making a first-person game.

=== GenDesign ===
The logo for GenDesign

Ueda left Sony in December 2011, although he remained under contract to finish work on The Last Guardian. Around mid-2014, he formed GenDesign (stylized as genDESIGN), made up of former members from his team to help complete development of The Last Guardian. At E3 2015, The Last Guardian was announced for release on October 25, 2016, but was later delayed to December 6, 2016.

In September 2018, Ueda revealed that the studio was at the prototyping stage of designing a new game, supported with funding from the investment fund Kowloon Nights. In March 2020, Epic Games announced that they would be fully funding development, with the two companies splitting profits in half.

At the 2024 Game Awards the first teaser for the game was revealed, then codenamed "Project Robot". The full title, genATLAS, was revealed at Summer Game Fest 2026, alongside the first full trailer.

== Influences and style ==
He described himself as a very inquisitive child saying "I enjoyed catching and keeping living things, such as fish or birds. Other than that, I liked both watching and making animation. Basically, I seemed to be interested in things that moved." Among his favorite subjects in school was art. He commented, "If I was not in the games industry, I would want to become a classical artist. Though I regard not only games but also anything that expresses something – be it films, novels or manga – as forms of art."

Ueda played many Sega Mega Drive games, which influenced his work. He was also a fan of the Amiga computer platform games Flashback and Another World during his teen years. Other games that influenced his work include The Legend of Zelda, Virtua Fighter, and Prince of Persia. He was also influenced by the work of Kenji Eno, and the manga series Galaxy Express 999 (1977–1981).

Ueda's games are considered to have a distinctive style, which Ueda himself describes as "design by subtraction", with sparse landscapes, oversaturated lighting and minimalist story to give his games a personal and distinctive feel. Ueda also said that, in video games, ideas for a gameplay mechanic should be made first, then complemented by a game's story. In 2008, IGN ranked Ueda as one of their top 100 game creators of all time, saying that his knack for "creating atmospheric puzzle playgrounds with mute or near-mute characters instills a sense of isolation, yet provides an endearing feeling of hope as the protagonists seek simply to find an exodus or redemption from their weather-worn, ornate prisons".

== Works ==
Year	Game title	Role
1996	D no Shokutaku: Director's Cut	Animator
1997	Enemy Zero	CGI animator
2001	Ico	Director, game designer, key animator, character designer
2005	Shadow of the Colossus	Director, game designer, writer
2016	The Last Guardian	Director, producer, game designer, narrative designer
TBA	Gen Atlas	Director
