= The Great Tower =

1921 painting by Giorgio de Chirico

- La grande torre (Italian)
- Artist: Giorgio de Chirico
- Year: 1921
- Medium: Oil on canvas
- Dimensions: 83.5 cm × 62 cm (32.9 in × 24 in)
- Location: Pushkin Museum, Moscow

The Great Tower (Italian: La grande torre) is an oil on canvas painting by the Italian artist Giorgio de Chirico, from 1921. It is held in the Pushkin Museum, in Moscow. The Russian Ministry of Culture acquired it in 1992 for the National Centre for Contemporary Arts, though the latter then transferred it to the Pushkin Museum in honour of its eightieth anniversary.

== Description ==
This painting is a variant of the larger-format composition The Nostalgia of the Infinite, from c. 1913. In it, as in many of his works, de Chirico introduces the viewer into a metaphysical world of imagery and symbols. The painting depicts a tall tower standing on a large sand dune, illuminated by the evening sun. Behind the tower there is a steppe landscape, with orange-brown dunes, small houses that look like barns, and sparse vegetation. In the foreground are two people, of small since, that seem insignificant in comparison to the tower. Above all this stretches a heavy and oppressive sky, the color of which smoothly changes from yellow-green at the horizon to dark blue above the top of the tower. The landscape in the painting is momentary, creating a sense of stopped time, characteristic of the works of the artist.
