= The Last Guardian =

2016 video game

- Developers: Japan Studio; GenDesign
- Publisher: Sony Interactive Entertainment
- Director: Fumito Ueda
- Producers: Kazunobu Sato; Fumito Ueda
- Designer: Masanobu Tanaka
- Programmer: Makoto Izawa
- Artists: Shunpei Suzuki; Yutaro Sakai
- Writers: Fumito Ueda; Masami Tanji; Yuta Kimura
- Composer: Takeshi Furukawa
- Platform: PlayStation 4
- Release: 6 December 2016
- Genre: Action-adventure
- Mode: Single-player

The Last Guardian (Note: Known as Hitokui no Ōwashi Trico (人喰いの大鷲トリコ, Hitokui no Ōwashi Toriko; "Trico the Large Man-Eating Eagle") in Japan.) is a 2016 action-adventure game developed by Japan Studio and GenDesign and published by Sony Interactive Entertainment for the PlayStation 4. Players control a boy who befriends a giant legendary creature named Trico; the two must work together to escape the dangerous ruins of an ancient civilization.

Team Ico began developing The Last Guardian in 2007. It was designed and directed by Fumito Ueda, and shares stylistic, thematic, and gameplay elements with his previous games, Ico (2001) and Shadow of the Colossus (2005). He employed the "design through subtraction" approach he had used for his previous games, removing elements that did not contribute to the core theme of the connection between the boy and Trico.

Sony announced The Last Guardian at E3 2009 with a planned release in 2011 for the PlayStation 3. It suffered numerous delays; Ueda and other Team Ico members departed Sony, forming the studio GenDesign, and hardware difficulties moved the game to the PlayStation 4 in 2012, drawing speculation that it would not see release. Ueda and GenDesign remained as creative consultants, with Ueda as director and Sony's Japan Studio handling technical development. The Last Guardian was reintroduced at E3 2015. Upon release, it received praise for its art direction, story, and depiction of Trico, though some criticized the gameplay.

== Gameplay ==
Like its predecessors Ico (2001) and Shadow of the Colossus (2005), The Last Guardian is a third-person game that combines action-adventure and puzzle elements. The player controls an unnamed boy who must cooperate with a half-bird-half-mammal creature to solve puzzles and explore areas. The name of the creature, Trico (トリコ, Toriko), can be taken to mean "prisoner" (虜, toriko), "baby bird" (鳥の子, tori no ko), or a portmanteau of "bird" (鳥, tori) and "cat" (猫, neko).

The boy can climb on structures, carry objects such as barrels, and operate mechanisms such as levers. Trico's size and agility allow it to reach areas that the boy cannot reach alone, and fight off guards who attempt to capture the boy. Conversely, certain obstacles, such as gates, or glass eyes that frighten Trico, prevent Trico from progressing, and must be removed by the boy. The boy must locate barrels to feed Trico when it is hungry, pet Trico to calm it after a battle, and remove spears thrown at Trico by enemies.

Though the player initially has little command over Trico, the boy learns to command Trico to leap onto ledges or head in a certain direction, among other actions. Although players are encouraged to train Trico to move in the right direction, new areas can be discovered by letting Trico wander independently. At various points, the boy wields a reflective mirror that summons lightning from Trico's tail, which can be used to break certain objects.

The player is returned to the last checkpoint if the boy is captured by guards, or if he falls from too great a height. Multiple playthroughs unlock additional costumes based on previous Ueda games.

== Plot ==
The player controls the boy, who must care for and work with the large creature, Trico, using its animal instincts to solve puzzles.

The Last Guardian's story is framed as a flashback told by an older man (voiced by Hiroshi Shirokuma) recounting his experience as a boy.

The boy (voiced by Tatsuki Ishikawa) awakens in a ruined castle in a deep valley known as the Nest. He discovers an enormous creature called a Trico, chained and wounded. Though Trico is hostile, after the boy removes the spears from its body and feeds it, it begins to accept him. The boy unchains Trico and they explore the area, discovering a mirror-like shield that summons lightning-like energy from Trico's tail. The pair make their way through the castle ruins, evading the ghostly soldiers, and Trico's broken horns and wings slowly regrow.

In a flashback, Trico flies to the boy's village and steals him from his dormitory. It flies back to the Nest, but is struck by lightning and chained up by the soldiers. In the present, Trico resuscitates the boy after a cave collapse. After fending off an attack from a second, armored creature, Trico and the boy enter a mysterious tower and discover a malevolent force, the "master of the valley", which manipulates creatures and soldiers. It summons several creatures of the same kind as Trico, which regurgitate stolen children into the tower and savage Trico, tearing off the end of its tail. The boy uses the mirror to summon energy from the severed tail segment and destroy the master of the valley, causing the creatures to plummet from the sky.

Wounded, Trico takes the boy, near-death, and flies to his village. When the terrified villagers attack him the boy instructs Trico to leave. Years later, the boy, now grown, discovers the shield and raises it to the sky, sending a beam of light to the Nest, where Trico resides and appears to have had a child since.

== Development ==
In his previous game, Shadow of the Colossus, director Fumito Ueda had intended to create an emotional interaction between Mono, the character that Wander wants to save, and the colossi that Wander must fight to save her. He was surprised and inspired to find players felt a stronger connection between Wander and his horse Agro. Ueda wanted to make the relationship between a human and a beast the central concept for his next game.

Ueda found that people were drawn to games with lifelike creatures, and felt The Last Guardian needed something similar to attract a broad audience. He wanted to create a virtual creature that behaved as realistically as possible, avoiding the unnatural behavior of other virtual animals. He based much of Trico's behavior on his childhood experiences growing up in a home full of animals. The final version of Trico is an amalgam of several creatures; the design was "deliberately unbalanced because looking strange was important", according to Ueda. The team wanted to avoid making the animal cute, and instead focused on realistic-looking behavior with "animal-like expressions". Trico's ears react with a cat-like "twitch" if they touch ceilings or other tall features, using mesh-based collision detection. The team added the ability to summon lightning from Trico's tail to have players understand Trico's "force and ferocity". Ueda described Trico as "adolescent", allowing the developers to add humor through its actions. The team used programmed key frame animations instead of more common motion capture techniques, allowing them to capture subtleties that would be difficult using live animal subjects.

As Trico functions similarly to the colossi the player climbs in Shadow of the Colossus, journalists have described The Last Guardian as a combination of Ico and Shadow of the Colossus; Ueda stated there was "a bit of each of those [games] in there". He described the relationship between the boy, Trico, and the guards as a game of rock-paper-scissors that changes throughout the game; at times, the boy needs Trico to protect him, while at others the situation is reversed. Though Ico and Shadow of the Colossus have a similar changing connection between pairs of characters, Ueda said there was more "dynamic range" in The Last Guardian.

The Last Guardian is the first Team Ico game to use voice-over narration. As much of the game relies on non-verbal communication between the boy and Trico, Ueda felt the voice-over helped immerse the player in the mindset of the boy. It also provided a way to provide gameplay hints and other context to the player.

Whereas the team had designed the areas of previous games for the characters they had designed in advance, for The Last Guardian they made Trico as flexible as possible, allowing them to create levels and have Trico adapt to them. The size difference and interactions between the boy and Trico were informed by the limitations of the PlayStation; if the characters were of the same size, the team would have needed to determine the animation interactions for both, whereas Trico's size meant the boy's animations would not need to affect him much.

Although the boy is less detailed than Trico, he was animated via key frame animation. He places hands on nearby walls, and reaches to pet Trico without player interaction. Ueda felt these animations were necessary to help convince the player of the game world. The animation system uses layers of animation that mimic real-life physics, taking advantage of the greater processing power of the PlayStation 4. The team considered making the player character a girl, but felt it would not be realistic that a female character would have enough stamina to climb Trico.

To create the art and architecture, the team used the same "design through subtraction" method they had used to develop Ico and Shadow of the Colossus, removing elements they felt distracted from the core experience. Music is used sparingly to highlight key emotional moments, such as when Trico uses his tail to catch the boy as he falls from a collapsing platform. The game uses vertical space to emphasize the boy's small size.

The Last Guardian game engine builds on the team's previous development of A.I. processing from Ico and transformative collisions from Shadow of the Colossus. It is the first Team Ico game to use a full physics engine, Havok. According to Ueda, the effect of wind was modeled separately for each of Trico's feathers. Yasuhide Kobayashi, vice president of Japan Studio, stated that the title The Last Guardian was chosen to appeal to the larger demographic markets in the United States and Europe for the PlayStation 3, hoping to avoid the cultural problems in title and artwork blamed for Ico's low sales in western countries.

In August 2019 interview Fumito Ueda mentioned that Trico they were creating on PlayStation 3 actually had more motion patterns than the PlayStation 4 version did, as they were unable to transfer everything due to transition time issues.

=== Technical development ===
Ueda had ideas for The Last Guardian around 2005 after completing Shadow of the Colossus. it entered active development in 2007, a year after the release of the PlayStation 3. The working title was Project Trico, revealed to the public due to a leaked video posted at PlayStation Lifestyle in 2008 that showed the current "Target Render" of the game at that time. Ueda had long considered the development time for Ico and Shadow of the Colossus, and had anticipated being able "to create something good in a short period of time" with The Last Guardian at the onset. By 2009, the development team had completed enough of the game for it to be showcased during the E3 2009, using an improved render of the same set pieces previously seen in the Target Render and later provided a short vertical slice of the game to the press for the Game Developers Conference in early March 2011. Ueda had considered including this demo on the then-upcoming remastered The Ico & Shadow of the Colossus Collection, though it was ultimately not included.

Behind the scenes, the development of The Last Guardian was considered slow by Shuhei Yoshida, the president of Sony Computer Entertainment Worldwide. Yoshida explained that the vision for The Last Guardian was based on a video prepared by Ueda to demonstrate the concepts and style, a process Ueda had used for Ico, and Sony wanted to stay true to that vision. Team Ico, which is a small studio compared to other Sony studios in Japan or other Western developers, were struggling with achieving Ueda's vision for the game on the PlayStation 3 hardware. In 2015 Yoshida revealed that the previous 2009 trailer was "specced up", running at a much lower frame rate on the PlayStation 3 and sped up for the presentation. Around 2011, Sony brought in many of their core development teams such as Santa Monica Studios to review the code and try to improve the performance. In 2012, with Sony preparing to announce the PlayStation 4 and still recognizing the sluggish development of the PlayStation 3 version of the game, it was decided to change the target platform to the PlayStation 4 so that Ueda's concept could be fully realized. Ueda stated that this choice was primarily Sony's decision, speculating that the PlayStation 3 version of the game at this point would still have been sufficient to convey his concept. Following the target platform switch, Ueda and other members of Team Ico were not as involved with the process, as other teams worked to take the highly customized PlayStation 3 code to adapt it to the PlayStation 4; this included the help of PlayStation 4 lead architect Mark Cerny. With the reintroduction of the game at the E3 2015, Yoshida explained that the game engine is now fully running at speed on the PlayStation 4 and that the remainder of the development lies with the game designers to complete.

Development was hampered by Ueda's departure from Sony in December 2011. With Sony's decision to delay the release early that year, Ueda and other Sony and Team Ico employees opted to leave Sony. Ueda stated in 2013 interview that his departure from Sony was due to feeling "a sense of crisis within myself about a lot of things" on news of the delay. Some of those that departed Sony went on to other projects. For example, executive producer Yoshifusa Hayama joined Bossa Studios to work on social/mobile games, while two Team Ico artists joined an indie startup studio Friends & Foes to develop their first game, Vane, which has been compared visually to The Last Guardian. Ueda and other former Team Ico members, including Jinji Horagai, the lead programmer from Ico and Shadow of the Colossus, created a new studio, GenDesign. In founding the studio, they were faced with a choice, according to Ueda: "Do we try to create something new, or do we keep going, providing support on The Last Guardian?" GenDesign opted to commit themselves to helping Sony complete The Last Guardian through contract and working alongside Sony's internal studio, Japan Studio. Under this arrangement, GenDesign developed the creative content, such as character design and animation and level design, which was then put into place via Japan Studio, with Ueda maintaining oversight on the completed project.

Ueda stated that the final game, as of June 2016, still represents the initial vision he had for The Last Guardian at its onset. The transition from the PlayStation 3 to 4 only improved how the game looked, but did not change how it played. Ueda stressed it was important during the extended development cycle to keep the question "what kind of game do I want to play?" at the forefront, and to remember that the game needed to be targeted at players experiencing it for the first time rather than developers that had played it through over and over. Digital Foundry, comparing the game from its initial Target Render from 2008, the 2009 trailer, the 2015 trailer, and the final game, found very few changes in the structure and nature, while observing several improvements and changes made to the rendering systems.

=== Music ===
The Last Guardian's original score was written, orchestrated, conducted, and co-produced by Takeshi Furukawa. Furukawa had joined the soundtrack development around 2011, near the same time that the game was being transitioned to the PlayStation 4. Furukawa had been invited to participate by Tommy Kikuchi, the music director for Shadow of the Colossus. During the platform transition, much of the creative work had been put on hold, and Furukawa did not spend extensive effort on the composition until about 2013, three years prior to release. He completed his compositions in early 2016.

Furakawa stated that Ueda trusted him with freedom to compose the music and providing only a broad direction of a cinematic soundtrack and some specific directorial notes. While he was aware of the reputation of the soundtracks by Michiru Oshima and Kow Otani for Ico and Shadow of the Colossus, respectively, and wanted to have The Last Guardian's soundtrack to be similarly unique, Furukawa opted to avoid using these previous works and instead drew his own inspirations primarily from works with a "muted aesthetic", such as Impressionist art and music and French cinema. Furakawa wanted to avoid overstating the emotional aspect, which he felt was already sufficiently conveyed through the gameplay and animation, and instead kept the music restrained except during key narrative elements or in specific locales. Furukawa did not have to adapt his score significantly to account for changes in story and game direction since these elements were still made within Ueda's vision. He worked with audio lead Tsubasa Ito frequently to review the status and use of his scored compositions.

The performance of the soundtrack was conducted by Furukawa with the London Symphony Orchestra, the Trinity Boys Choir, and London Voices, and was recorded at Lyndhurst Hall. The 19-track Composer's Choice Edition soundtrack was released digitally alongside the game on the PlayStation 4 Music App, and later on other digital retailers. A 24-track CD version of the soundtrack was released by TEAM Entertainment on 21 December 2016. In addition, a two-disc vinyl LP edition was published by iam8bit in 2017.

== Release ==
Shawn Layden formally reintroduced The Last Guardian at the beginning of Sony's E3 2015 conference. Sony affirmed that that game was now slated for release on the PlayStation 4 with a 2016 release date. Sony also assured fans that Ueda remained a main developer despite his prior departure from Sony. According to Chris Plante of Polygon, the gameplay presented shows the same gameplay from previous demos, where the young boy and the large creature work together to solve various platforming puzzles. The presentation at E3 2015 was based on the milestone of the game being fully playable, affirmed by selected members of the press, though Yoshida stated they did not do a live gameplay demo as the artificial intelligence behavior of the animal creature could be sporadic and impact the demonstration. Ueda said that the fundamentals of the gameplay had not changed from the original PlayStation 3 version to the PlayStation 4, only that with the more-powerful PlayStation 4, they were able to put more detail into the characters and the environment.

Though the demo was not playable at the 2015 Tokyo Game Show, part of Sony's display for the game including a full-screen version of Trico that would respond in real time to the actions of the attendees as captured by a PlayStation Move camera. Yoshida stated that they had not shown much additional footage since the E3 2015 announcement as they believed that The Last Guardian is story-heavy and feared showing too much beyond that the game does exist and is playable.

The Last Guardian was announced for a 25 October 2016 release in Japan and North America during Sony's presentation at E3 2016 in June, and was available in a playable form to attendees. In an interview with Kotaku during E3 2016, Ueda said the game was fully complete, and the only work remaining was fine-tuning visuals and cut-scenes. In September 2016, it was delayed to December, as the developers needed more time to fix bugs that had come up during the final production, according to Yoshida. By 21 October 2016, development concluded and the game was submitted for manufacturing. A patch for the PlayStation 4 Pro enabled high dynamic range and 4K resolution.

In addition to regular retail copies, Sony released a "collector's edition" including an artbook, a soundtrack, and a statue of a resting Trico and the boy. The week prior to release, Sony's Joe Palmer stated that pre-order numbers were "exceeding expectations", including high interest in the collector's edition. A standalone demo version of The Last Guardian was released for the PlayStation VR on 12 December 2017; the virtual reality version allows the player to experience interacting with Trico from the viewpoint of the boy. After the launch of the PlayStation 5 in November 2020, players discovered that this game runs at 60 frames per second when playing an unpatched version from the PlayStation 4 disc.

== Reception ==
Reception

Aggregate score
Aggregator	Score
Metacritic	82/100

Review scores
Publication	Score
Destructoid	8.5/10
Edge	9/10
Electronic Gaming Monthly	7.5/10
Famitsu	38/40
Game Informer	8/10
GameRevolution	3.5/5
GameSpot	9/10
GamesRadar+	4.5/5
IGN	7/10
Polygon	7.5/10
USgamer	4/5
VideoGamer.com	9/10
The Guardian	5/5
Time	5/5

The Last Guardian received "generally favorable" reviews, according to the video game review aggregator website Metacritic. Most reviewers praised the environment and story as some of its strongest elements, while the realism of the animal behavior that Trico exhibits was praised by some critics, yet others felt that the realism also hampered the gameplay causing impatience and frustration due to lack of immediate action by Trico when giving commands.

GameSpot's Pete Brown praised the characters, their relationship and the story as important aspects, noting interactions with Trico and acting very independently at times by not knowing "if it's a concerted effort to test your patience for a lovable-yet-stubborn creature". However Brown felt that it added personality to Trico and "sympathy for both characters" in addition to their development within the story and for the player, "culminating in an enrapturing series of revelations that cements your attachment to their personalities". Tom Senior of GamesRadar called Trico "the greatest AI companion in games", in addition to the subtle use of visual and audio cues to add more character and its effect on the gameplay itself.

Reviewing for The Guardian, Simon Parkin praised the design of Trico and its interactions with the world and puzzles, adding further emotional investment. He likened Trico to an "abuse survivor" due to being scared and imprisoned at the start of the game and the thoughtfulness and relationship development of its characters making it "a game, as much as anything, about rehabilitation through kindness and companionship". Chris Carter of Destructoid felt that the detail and realistic behavior of Trico and the boy were "emotive in a way that most developers wouldn't even attempt", potentially being the reason behind the long development, praising the effort put in by Fumito Ueda and the developers nonetheless. US Gamer's Jermey Parish believed that Trico as an in-game character with its own apparent volition was revolutionary in character design, and that the emotional relationship between Trico and the boy was something that could only be effectively done with the interactivity of a video game.

In contrast, Marty Sliva of IGN was critical of Trico's behavior during puzzles combined with camera controls making sections more frustrating, particularly during interiors due to the cramped nature of certain levels and the size of Trico detracting from the experience, calling it "rare to even have to think about the camera in a third-person game in 2016, but I found myself constantly being pulled out of the experience trying to wrestle with my point of view". Sliva however still felt that the game succeeded in the attachment with its characters and delivered memorable moments despite its issues. Game Revolution's James Kozanitis found that there were moments that Trico would continue with traversing the environment and performing tasks even without player input, making the act of controlling Trico at times "ineffective and unnecessary".

Reviewers also noted performance problems on default PlayStation 4 hardware. Eurogamer's Digital Foundry determined that the game ran into rendering issues and framerate drops on the PlayStation 4, while running at 1080p on the newer PlayStation 4 Pro provided a stable framerate. Philip Kollar of Polygon compared technical aspects to its predecessors release on the PlayStation 2 due to the long development across multiple generations of Sony consoles, stating that the game at times did take advantage of the PlayStation 4 hardware while in others, such as framerate and control issues made its age more noticeable. Sam Byford of The Verge commented that while framerate drops were common in Shadow of the Colossus, they were more acceptable based on the PlayStation 2 hardware of the time and the extent the game maximized out the console's hardware, while such issues on PlayStation 4 for The Last Guardian were less forgivable, making it feel like "a PS3 game that never really came together until the brute force of new hardware allowed the team to ship"; he contrasted this to Final Fantasy XV which had the game's engine rebuilt after its target platform was switched to eighth-generation consoles.

The game was named on several year-end Game of the Year lists, including The New Yorker, Engadget, GameSpot, VG247, and Polygon. A 2023 poll conducted by GQ which surveyed video game journalists across the industry listed the title as the 88th best video game of all time.

=== Reaction to delays ===
Because of the development delays in The Last Guardian and lack of updates from Sony, The Last Guardian was considered to have been in development hell over its eight-year development period. Ueda and Yoshida would regularly report progress, but the title was notably absent from major video game conventions, including E3 and the Tokyo Game Show.

Journalists also expressed concern about the potential release when The Last Guardian trademark had hit some critical milestones. In August 2012, about three years after the trademark had been filed in the United States, Sony had yet to produce a viable product under trademark law, and in February 2015, Sony failed to renew the North American trademark for The Last Guardian. Sony re-registered the trademark, noting that lack of a renewal was an administrative oversight, and the game was still in development.

Prior to the reintroduction in 2015, some journalists expressed concern if The Last Guardian would be as much a landmark game as initially seen. Evan Narcisse for the website Kotaku opined that the lengthy delay of The Last Guardian's release since the 2009 reveal may have been harming the game's relevance on the contemporary market. Narcisse considered that the landscape of games had vastly changed since 2009, during which "by-the-numbers racers, shooters and action-adventure games dominated" the market and the expected emotional impact of The Last Guardian would have made it a stand-out game. Since then, the rise of more independent games such as Papo & Yo, Bastion, The Walking Dead, and Journey had created similar experiences to The Last Guardian, according to Narcisse. Leigh Alexander of Boing Boing agreed, noting that the delay of The Last Guardian had spanned a console generation, and other emotionally filled games have been offered in lieu of The Last Guardian. GamesIndustry.biz's Rob Fahey considered that both The Last Guardian and Final Fantasy XV, which also had a protracted development cycle lasting nearly a decade, represent the last remnants of game development practices from the early 2000s, challenged by the rise of mobile gaming, independent game development, and more efficient software development practices that change the nature and role of auteurs like Ueda and Final Fantasy's Tetsuya Nomura in game development.

News writers were able to play The Last Guardian at E3 2016 and the 2016 Tokyo Game Show in the months before the release, and several expressed further concerns about the nature of the lengthy development period. Patrick Garrett, writing for VG247, found that the visuals felt flat and aged considering modern hardware capabilities, and expressed concern that while older gamers would readily purchase the game, The Last Guardian may not draw in enough newer gamers to be a commercial success. Philip Kollar for Polygon, though still impressed with the characters, graphics, and core gameplay, found controlling the character difficult and managing the game's camera tricky, elements that made the game feel like a PlayStation 2 game rather than something on modern hardware. Wired's Chris Kohler found much of the demo to require patient observation of Trico's movements and puzzle solving, which, he commented, some players would appreciate but were elements that have slowly been phased out of action games over the last console generation, and other players may not have the patience for these. Brian Ashcraft of Kotaku also noted that the demo's pace was often set by how fast Trico would respond or react, which may test the patience of players looking for a more action-based experience.

=== Sales ===
In the UK, The Last Guardian suffered lower than expected sales, debuting at number 7 in the weekly game sales charts. It debuted at number four in the Japanese video game sales charts, with 82,260 copies sold. The following week, it sold an additional 10,754 copies in Japan, bringing the total number of copies sold in the country to 93,014.

=== Awards ===
Year	Award	Category	Result	Ref
2016	20th Annual D.I.C.E. Awards	Adventure Game of the Year	Nominated	
2016	20th Annual D.I.C.E. Awards	Outstanding Achievement in Game Direction	Nominated	
2016	20th Annual D.I.C.E. Awards	Outstanding Achievement in Animation	Nominated	
2016	20th Annual D.I.C.E. Awards	Outstanding Achievement in Art Direction	Nominated	
2016	20th Annual D.I.C.E. Awards	Outstanding Achievement in Character (Trico)	Won	
2016	20th Annual D.I.C.E. Awards	Outstanding Achievement in Original Music Composition	Nominated	
2016	20th Annual D.I.C.E. Awards	Outstanding Achievement in Sound Design	Nominated	
2016	17th Game Developers Choice Awards	Best Narrative	Nominated	
2016	17th Game Developers Choice Awards	Best Visual Art	Nominated	
2016	SXSW Gaming Awards	Excellence in Musical Score	Nominated	
2016	SXSW Gaming Awards	Excellence in Animation	Nominated	
2016	SXSW Gaming Awards	Most Memorable Character (Trico)	Nominated	
2016	SXSW Gaming Awards	Excellence in Narrative	Nominated	
2016	13th British Academy Games Awards	Artistic Achievement	Nominated	
2016	13th British Academy Games Awards	Audio Achievement	Won	
2016	13th British Academy Games Awards	Music	Nominated	
2016	13th British Academy Games Awards	Original Property	Nominated	
