= Air Ranger: Rescue Helicopter =

2001 video game

- Developer: ASK
- Publishers: JP: ASK; EU: Midas Interactive Entertainment
- Platform: PlayStation 2
- Release: JP: March 29, 2001; EU: November 22, 2002
- Genre: Flight simulator
- Mode: Single-player

Air Ranger: Rescue Helicopter is a helicopter simulator video game released for the PlayStation 2, developed and published by ASK Corporation. The game was released on March 29, 2001 in Japan, and November 15, 2002 for Europe by budget publisher Midas Interactive Entertainment. The game was never released in North America. In the game, the player must take the role of a Rescue Helicopter pilot and complete missions involving accidents such as car crashes or fires.

== Reception ==
On release, Famitsu magazine scored the game a 30 out of 40. The reviewer for GameSpot was not impressed, calling the game an "unassuming" simulator with "dull" graphics. Likewise, the reviewer for PSM2 called it "Feeble, do-good helicopter sim that's so horribly dumbed down it halves your IQ every time play it.", awarding it a score of 26%.

== Air Ranger 2 Plus Rescue Helicopter ==
A sequel to Air Ranger has been released for PlayStation 2. Air Ranger 2 allows the player to pilot rescue and law enforcement helicopters. All the helicopters from the previous game are available with a few extra helicopters such as the Eurocopter AS365 Dauphin and Sikorsky H-53.

== See also ==
- City Crisis
- SimCopter
