= Golden Sun: Dark Dawn =

2010 video game

- North American box art
- Developer: Camelot Software Planning
- Publisher: Nintendo
- Director: Shugo Takahashi
- Producers: Hiroyuki Takahashi; Shugo Takahashi; Toshiharu Izuno
- Designers: Hiroyuki Takahashi; Shugo Takahashi
- Artist: Shin Yamanouchi
- Writer: Hiroyuki Takahashi
- Composer: Motoi Sakuraba
- Series: Golden Sun
- Platform: Nintendo DS
- Release: JP: October 28, 2010; NA: November 29, 2010; AU: December 2, 2010; EU: December 10, 2010
- Genre: Role-playing
- Mode: Single-player

Golden Sun: Dark Dawn (Note: Japanese: 黄金の太陽 漆黒なる夜明け, Hepburn: Ōgon no Taiyō: Shikkoku Naru Yoake) is a 2010 role-playing video game developed by Camelot Software Planning and published by Nintendo for the Nintendo DS. The third entry in the Golden Sun series, it is set thirty years after the events of the first two games and follows the descendants of the earlier games' heroes. Players control characters as they travel through the fictional world of Weyard. The game utilizes gameplay elements pioneered by its predecessors, primarily the use of magic called "Psynergy" to defeat enemies and discover new locations, help local populations, and find elemental djinn which can augment the player's powers.

Dark Dawn was generally well received by critics, receiving a 79% rating on the review aggregation website Metacritic, although its score was lower than both of its predecessors. The game was praised for successfully transitioning the 2D-style graphics of its predecessors into 3D and for being relatively easy for newcomers to the franchise to play. However, critics noted that the game shared shortcomings present in previous games, such as excessive in-game dialogue, and that the features of the Golden Sun series that were refreshing when the original games were released now felt dated.

== Gameplay ==
Golden Sun's form of magic, called "Psynergy", can be used in battle and in dungeons. Here, the "Douse" spell is used to douse a torch blocking the player's path.

Dark Dawn, like its predecessors, uses the traditional role-playing video game formula. Players control characters through a fantasy-themed world as they interact with other characters, battle monsters, acquire Psynergy and equipment, and take part in a predefined narrative. Unlike the previous games, some locations become inaccessible after certain points, although new locations become accessible after players acquire a ship. A new feature is the addition of an encyclopedia system, which explains and keeps track of new and returning gameplay elements to players.

Most gameplay outside of battle takes place either in the game's overworld or within dungeons, caves, and other locales with puzzles integrated into their layout. To complete puzzles, players utilize the environment around them to complete objectives. Many puzzles revolve around the game's resident form of magic spells, Psynergy, requiring the player to use different Psynergy spells to overcome obstacles. The player gains more Psynergy spells as the game progresses, either through leveling up or acquiring special items. With each new Psynergy spell, the party gains access to more locations and secrets hidden within the game world. The Nintendo DS hardware allows players to use Psynergy to manipulate their surroundings in ways not possible in previous installments.

Dark Dawn contains both random monster encounters and compulsory battles that advance the story. Battles take place on the lower screen, where the enemy party and the player's party are displayed on opposing sides. In battle, the player must defeat enemies via direct attacks with weapons, offensive Psynergy spells, and other means of causing damage while keeping the party alive through items and supportive Psynergy that heal and raise defensive stats. Unlike the first two games, Dark Dawn features a smarter intelligent targeting system that allows one of two party members who initially target the same enemy to intelligently target a random undefeated enemy once the initial enemy is defeated by another member.

The game also features the Djinn system from previous games, where the player collects and manipulates elemental creatures called Djinn, which can be found throughout the game world. Dark Dawn introduces several new Djinn. Djinn form the basis of the game's stat enhancement system, and Djinn that are "set" to a certain character dictate that character's Psynergy capabilities. Allocating Djinn among different characters modifies the characters' classes, altering hit points, Psynergy points, general stats and changing their available Psynergy. There are 72 obtainable Djinn in the game, which allow for several possible class setups and combat options.

== Synopsis ==
=== Setting ===
Like previous games, Dark Dawn is set in the land of Weyard, where alchemy is a source of power. Through the efforts of the protagonists in the previous games, the seal that contained the power of alchemy at Mount Aleph was broken at the end of The Lost Age. The power of alchemy, in the form of the Golden Sun, began to restore the declining world. Dark Dawn begins thirty years after the conclusion of The Lost Age, during which time continents shifted, new countries emerged, and new species appeared in Weyard. However, "Psynergy Vortexes", which suck the elemental Psynergy from the land and the power-wielding "adepts", began appearing all over the world. Dark Dawn follows the descendants of the previous games' protagonists as they attempt to resolve the problems caused by the Psynergy Vortexes.

=== Characters ===
Like previous games in the series, the player initially controls a small number of characters, with the number of playable characters increasing over the course of the game to eight characters. When the game begins, the player controls Matthew, Karis, and Tyrell. Throughout the game, other characters join the party, including Rief, Amiti, Sveta, Eoleo, and Himi.

=== Plot ===
Matthew's team acquires a ship during the second half of the game, allowing them to visit many previously inaccessible areas.

The primary group consists of the children of the heroes from the original Golden Sun games, all of whom are adepts. The leader is Matthew, a silent and strong-willed Adept who is the son of Isaac and Jenna. His initial companions consist of his childhood friends Tyrell, Garet's son, and Karis, Ivan's daughter. When Tyrell accidentally breaks a flying machine critical to Isaac's work, Isaac sends them to find a rare Mountain Roc feather required to fix it. They are instructed to head to the nearby Konpa Ruins to meet Isaac's mentor Kraden and Mia's children Rief and Nowell. However, they are ambushed by three mysterious Adepts; Blados, Chalis, and Arcanus. The group is separated, with Matthew, Tyrell, Karis, and Rief trapped on the southern half of the continent, while Kraden and Nowell are stuck in the north. Seeking to reunite with the latter two, Matthew and his party enlist the help of the enigmatic Prince Amiti to cross into the Morgal region, home of the beastmen.

In Morgal, the group meets Felix's one-time enemy, the pirate captain Briggs, who asks them for help rescuing his son Eoleo, who is being held captive in the Morgal capital of Belinsk. The group is also guided to the Mountain Roc by a part-beast woman named Sveta and successfully steal a feather from it. In Belinsk, Matthew regroups with Kraden, who reveals that Nowell has remained in the company of his old friend Piers. They attempt to sneak into Morgal's castle through an underground labyrinth with Sveta's aid, but Blados, Chalis, and Arcanus reappear. The group activates the Alchemy Dynamo hidden in the ruins, triggering the Grave Eclipse and causing death and suffering across much of the continent. Morgal's king Volechek, who is revealed to be Sveta's older brother, and Briggs sacrifice themselves to allow Matthew and his group to escape; in response, Eoleo swears revenge for his father's death and joins Matthew's party.

While sailing the oceans of Weyard, Matthew's party learns that the only way to stop the Grave Eclipse is by using the Apollo Lens, an alchemy machine powered by the Alchemy Forge and the Alchemy Well. To reach the Apollo Lens, they must find the legendary Umbra Gear. With help from a priestess named Himi, they are able to find the Umbra Gear and reach the Lens. The group confronts and slays Blados, Chalis, and their beast companion, the Chaos Hound. Matthew and Sveta both attempt to activate the Apollo Lens, but fail. The Chaos Hound, which is revealed to be a brainwashed and mutated Volechek, sacrifices himself to activate the Apollo Lens, and the Grave Eclipse ends, while Arcanus, who is revealed to be Isaac's old enemy Alex, escapes. At the end of the game, Matthew, Karis, and Tyrell part ways with their friends and return home to find Isaac and Garet missing and an unusually large Psynergy Vortex greeting them.

== Development ==
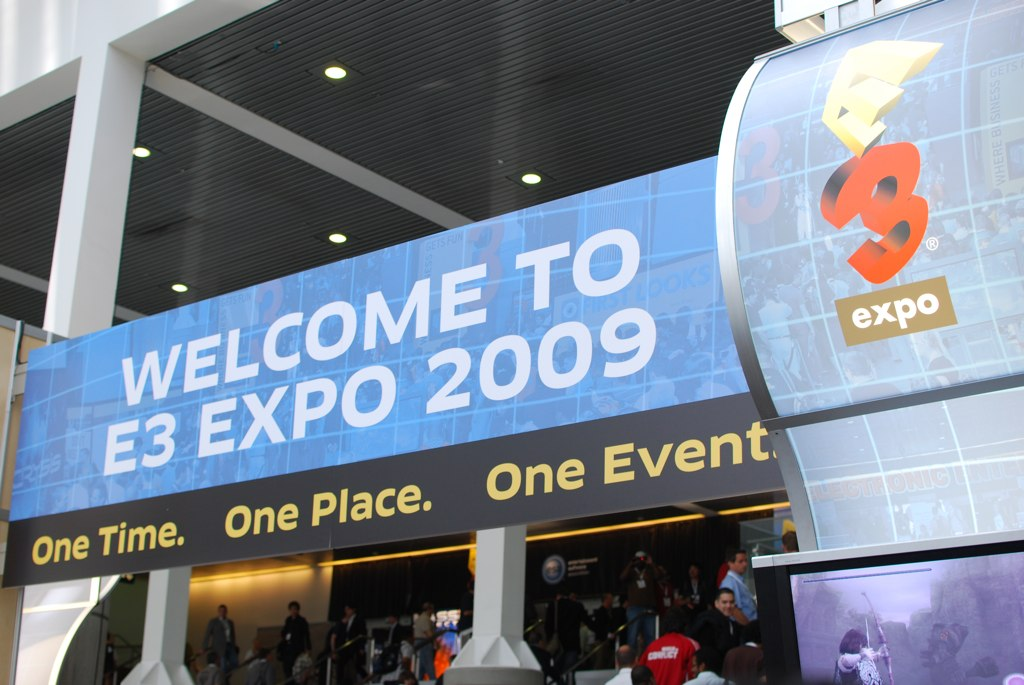
After years of speculation, development for Dark Dawn was officially announced at E3 2009.

Talk of a third entry in the Golden Sun series began as soon as The Lost Age was released in 2002. A year later, Camelot stated that "the current status of a third game ... is still up in the air", while the studio's founding brothers Hiroyuki and Shugo Takahashi stated in a 2004 interview that the scenarios of the first two games were intended as "prologues to the real event yet to come", with rumors at the time suggesting a third title might surface on the GameCube.

Speculation persisted, and series creators the Takahashi brothers commented in October 2007 that they still wanted to make a third game, going so far as to say that they "have to" and that Nintendo had asked them to make another. They claimed that they wished to give the title the development time it deserved. In April 2008, Nintendo Power magazine interviewed Shugo Takahashi on one of his latest games. When questioned regarding a third Golden Sun, he enigmatically replied, "a new Golden Sun? Well, I personally think that I want to play a new RPG, too."

Hoaxes began spreading in the absence of definitive reports about a new installment in the franchise. Notably, a fake Nintendo DS game called Golden Sun: The Solar Soothsayer was shown off at a small pre-E3 2007 gathering. After officials announced it as a hoax, the hoax's creator confessed he made it in order to generate more discussion about the series and a sequel. Learning about the hoax after the release of Dark Dawn, Hiroyuki Takahashi commented that The Solar Soothsayer's premise "sounds really cool ... I want to see how it would turn out!"

In 2009, Nintendo announced the development of a then-untitled third installment of the series for the Nintendo DS at the Electronic Entertainment Expo (E3), with a release date set for the 2010 holiday season. The next year at E3 2010, the title's name was announced as Golden Sun: Dark Dawn and a playable demo was made available to attendees.

In an interview with Weekly Famitsu in July 2010, Shugo Takahashi stated that unlike its predecessors, the game was independent work. Hiroyuki Takahashi commented on the unnaturally long development cycle of Golden Sun games, due to their large background and storyline. He said that he was burned out after the release of The Lost Age and that his team "needed to cool down before we could really begin on Dark Dawn...and develop with fresh feelings." When development finally commenced, Camelot gave them a larger team than the ones that worked on the previous games, which allowed for luxuries such as visiting various UNESCO World Heritage Sites to help influence and develop the story.

== Reception ==
Reception

Aggregate scores
Aggregator	Score
GameRankings	80.72% (40 Reviews)
Metacritic	79% (63 Reviews)

Review scores
Publication	Score
1Up.com	B
Edge	8/10
Eurogamer	8/10
Famitsu	33/40
GameSpot	7.5/10
IGN	7.5/10

Golden Sun: Dark Dawn received mostly positive reviews from critics. It achieved 79% on Metacritic and 80% on GameRankings. The game was not as well received as its predecessors: Golden Sun received a 91% and a 90% on Metacritic and GameRankings, and The Lost Age received an 86% and an 87%. Edge said that "despite its lack of teeth... Golden Sun remains a franchise with plenty to say," although IGN felt that the game "ultimately feels somewhat dated".

Dark Dawn's graphics, Djinn system and puzzles were generally well received. While 1UP.com felt that the battle graphics were "vivid ... [and] never [grew] tedious or overblown", GameSpot said the game's "visuals have brought the 2D world of the GBA games into full 3D on the DS to good effect. The world, the characters, and especially the attacks in combat look great". Wired agreed, commenting that the game "does a fine job of highlighting the graphical capabilities of the hardware". GamesRadar said the game's Djinn system made the game interesting enough so that "veteran RPG players [wouldn't] be bored with the gameplay". Game Revolution praised the game's puzzle setting like its predecessor that "are rarely very difficult, but the sense of satisfaction you get after grabbing your elusive reward is still like crack for the exploratory player". Besides, the game's encyclopedia system would allow new players to get familiar with the previous games, gaming blog Kotaku said it is "extremely newbie friendly".

Critics found battle too easy and cut-scenes dialogue too long. While GameRevolution said battle can "[use] the Djinn and subsequently summoning monsters ... pound on your enemies with attacks instead", GamesRadar complains that: "Not only are the actual battles themselves easy, but your Psynergy recharges so quickly that you can use it liberally in healing and battles without ever having to use a single recovery item – you never feel stretched for resources or find yourself in a tight spot". Edge agreed, praising the intelligent combat system but chastising Camelot for failing to create suitably difficult combat scenarios: "bar a few bosses, 'Dark Dawn' is a pushover, never requiring you to brave the combat's depths". 1UP.com said the game's long dialogue scenes are just like its predecessors in that "heroes and villains have an uncanny knack for saying incredibly simple things with about three or four times the words they actually need to convey those ideas". This entry adds an emotion system, so the silent character can respond other roles, however, reviews think it is unnecessary and does not really affect plot.

Dark Dawn sold 46,000 units in its first four days in Japan, and ranked fifth of the period. In the UK, the game was 23rd best-selling Nintendo DS game in its first released weekend. The game has sold 80,000 copies in Japan as of January 2012.
