= E3 2009 =

15th annual Electronic Entertainment Expo

Electronic Entertainment Expo 2009
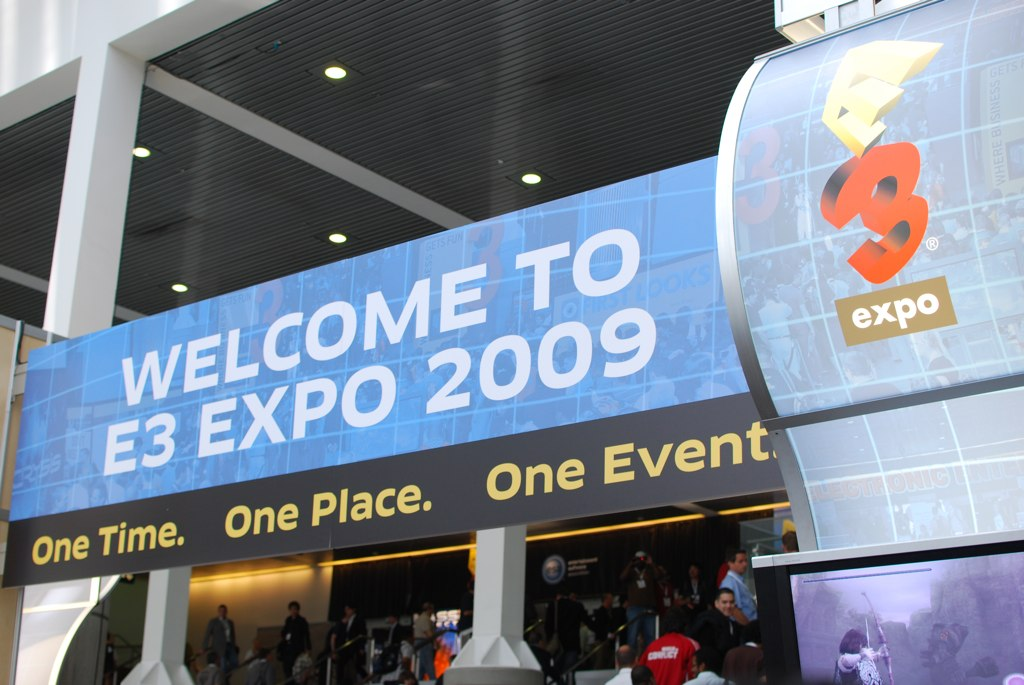
- Genre: Multi-genre
- Begins: June 2, 2009
- Ends: June 4, 2009
- Venue: Los Angeles Convention Center
- Locations: Los Angeles, California
- Country: United States
- Previous event: E3 2008
- Next event: E3 2010
- Attendance: 41,000
- Organizer: Entertainment Software Association
- Filing status: Non-profit

The Electronic Entertainment Expo 2009 (E3 2009) was the 15th E3 held. The event took place at the Los Angeles Convention Center in Los Angeles, California. It began on June 2, 2009, and ended on June 4, 2009, with 41,000 total attendees.

Major hardware announcements during the show included Microsoft's Project Natal and both Sony's PSP Go and PlayStation Move, while major software announcements included Left 4 Dead 2, Metal Gear Solid: Rising, Halo: Reach, Final Fantasy XIV, New Super Mario Bros. Wii, Super Mario Galaxy 2, and Monado: Beginning of the World.

== History ==
The E3 2009 was greatly expanded in terms of size from the previous two years as it was reopened to all qualified computer and gaming audiences. In 2007, the E3 was restructured, downsized and renamed to the E3 Media and Business Summit. The move was widely criticized by those both within and outside the gaming industry. The following 2007 and 2008 E3 summits attracted very few attendees in contrast to previous years; E3 2007 attracted only 10,000 attendees and E3 2008 attracted 50% less, 5,000 attendees.

The E3 2009 aimed to return E3 to its 'pre-E3 2007' state, by reopening it to a larger audience allowing more attendees. As well as having a larger venue and allowing more exhibitors, E3 2009 also reverted its name to Electronic Entertainment Expo. However, like pre-2007, the event was still not open to the general public.

== Floor layout ==
E3 2009 was held at the Los Angeles Convention Center with the show occupying the South and West Halls as well as the first floor.

=== West hall ===
The west hall housed both Sony Computer Entertainment and Nintendo as well as third-party publishers Activision, Bethesda, Capcom, THQ and Atlus. It also housed GameSpot's media booth.

=== South hall ===
The south hall housed a larger number of publisher booths, including Microsoft, Square Enix, Koei, Ubisoft, Namco Bandai, Warner Bros., Disney, Eidos, MTV Games, EA, Sega and Konami. This was also where the majority of G4's media coverage took place, and in the media and bloggers lounge.

=== First floor ===
The first floor housed sub booths of publishers on the ground floor, such as Square Enix, Sega, Capcom and Activision. It also housed the main booths of other publishers, such as LucasArts and Majesco.

== List of featured games ==
Xbox 360: Alan Wake; Crackdown 2; Banjo-Kazooie: Nuts & Bolts; Forza Motorsport 3; Halo: Reach; Call of Duty: Modern Warfare 2 (also for PS3, PC); Halo 3: ODST; SpongeBob's Truth or Square (video game) (also for Wii, PSP, DS); Left 4 Dead 2 (also for PC); Perfect Dark (Xbox Live Arcade); Shadow Complex (Xbox LIVE Arcade); Project Natal; Facebook on Xbox LIVE; Twitter on Xbox LIVE; Last.fm on Xbox LIVE	Wii: Metroid: Other M; Monado: Beginning of the World; New Super Mario Bros. Wii; Super Mario Galaxy 2; Tornado Outbreak (also for 360, PS3); Wii Fit Plus; Wii Sports Resort; Wii Vitality Sensor; Nintendo DS: Golden Sun DS; The Legend of Zelda: Spirit Tracks; Mario & Luigi: Bowser's Inside Story; Scribblenauts; Kingdom Hearts 358/2 Days; PC: Mafia II; APB; Star Wars: The Old Republic	PlayStation 3: Agent; Final Fantasy XIV (also for PC); Katamari Forever; The Last Guardian; ModNation Racers; MAG; Heavy Rain; Assassin's Creed 2 (also for 360, PC); Ratchet & Clank Future: A Crack in Time; White Knight Chronicles; Gran Turismo 5; God of War III; Uncharted 2: Among Thieves; PlayStation Move; 50 New PSone Classics; PlayStation Portable: PlayStation Portable Go; Gran Turismo Mobile; Metal Gear Solid: Peace Walker; Resident Evil Portable; Jak and Daxter: The Lost Frontier	Capcom: Tatsunoko vs. Capcom: Ultimate All-Stars (Wii); Electronic Arts: Crysis 2 (PC, PS3, X360); Konami: Metal Gear Solid: Rising (PC, PS3, X360); Castlevania: Lords of Shadow (PS3, X360); MTV Games: The Beatles: Rock Band (PS3, Wii, X360); Square Enix: Front Mission Evolved (PC, PS3, X360); Nier (PS3, X360); Supreme Commander 2 (PC, X360); THQ: WWE Smackdown vs. Raw 2010 (PC, PS3, X360, DS, PS2, Wii, PSP, Mobile Phone)

== Notable exhibitors list ==
- 2K Games
- Activision
- Atlus
- Bungie
- Bethesda
- Blizzard
- Capcom
- Codemasters
- Disney
- Eidos
- EA
- Ignition
- Koei
- Konami
- LucasArts
- Microsoft
- MTV Games
- Namco Bandai
- Nintendo
- Paradox
- Rockstar
- Sega
- SNK Playmore
- Sony
- Square Enix
- Tecmo
- THQ
- Ubisoft
- Warner Bros.
- Valve

Atari was originally due to exhibit at E3 2009 but pulled out at the last minute. The reasons for this sudden withdrawal are still currently unclear.

== Notable press conferences ==
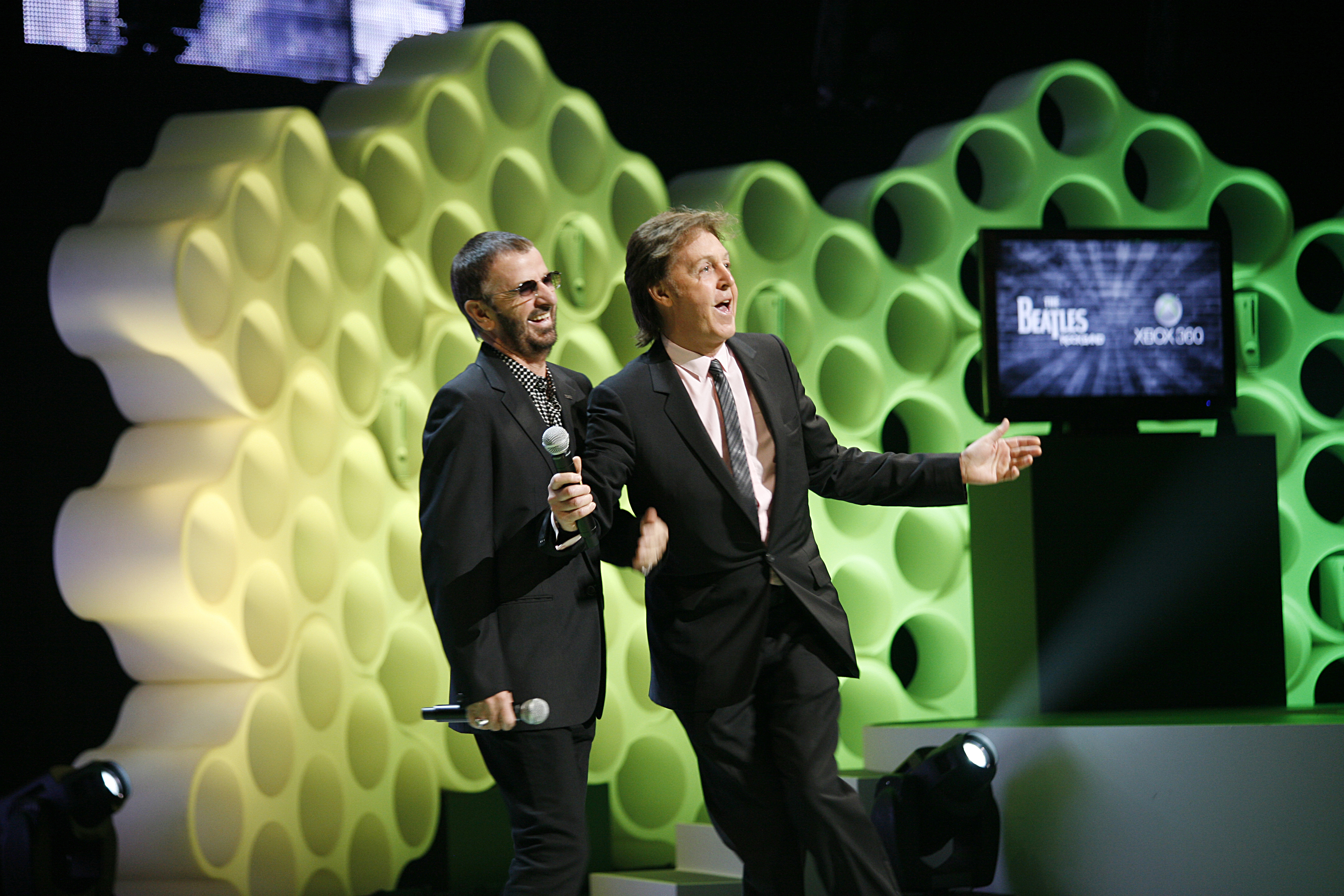
Paul McCartney and Ringo Starr appearing at the Xbox E3 2009 media briefing to promote The Beatles: Rock Band.

- Microsoft

Date: June 1, 2009
Host(s): John Schappert
Notable Speakers: Hideo Kojima, Paul McCartney, Ringo Starr, Tony Hawk, Yoshinori Kitase, Cliff Bleszinski, Steven Spielberg
Hardware Announcements: Project Natal
Microsoft reveals Project Natal, a detection, recognition and motion sensing device for the Xbox 360. Kojima revealed Metal Gear Solid: Rising as the first Metal Gear Solid game on Xbox 360, although the game will also be available for PlayStation 3 and PC. The Beatles: Rock Band was featured. Crysis 2 was announced. Trailers for Crackdown 2, Tom Clancy's Splinter Cell: Conviction, Dante's Inferno, Mass Effect 2, Left 4 Dead 2, and The Saboteur were shown. Halo: Reach was announced by Bungie. Turn 10 Studios announced Forza Motorsport 3, to be released October 2009. Facebook and Twitter revealed to get their own programs on the 360. Gameplay for Modern Warfare 2, Assassin's Creed II, Tom Clancy's Splinter Cell: Conviction, Alan Wake, Halo 3: ODST, Forza Motorsport 3, and Final Fantasy XIII was shown. Also, a new upcoming game for Xbox Live Arcade is Shadow Complex, showed by Epic Games and Chair Entertainment.

- Nintendo

Date: June 2, 2009
Host(s): Reggie Fils-Aimé, Cammie Dunaway
Notable Speakers: Satoru Iwata
Hardware Announcements: Wii Vitality Sensor
Nintendo unveiled New Super Mario Bros. Wii which supports up to 4 player co-op. Golden Sun DS was announced. WarioWare D.I.Y. was announced for DS. Super Mario Galaxy 2 was announced for Wii, making the Wii the first console since the Super Nintendo Entertainment System to have two core Mario platformers. Wii Fit Plus was announced. More gameplay for Wii Sports Resort was shown. Mario & Luigi: Bowser's Inside Story was also announced for Fall 2009 . Kingdom Hearts 358/2 Days were featured. Third party games Resident Evil: The Darkside Chronicles, Dead Space: Extraction, and The Conduit were highlighted. In a private roundtable meeting, Miyamoto showed concept art for The Legend of Zelda: Skyward Sword and hopes to release it by 2010.

- Sony

Date: June 2, 2009
Host(s): Jack Tretton
Notable Speakers: Hideo Kojima, Kazuo Hirai
Hardware Announcements: PlayStation Move, PSP Go
Sony revealed the PlayStation Move prototype which uses the PlayStation Eye for 1:1 tracking. A new trailer for Final Fantasy XIII was shown. Square Enix announced Final Fantasy XIV, due to be released in 2010. Metal Gear Solid: Peace Walker was announced. The PSP Go was featured. New gameplay demos of Uncharted 2: Among Thieves and God of War III were debuted. Other games shown were Assassin's Creed II, ModNation Racers, Team Ico's The Last Guardian and Gran Turismo 5.

== Media coverage ==
G4 was the official broadcaster of E3 2009. G4 offered 22 hours of live event coverage, coverage of all 5 major press conferences and exclusive interviews with gaming executives. G4's coverage began on-air and online (at G4TV.com) on Monday, June 1 and continued through Thursday, June 4. G4 also covered many exclusive game demos at E3 2009 as well as Steve Wiebe's unsuccessful world record Donkey Kong high score attempt.

== Attendance ==
At E3 2009 there was a total 41,000 attendees, which is only a 41% reduction of the 70,000 attendee high from 2005 and an 820% increase on the previous year's (2008's) E3. These attendees came from 78 countries and viewed products from 216 different exhibitors.

== Awards ==
A majority of the industry leading media outlets award Game of the Show. Additional awards pertaining to more specific categories based on platform and genre are also given.

=== E3 2009 Best of Show Winners ===
- 1UP.com - Uncharted 2: Among Thieves
- Game Critics Awards - Uncharted 2: Among Thieves
- GameSpot - Scribblenauts
- GameSpy - Scribblenauts
- GameTrailers - God of War III
- X-Play - Uncharted 2: Among Thieves

=== IGN ===
Best Action Game	Best Fighting Game
Alan Wake; Brütal Legend; God of War III; Splinter Cell Conviction; Uncharted 2: Among Thieves	Tatsunoko vs. Capcom: Ultimate All-Stars; Dissidia: Final Fantasy; King of Fighters XII; Marvel Vs. Capcom 2; Tekken 6
Best Music/Rhythm Game	Best Platforming Game
DJ Hero; Beatles Rock Band; Def Jam Rapstar; Karaoke Revolution	LittleBigPlanet (PSP); Drawn to Life: The Next Chapter; Jak & Daxter: The Lost Frontier; New Super Mario Bros. Wii; 'Splosion Man
Best Racing Game	Best Role Playing Game
Forza Motorsport 3; Gran Turismo (PSP); Dirt 2; ModNation Racers; Need for Speed: Shift	Mass Effect 2; Alpha Protocol; Dragon Age: Origins; Final Fantasy XIII; White Knight Chronicles
Best Shooting Game	Best Sports Game
Call of Duty: Modern Warfare 2; Halo: ODST; Left 4 Dead 2; Lost Planet 2; Red Steel 2	Fight Night Round 4; FIFA 10; Madden NFL 10; Tiger Woods 10; Wii Sports Resort
Best Strategy Game	Best Graphics Technology
Supreme Commander 2; East India Company; Hearts of Iron 3; Order of War; R.U.S.E.	Uncharted 2: Among Thieves; Assassin's Creed 2; Alan Wake; God of War III; Mass Effect 2
Best Artistic Design	Best Non-playable Presentation
The Last Guardian; Assassin's Creed 2; Brütal Legend; Muramasa: The Demon Blade; The Saboteur	The Last Guardian; Crackdown 2; Gran Turismo 5; Super Mario Galaxy 2
Best PC Game	Overall Game of Show
Star Wars: The Old Republic; Dragon Age: Origins; Left 4 Dead 2; Mass Effect 2; Supreme Commander 2	Scribblenauts; Alan Wake; Mass Effect 2; Call of Duty: Modern Warfare 2; Uncharted 2: Among Thieves
