= Charles Martinet =

American actor (born 1955)

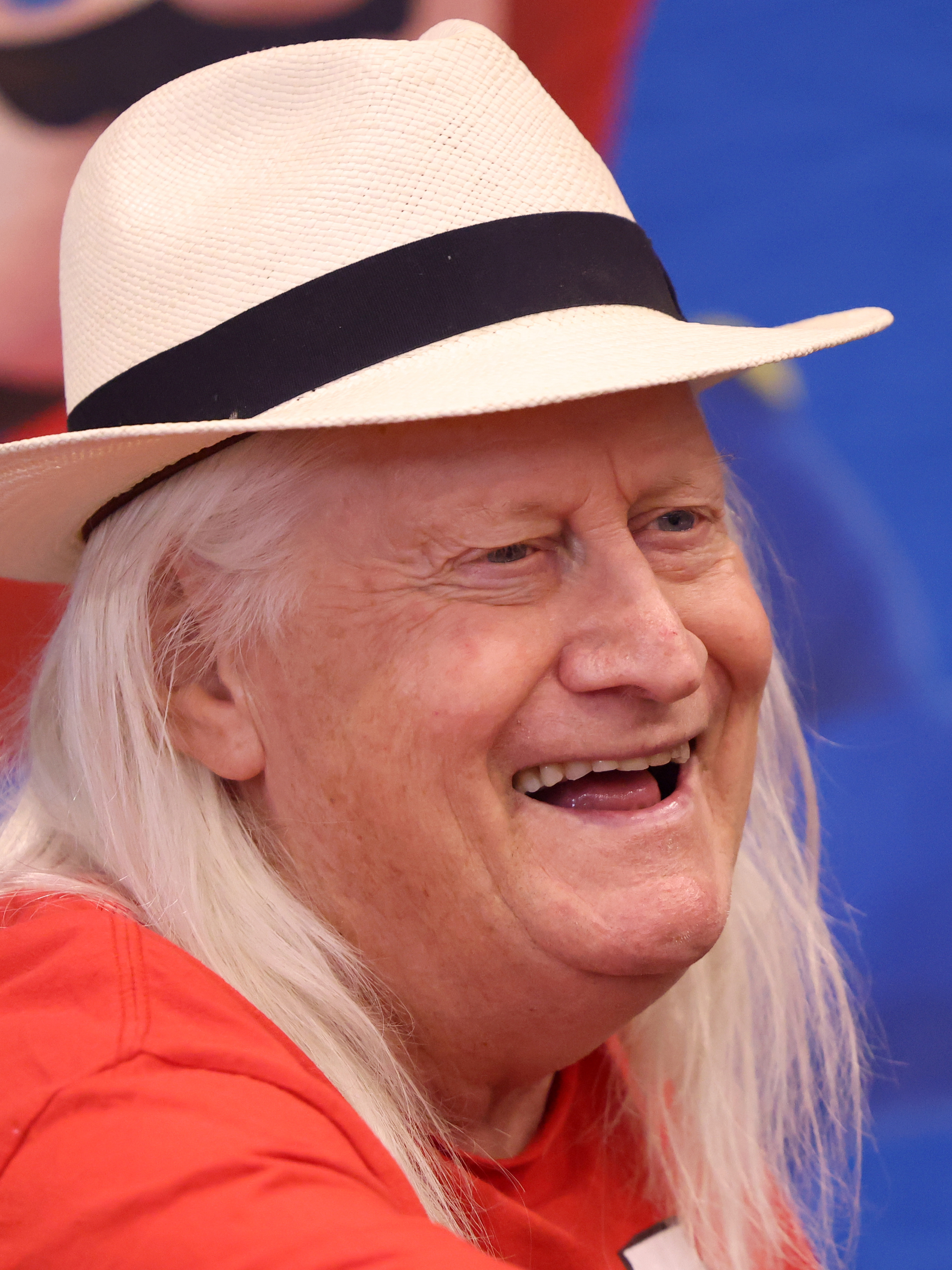
- Martinet in 2026
- Born: Charles Andre Martinet; September 17, 1955 (age 71); San Jose, California, U.S.
- Education: University of California, Berkeley; Drama Studio London
- Occupations: Actor; voice actor
- Years active: 1986–present
- Notable work: Voice of Mario, Luigi, Wario, Waluigi, Baby Mario and Baby Luigi in the Mario franchise
- Title: Mario Ambassador
- Awards: Guinness World Records (2018); Most video game voiceover performances as the same character (Mario)
- Website: charlesmartinet.com

Charles Andre Martinet (Note: English: /ˈmɑːrtɪneɪ/ MART-in-ay, French: [maʁtinɛ]; sometimes spelled "Martinee" or "Martinez" in acting credits.) (born September 17, 1955) is an American actor. From 1991 to 2023, Martinet was the voice of Mario in the Mario franchise. He also voiced other characters in the series such as Luigi, Wario, Waluigi, and the baby equivalents of Mario and Luigi, prior to retiring as voice actor to become an official brand ambassador for the series.

Martinet is also known for his portrayal of Paarthurnax in 2011's The Elder Scrolls V: Skyrim, as well as Magenta in 2022's Dragon Ball Super: Super Hero.

== Early life ==
Charles Andre Martinet was born on September 17, 1955, in San Jose or Cupertino, California to father Jacques René Pierre Martinet. The younger of two children, he has an older brother, John, though he was taller than him despite being the younger sibling, and while his brother was extroverted, Martinet was shy and more anxiety-driven than him in his youth. His mother's family had been in the country since the Mayflower voyages, while his father grew up in Paris, France, and Martinet's paternal grandfather served in World War I under General Pershing in order to get eligibility for American citizenship; they then came to the US when Martinet was a child. This makes him French-American.

His family moved to Barcelona, Spain when he was 12 years old, where he attended an American middle school. In 1969, after three years in Spain, they moved to Paris. He attended the American School of Paris and graduated in 1974.

As a young adult, Martinet became interested in international law. He attended the University of California, Berkeley, where he majored in history or politics. In his senior year, he decided to discontinue his studies after a tutor told him to "regurgitate information he'd written in his book, chapter-by-chapter". When he was about 20 years old, a friend persuaded him to take acting classes to combat his fear of public speaking. His first role was a monologue from the Spoon River Anthology. During his acting classes, Martinet met a classmate with a stutter. The classmate explained that his stutter had suddenly manifested the day after a stand-up comedian singled him out for public humiliation at a comedy club on his birthday. Deeply impacted by the story, Martinet committed to a personal rule that his own comedic work would never be mean-spirited or cause harm to an audience.

Martinet auditioned for and won an apprenticeship at the Berkeley Repertory Theatre. After training with the Berkeley Rep for several years, Martinet went to London to attend the Drama Studio London, where among other skills, he discovered his talent for accents and dialects. Upon returning to California he joined the Berkeley Repertory Theatre. He went on to become a founding member of the San Jose Repertory Theatre for four years.

== Career ==
=== Voice acting in the Mario franchise ===
Martinet earned the job as Mario's voice at Nintendo when, in 1991, he was on the beach and received a call from a friend who told him that there was going to be an audition at a trade show in which auditioners "talk to people as a plumber". He went to the audition at the last minute as the casting directors were already putting away their equipment. Martinet walked in and asked, "Can I please read for this?" The directors let him and gave the description of "an Italian plumber from Brooklyn". At first Martinet planned to talk like a stereotypical Italian American with a deep, raspy voice. He then thought to himself that it would be too harsh for children to hear, so he made it more soft-hearted and friendly, resulting in what Mario's voice is today. Martinet has also stated that he kept on talking with his Mario voice until the audition tape ran out. (Note: Attributed to multiple references:) He says that Gremio from William Shakespeare's The Taming of the Shrew was an inspiration for his portrayal of Mario.

Working for Nintendo since 1991, Martinet started voicing Mario at video game trade shows in which attendees would walk up to a television screen displaying a 3D Mario head, which was designed to move around the screen and hold full conversations with them. This system was called Mario in Real-Time or MIRT and was developed by Pasadena based SimGraphics. (Note: Attributed to multiple references:) Martinet could see the attendees by means of a hidden camera setup, and a facial motion capture rig recorded his mouth movements to synchronize Martinet's mouth movement with the on-screen Mario mouth movement. This digital puppetry, with Martinet's comic performance, was a novelty at the time.

Martinet's first video game appearance as Mario was in the 1994 CD version of Mario Teaches Typing and formally debuted in the 1995 release of Mario's Game Gallery, where he spoke full dialogue as Mario for extended periods of time to the player.

Most were first exposed to Mario's voice in the landmark 1996 game Super Mario 64. During his time working through MIRT, Martinet became acquainted with Mario series creator Shigeru Miyamoto. Seeking a professional voice actor for Super Mario 64, Miyamoto had Nintendo contact Martinet to inquire about voicing Mario in the game. An opportunity he was not expecting, Martinet agreed immediately, making the trip from Sausalito to Bad Animals Studio in Seattle to record for the game. Mostly unscripted, Martinet was given examples of what the teams in Japan were looking for by the producers, in addition to improvisation which lead to the creation of many of Mario's catchphrases. During the recording session, it was wondered what Mario would do when the player leaves him alone. In the end, Martinet came up with the idea that Mario would dream of pasta during his sleep. In the final game, Mario says "night nighty. Ahhh spaghetti, ahhh ravioli, ahhh mamma mia" when in his second sleeping position.

Following Super Mario 64, he would go on to additionally voice Luigi, Wario, Waluigi, Metal Mario, Shadow Mario, Mini-Mario Toys, Baby Mario and Baby Luigi in most games wherein these characters speak. He also voiced the enemies Wart, Mouser, Tryclyde, and Clawgrip in Super Mario Advance. His voice work appears in the English and Japanese language versions of the games. With his work as Mario in Super Smash Bros. Ultimate, the Guinness Book of World Records recognized Martinet for having performed the same character in one hundred different titles, the most of any video game voice actor. Martinet also did Mario's voice as a guest character in SSX on Tour, along with Luigi, and as the announcer for Pac-Man Vs. both on the Nintendo GameCube.

In February 2021, Martinet said the possibility of reprising his role in the animated The Super Mario Bros. Movie would be a "marvelous thing" and that if he were asked to voice Mario he would "go in and play with great joy and happiness". Despite this, Chris Pratt was cast as Mario instead, though Martinet appeared briefly for cameo voices of Mario's father and a Brooklyn citizen named Giuseppe.

=== Other voice acting roles ===
Martinet at SacAnime 2014

Martinet, alongside Mike Shapiro, provided voice acting for the boxers, referee and announcer in the Super NES title Super Punch-Out!!. He voiced the character Vigoro in Sega's Dreamcast and GameCube role-playing video game, Skies of Arcadia. He did the voice of Homunculus in the Konami PlayStation 2, Xbox and Windows game Shadow of Destiny, and provided voices for Reader Rabbit and The ClueFinders games. In 2009, Martinet told That Gaming Site that he wanted to voice Link in The Legend of Zelda: Ocarina of Time, but Shigeru Miyamoto told him that Link would remain without a voice. However, Link's grunts have been voiced by various Japanese voice actors.

In addition to video game voiceovers, Martinet has worked as a voice actor in commercials, cartoons, and promotions. At the Electronic Entertainment Expo (E3) trade show in 2005, Martinet remotely interacted with players from New York in a playable demo of Animal Crossing: Wild World. Martinet also narrated for a Hidden Valley Ranch commercial for Sega's Sonic the Hedgehog franchise in 1994.

Other than the Mario series, Martinet has also done work for the video game Cel Damage as the voice of Fowl Mouth, as well as the primary voice work in several educational games for LeapFrog devices. He also voiced the dragon Paarthurnax in the 2011 video game The Elder Scrolls V: Skyrim, Orvus in 2009's Ratchet & Clank Future: A Crack in Time, and narrated the cutscenes and menus for the 2013 video game Runner2, the 2018 video game Runner3, appearing as a hidden playable character in the latter, and the 2023 video game Bit.Trip Rerunner via update in 2026. Martinet also narrated for the 2020 Netflix docuseries High Score. Martinet provided the voice of Magenta in the English dub of the 2022 anime film Dragon Ball Super: Super Hero, which he would later reprise his role in Dragon Ball Legends in 2023 and Dragon Ball: The Breakers in 2024 as DLC. Martinet also narrated for the 2025 film collection Ultraman 4K Discovery.

=== Departure from voice acting in the Mario franchise ===
Martinet had stated in 2021 that he wanted to voice Mario for the rest of his life, and also said that he would ask Nintendo to find a successor in the case he would think that he cannot perform the voice anymore. Following the release of the first trailer for Super Mario Bros. Wonder in June 2023, gaming publications reported widespread fan speculation that Martinet was no longer voicing Mario because the character's voice sounded different. On August 21, 2023, Nintendo of America announced on Twitter that Martinet would be retiring from providing voice acting for the Super Mario games but would continue to work with Nintendo as "Mario Ambassador". The final Mario game released prior to this that features his voice was 2022's Mario + Rabbids Sparks of Hope, while the final project in the franchise to feature his voice was 2023's The Super Mario Bros. Movie. On September 7, 2023, Nintendo posted a video on Twitter featuring Martinet and Miyamoto, in which Miyamoto introduced Martinet's role as Mario Ambassador and thanked him for his many years of voicing Nintendo characters.

Kevin Afghani subsequently took over the role of Mario and Luigi starting with Super Mario Bros. Wonder (2023), Wario beginning in WarioWare: Move It! (2023), Waluigi with Super Mario Party Jamboree (2024), as well as Baby Mario and Baby Luigi in Mario Kart World (2025).

Following his departure from voice acting for the Mario franchise, Nintendo has continued to use Martinet's archived voice recordings in certain media, such as re-releases, remasters and remakes of Super Mario games, in which he originally provided voice work, and for attractions at Super Nintendo World. Martinet's voice was also used for Mario in Real-Time at the Nintendo New York store, which enabled real-time interaction with the character using a computer-controlled system, described as the AI-VActor system, based on Martinet's recorded vocal performances.

=== Mario Ambassador ===
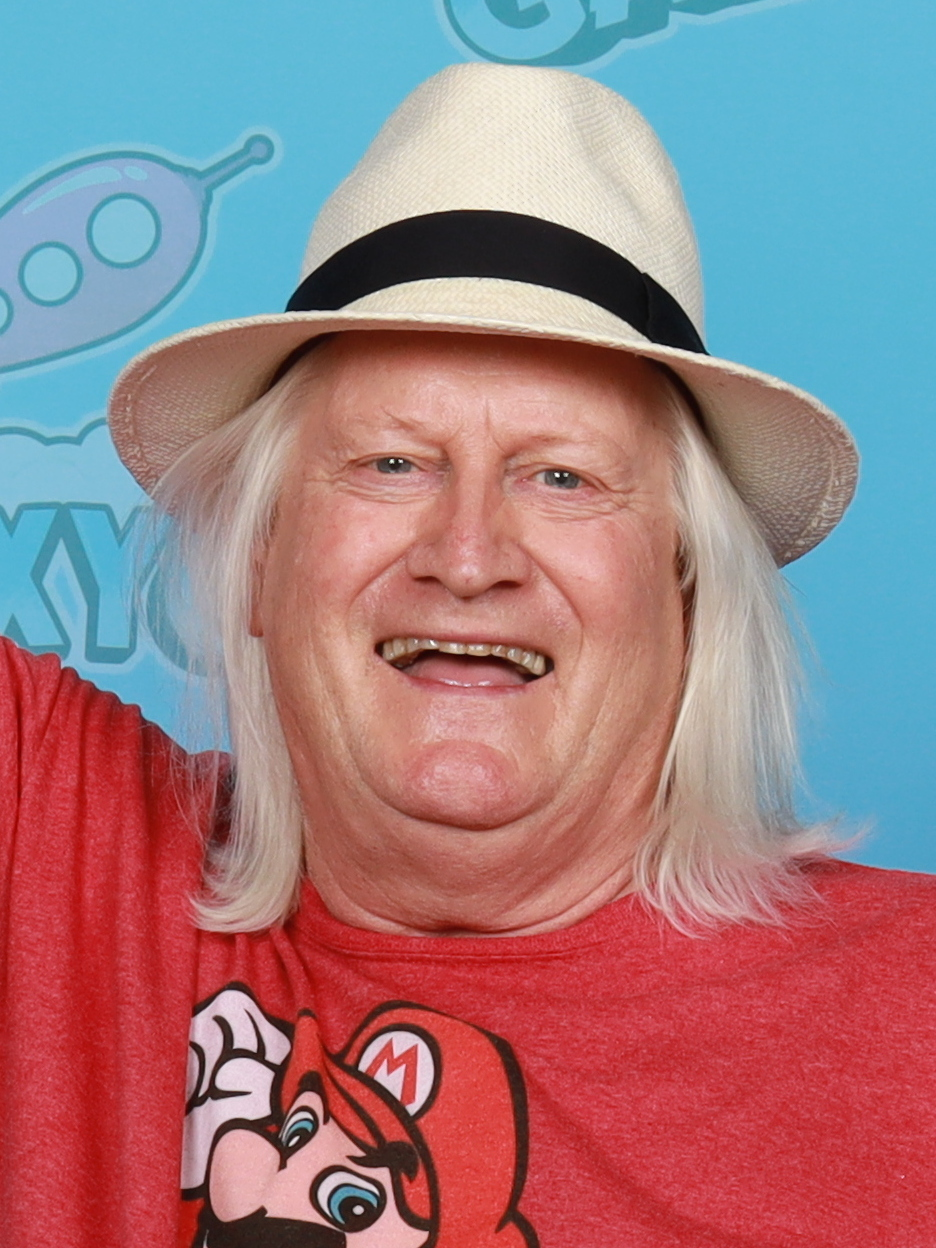
Martinet in 2024

"Mario Ambassador" is the brand ambassador role conferred by Nintendo to Martinet following his departure from voicing characters in the Mario franchise. The role entails promoting the Mario franchise by interacting with fans, signing autographs, and performing the voices of Mario characters at events around the world. Martinet's transition to the Mario Ambassador role was officially announced on social networking website Twitter on August 21, 2023. Martinet's role as Mario Ambassador was later elaborated upon in a video released on September 7, 2023. In the video, he expressed enthusiasm about the opportunity to meet Mario fans around the world at future events.

As Mario Ambassador, Martinet has attended several fan expos and some official Nintendo events, such as Nintendo Live 2024 Sydney and Nintendo Live 2025 Tokyo. As a part of the "Super Mario Bros. 40th Anniversary", he made a guest appearance in a series of Q&A videos titled "40 Questions for Charles Martinet", which were published on the Nintendo Today! app from February to March 2026.

In June 2025, it was reported that Martinet is not allowed to perform Mario's voice at conventions. He later confirmed that he was still allowed to perform Mario's voice, but would not improvise non-Mario phrases to maintain the integrity of the character.

== Public appearances ==
=== Public appearances at events ===
As the former voice of Mario, Martinet has become a well-known personality and has made public appearances at several video game related events where he meets fans for chat, photographs, and autographs. He has made regular appearances at game events such as Electronic Entertainment Expo, Gamescom, and the Eurogamer Expo, and at launch events of games like Super Mario Galaxy (2007), its sequel Super Mario Galaxy 2 (2010) and Super Mario Odyssey (2017).

=== Mario in Real Time ===
Martinet frequently appeared at Nintendo promotional events and trade shows during the 1990s, 2000s, and 2010s through the interactive live-performance system "Mario in Real Time" (MIRT). He portrayed Mario while interacting directly with audiences through motion-capture and voice performance technology. During the show, he also voiced other characters, including Luigi, Wario, and Donkey Kong. Because of the long shifts, Martinet suggested that Stevie Coyle take over his roles during breaks.

== Personal life ==
In 2013, Martinet was evicted from his home in Sausalito, California following a legal dispute with the family of the recently deceased landlord. Dissatisfied with other homes in his price range, Martinet lived a nomadic lifestyle for the next five years, focusing his time on game events.

Martinet, having spent a large portion of his youth in Europe, speaks fluent French and Spanish, as well as some Italian. He resides in the Netherlands with his partner.

== Filmography ==
=== Film ===
Year	Title	Role	Notes	Ref.
1986	Hard Traveling	Dist. Atty. Cobb		
1988	The Dead Pool	Police Station Reporter #1		
1995	Nine Months	Arnie		
1996	The Hunchback of Notre Dame	Tambourine, Baron	Direct-to-video; Voice role	
1997	Beauty and the Beast	Red-Suited Ghost	Direct-to-video; Voice role	
1997	Anastasia	Yellow Bird, Pierre, General, Rasputin's Dog	Direct-to-video (uncredited); Also screenplay; Voice role	
1997	The Game	Nicholas' Father		
2000	The Red Shoes	Rat 3	Direct-to-video; Voice role	
2001	Little Angels: The Brightest Christmas	Zeke	Direct-to-video; Also writer; Voice role	
2001	The Legend of Atlantis	Grypthos	Direct-to-video; Voice role	
2004	Reader Rabbit: The Great Alphabet Race	Captain Ratbeard	Direct-to-video; Voice role	
2005	The Californians	City Councilman		
2022	Dragon Ball Super: Super Hero	Magenta	English dub; Voice role	
2023	The Super Mario Bros. Movie	Mario and Luigi's father, Giuseppe	Cameo roles and multilanguage voice-over	
2025	Ultraman 4K Discovery	The Theater Manager / Narrator	English dub; Film collection; Voice role	

=== Television ===
Year	Title	Role	Notes	Ref.
1986	Brotherhood of Justice	Deputy	Television film	
1989	Midnight Caller	Mark Heller	Episode: "Blood Red"	
1992	The Last of His Tribe	Assistant Museum Director	Television film	
1994	JoJo's Bizarre Adventure	Senator Wilson Philips, Speedwagon Foundation Pilot B (voice)	2 episodes	
1996–1998	Nash Bridges	Jean-Yves, Tony, Hermsdorf	3 episodes	
1998	Air America	David Dixon	Episode: "Fever"	
2016	2016 Kids' Choice Awards	Mario, Luigi	Television special; Cameo appearance	
2020	High Score	Narrator	6 episodes	
2024	That Time I Got Reincarnated as a Slime	Additional voices	1 episode	

=== Video games ===
Year	Title	Role (voice acting)	Notes	Ref.
1993	Police Quest: Open Season	Prostitute, Billy Bob, Janitor		
1994	Super Punch-Out!!	Little Mac, Announcer, Referee, Boxers	Credited under "Special Thanks", roles shared with Mike Shapiro	
1994	Mario Teaches Typing	Mario	CD-ROM version only	
1995	Mario's Game Gallery	Mario		
1995	Solar Eclipse	Spinner		
1995	Space Quest 6	Pa Conshohocken, Ray Trace, P'Tooie		
1996	Super Mario 64	Mario		
1996	Mario Kart 64	Mario, Luigi, Wario, Narrator	All versions (for Mario); North American/European versions (for Luigi and Wario); Credited as Charles Martinee	
1997	Grossology: The Science of Really Gross Things	Additional Voices		
1997	Mario Teaches Typing 2	Mario	Uncredited	
1997	Excitebike: Bun Bun Mario Battle Stadium	Mario		
1998	Mario Party	Mario	Credited as Charles Martinee	
1998	Dr. Seuss Kindergarten	Cat in the Hat		
1998	Dr. Seuss Preschool	Cat in the Hat, Yertle the Turtle		
1998	Madeline Classroom Companion: 1st & 2nd Grade Reading	Lord Cucuface		
1998	Reader Rabbit's 2nd Grade	Monstrous Mirror, Sir Drayson Dragon		
1998	The ClueFinders 4th Grade Adventures: Puzzle of the Pyramid	Sir Alistair Loveless		
1998	The ClueFinders Math Adventures	Guide		
1999	Super Smash Bros.	Mario, Luigi	Reused voices Credited as Charles Martinee	
1999	Mario Golf	Mario, Luigi, Baby Mario, Wario, Metal Mario	Credited as Charles Martinee	
1999	Dr. Seuss Toddler	Cat in the Hat		
1999	Carmen Sandiego's Great Chase Through Time	William Shakespeare, Ludwig van Beethoven		
1999	Slave Zero	Old One, Sangonar		
1999	Mario Party 2	Mario		
1999	Star Wars: X-Wing Alliance	Admiral Holtz, Rebel Pilot 8		
1999	Rising Zan: The Samurai Gunman	Master Suzuki		
1999	Spawn	Clown, The Curse		
1999	Reader Rabbit's Math Ages 6-9	Captain Ratbeard		
2000	Mario Tennis	Mario, Luigi, Baby Mario, Wario, Waluigi		
2000	Skies of Arcadia	Vigoro	English dub	
2000	The ClueFinders Search and Solve Adventures	Jacques Ramone		
2000	Mario Party 3	Mario, Luigi, Wario, Waluigi		
2001	Super Mario Advance	Mario, Luigi, Wart, Mouser, Tryclyde, Clawgrip, Fryguy, Announcer	Uncredited	
2001	Dr. Mario 64	Dr. Mario/Metal Mario, Wario/Vampire Wario		
2001	Forever Kingdom	Darsul	English dub	
2001	Wario Land 4	Wario		
2001	Luigi's Mansion	Luigi, Mario		
2001	Cel Damage	Fowl Mouth, Fleming, Brian the Brain, Fleming's Friend		
2001	Star Wars: Galactic Battlegrounds	2-1B, AT-AT Driver, OOM-9		(click the checkmark and look near the center of the image to confirm all of them)
2001	Reader Rabbit Preschool: Sparkle Star Rescue	Ratbeard		
2001	Reader Rabbit 1st Grade: Capers on Cloud Nine!	Irvin the Inventor		
2001	Reader Rabbit 2nd Grade: Mis-cheese-ious Dreamship Adventures!	Ratbeard, Professor Heathormen		
2001	Super Smash Bros. Melee	Mario, Luigi, Dr. Mario	Reused voices	
2001	Super Mario Advance 2: Super Mario World	Mario, Luigi, Announcer	Uncredited	
2001	The ClueFinders: The Incredible Toy Store Adventure!	Pericles Lear		
2001	Shadow of Memories	Homunculus		
2001	Mario Kart: Super Circuit	Mario		
2001	Mad Dash Racing	Spanx, Ash, Hex's Minion, Gex		
2002	The ClueFinders: Mystery Mansion Arcade	Alistair Loveless, Pericles Lear		
2002	Jet Set Radio Future	Gouji Rokkaku		
2002	Star Wars: Jedi Knight II: Jedi Outcast	Bespin Cop 2, Civilian Male, Imperial Officer 2, Rebel Shock Troop 3		
2002	Super Mario Sunshine	Mario, Pianta (Male), Isle Delfino Commercial		
2002	Mario Party 4	Mario, Luigi, Wario, Waluigi		
2002	Magic Pengel: The Quest for Color	Marshal		
2002	StarFlyers: Royal Jewel Rescue	Vexar, Alien Customer		
2002	StarFlyers: Alien Space Chase	Vexar		
2002	Shinobi	Additional voices	English dub	
2002	The House of the Dead III	Dr. Curien	Uncredited, identified by ear by Behind The Voice Actors committee	
2002	Men in Black II: Alien Escape		Credited as C Martinet	
2002	Liberty's Kids	Baron von Steuben, British Sentry		
2003	WarioWare, Inc.: Mega Microgame$	Wario	Uncredited	
2003	Wario World	Wario		
2003	Super Mario Advance 4: Super Mario Bros. 3	Mario, Luigi, Announcer	Uncredited	
2003	Mario Golf: Toadstool Tour	Mario, Luigi, Wario, Waluigi, Shadow Mario		
2003	Gladius	Additional Voices		
2003	WarioWare, Inc.: Mega Party Games!	Wario		
2003	The Lord of the Rings: The Return of the King	Easterlings		
2003	Mario Kart: Double Dash!!	Mario, Luigi, Baby Mario, Baby Luigi, Wario, Waluigi		
2003	Pac-Man Vs.	Mario		
2003	Mario Party 5	Mario, Luigi, Wario, Waluigi	Uncredited	
2003	Mario & Luigi: Superstar Saga	Mario, Luigi		
2004	Mario Golf: Advance Tour	Mario, Luigi, Wario, Waluigi		
2004	Mario vs. Donkey Kong	Mario, Mini Mario		
2004	Paper Mario: The Thousand-Year Door	Mario		
2004	Mario Pinball Land	Mario		
2004	WarioWare: Twisted!	Wario		
2004	Mario Power Tennis	Mario, Luigi, Wario, Waluigi		
2004	The Lord of the Rings: The Third Age	Eaoden, Gimli		
2004	Mario Party 6	Mario, Luigi, Wario, Waluigi	Uncredited	
2004	Super Mario 64 DS	Mario, Luigi, Wario		
2004	WarioWare: Touched!	Wario		
2004	Virtua Quest	Announcer, Snake Eyes, Lau Chan, Shun Di	English dub	
2005	PoPoLoCrois	Gami Gami Devil, Zul, Great Dragon, Sabo	PlayStation Portable version	
2005	Yakuman DS	Mario, Luigi, Wario, Waluigi		
2005	Yoshi Touch & Go	Baby Mario		
2005	Dance Dance Revolution: Mario Mix	Mario, Luigi, Waluigi, Wario	Uncredited	
2005	Mario Superstar Baseball	Mario, Luigi, Wario, Waluigi, Baby Mario, Baby Luigi		
2005	Mario Tennis: Power Tour	Mario, Luigi, Waluigi, Wario (cameo)		
2005	SSX on Tour	Mario, Luigi	GameCube version	
2005	Super Princess Peach	Mario, Luigi		
2005	Mario Party 7	Mario, Luigi, Wario, Waluigi	Uncredited	
2005	Mario Kart DS	Mario, Luigi, Wario, Waluigi		
2005	Mario Kart Arcade GP	Mario, Luigi, Wario, Robo Mario		
2005	Mario & Luigi: Partners in Time	Mario, Luigi, Baby Mario, Baby Luigi		
2005	Super Mario Strikers	Mario, Luigi, Wario, Waluigi		
2006	New Super Mario Bros.	Mario, Luigi		
2006	Mario Hoops 3-on-3	Mario, Luigi, Wario, Waluigi		
2006	Mario vs. Donkey Kong 2: March of the Minis	Mario, Mini Mario	Uncredited	
2006	WarioWare: Smooth Moves	Wario	Uncredited	
2007	Mario Kart Arcade GP 2	Mario, Luigi, Waluigi, Wario, Robo Mario	Uncredited	
2007	Wario: Master of Disguise	Wario	Uncredited	
2007	Super Paper Mario	Mario, Luigi	Uncredited	
2007	Mario Strikers Charged	Mario, Luigi, Wario, Waluigi		
2007	Mario Party 8	Mario, Luigi, Wario, Waluigi		
2007	World in Conflict			
2007	Super Mario Galaxy	Mario, Luigi		
2007	Mario & Sonic at the Olympic Games	Mario, Luigi, Wario, Waluigi		
2007	Mario Party DS	Mario, Luigi, Wario, Waluigi		
2007	Kane & Lynch: Dead Men	The Elder Brother / Vaultbreaker		
2008	Super Smash Bros. Brawl	Mario, Luigi, Wario, Waluigi		
2008	Mario Kart Wii	Mario, Luigi, Wario, Waluigi, Baby Mario, Baby Luigi		
2008	Mario Super Sluggers	Mario, Luigi, Wario, Waluigi, Baby Mario, Baby Luigi		
2008	Wario Land: Shake It!	Wario		
2008	WarioWare: Snapped!	Wario		
2009	Mario & Luigi: Bowser's Inside Story	Mario, Luigi		
2009	World in Conflict: Soviet Assault			
2009	WarioWare D.I.Y.	Wario		
2009	WarioWare: D.I.Y. Showcase	Wario		
2009	Mario vs. Donkey Kong: Minis March Again!	Mario, Mini Mario	Uncredited	
2009	Ratchet & Clank Future: A Crack in Time	Orvus		
2009	Way of the Samurai 3	Genjuro Matsuzaki, Narrator	English dub	
2009	Mario & Sonic at the Olympic Winter Games	Mario, Luigi, Wario, Waluigi		
2009	New Super Mario Bros. Wii	Mario, Luigi		
2010	Resonance of Fate	Cardinal Lagerfeld	English dub	
2010	Super Mario Galaxy 2	Mario, Luigi		
2010	Mario vs. Donkey Kong: Mini-Land Mayhem!	Mario, Mini Mario	Uncredited	
2010	Mario Sports Mix	Mario, Luigi, Wario, Waluigi		
2011	Super Mario 3D Land	Mario, Luigi	Uncredited	
2011	AR Games	Mario		
2011	The Elder Scrolls V: Skyrim	Paarthurnax		
2011	Mario & Sonic at the London 2012 Olympic Games	Mario, Luigi, Wario, Waluigi		
2011	Mario Kart 7	Mario, Luigi, Wario, Metal Mario	Uncredited	
2011	Fortune Street	Mario, Luigi, Wario, Waluigi	Uncredited	
2012	Mario Party 9	Mario, Luigi, Wario, Waluigi		
2012	Mario Tennis Open	Mario, Luigi, Wario, Waluigi, Baby Mario		
2012	New Super Mario Bros. 2	Mario, Luigi	Uncredited	
2012	New Super Mario Bros. U	Mario, Luigi		
2013	Luigi's Mansion: Dark Moon	Luigi, Mario		
2013	Mario and Donkey Kong: Minis on the Move	Mario, Mini Mario	Uncredited	
2013	Photos with Mario	Mario, Luigi		
2013	New Super Luigi U	Luigi	Uncredited	
2013	Game & Wario	Wario		
2013	Mario & Luigi: Dream Team	Mario, Luigi		
2013	Mario Kart Arcade GP DX	Mario, Luigi, Wario, Waluigi		
2013	Mario & Sonic at the Sochi 2014 Olympic Winter Games	Mario, Luigi, Wario, Waluigi		
2013	Super Mario 3D World	Mario, Luigi	Uncredited	
2013	Mario Party: Island Tour	Mario, Luigi, Wario, Waluigi		
2013	BIT.TRIP Presents... Runner 2: Future Legend of Rhythm Alien	Narrator		
2014	Mario Golf: World Tour	Mario, Luigi, Wario, Waluigi, Gold Mario		
2014	Mario Kart 8	Mario, Luigi, Wario, Waluigi, Baby Mario, Baby Luigi, Metal Mario	Uncredited	
2014	Super Smash Bros. for Nintendo 3DS and Wii U	Mario, Luigi, Dr. Mario, Wario, Waluigi		
2015	Mario Party 10	Mario, Luigi, Wario, Waluigi		
2015	Mario vs. Donkey Kong: Tipping Stars	Mario, Mini Mario		
2015	Luigi's Mansion Arcade	Luigi		
2015	Super Mario Maker	Mario, Luigi, Waluigi		
2015	Mario Tennis: Ultra Smash	Mario, Luigi, Waluigi, Wario		
2015	Mario & Luigi: Paper Jam	Mario, Luigi		
2015	Puzzle & Dragons: Super Mario Bros. Edition	Mario, Luigi		
2016	Mario & Sonic at the Rio 2016 Olympic Games	Mario, Luigi, Wario, Waluigi		
2016	Paper Mario: Color Splash	Luigi		
2016	Mini Mario & Friends: Amiibo Challenge	Mini Mario, Mini Luigi		
2016	Super Mario Run	Mario, Luigi	Mobile game	
2016	Mario Party: Star Rush	Mario, Luigi, Wario, Waluigi		
2017	Mario Sports Superstars	Mario, Luigi, Wario, Waluigi, Baby Mario, Baby Luigi		
2017	Mario Party: The Top 100	Mario, Luigi, Wario, Waluigi		
2017	Mario + Rabbids Kingdom Battle	Mario, Luigi		
2017	Mario & Luigi: Superstar Saga + Bowser's Minions	Mario, Luigi		
2017	Super Mario Odyssey	Mario, Luigi		
2018	Runner3	Narrator, playable character		
2018	Mario Tennis Aces	Mario, Luigi, Wario, Waluigi		
2018	WarioWare Gold	Wario		
2018	Super Mario Party	Mario, Luigi, Wario, Waluigi		
2018	Luigi's Mansion (Nintendo 3DS)	Luigi, Mario, Gooigi		
2018	Super Smash Bros. Ultimate	Mario, Luigi, Dr. Mario, Wario, Waluigi		
2018	Mario & Luigi: Bowser's Inside Story + Bowser Jr.'s Journey	Mario, Luigi		
2019	Super Mario Maker 2	Mario, Luigi		
2019	Mario Kart Tour	Mario, Luigi, Baby Mario, Baby Luigi, Wario, Waluigi	Mobile game; Includes variants of said characters	
2019	Luigi's Mansion 3	Luigi, Mario, Gooigi		
2019	Mario & Sonic at the Olympic Games Tokyo 2020	Mario, Luigi, Wario, Waluigi		
2020	Paper Mario: The Origami King	Luigi		
2020	Mario Kart Live: Home Circuit	Mario, Luigi		
2021	Bowser's Fury	Mario		
2021	Mario Golf: Super Rush	Mario, Luigi, Wario, Waluigi		
2021	WarioWare: Get It Together!	Wario		
2021	Mario Party Superstars	Mario, Luigi, Wario, Waluigi		
2022	Mario Strikers: Battle League	Mario, Luigi, Wario, Waluigi	Last two Mario game to feature Martinet's voice recordings prior to stepping down	
2022	Mario + Rabbids Sparks of Hope	Mario, Luigi	Last two Mario game to feature Martinet's voice recordings prior to stepping down	
2023	Dragon Ball Legends	Magenta	Mobile game; DLC	
2024	Mario vs. Donkey Kong (Nintendo Switch)	Mario, Mini Mario	Archival recordings	
2024	Paper Mario: The Thousand-Year Door (Nintendo Switch)	Mario, Luigi	Archival recordings	
2024	Dragon Ball: The Breakers	Magenta	DLC	
2026	Bit.Trip Rerunner	Narrator	Added via update	

=== Commercials ===
Title	Role	Notes	Ref.
Sonic the Hedgehog: Hidden Valley Ranch	Narrator		
Got Milk?	Mario		
Mario Golf	Mario	English and Spanish dubs	
Mario Party	Mario		
Mario & Sonic at the Olympic Games	Mario		
McDonald's	Mario		
Wario World	Wario		
Tesco	Wario		

=== Theme park attractions ===
Year	Attraction	Role	Theme Park	Notes	Ref.
2021	Mario Kart: Bowser's Challenge	Mario, Luigi	Super Nintendo World	Archival recordings from Mario Kart 8	
2021	Mario and Luigi meet-and-greet mascots	Mario, Luigi	Super Nintendo World	New voice recordings	

=== Toys ===
Year	Toy	Role	Notes	Ref.
2020	Lego Super Mario	Mario	Voice	
2021	Lego Super Mario	Luigi	Voice	
