= Gay Blade =

Gay Blade may refer to:

- Gay Blades, a 1946 American comedy film directed by George Blair
- Zorro, The Gay Blade, a comedy film from 1981
- The Washington Blade, an LGBT newspaper published in Washington, DC
- The Gaye Blades, a Black Lips side-project
- GayBlade, an LGBT-themed video game for home computers released in 1992
- The Gay Blade, a 1972 anti-homosexuality tract from Chick Publications
