= Mathra =

Mathra may refer to:

- Mathra (textile), Bhutanese type of tartan
- Mathra, Kerala, village in India
- Mathra, Khyber Pakhtunkhwa, village in Pakistan

== See also ==
- Mathra Das Pahwa (1880–1972), Indian eye surgeon
- Mathura (disambiguation)
- The ClueFinders 3rd Grade Adventures: The Mystery of Mathra, video game
