= High Score (TV series) =

Netflix docuseries about video game history

- Genre: Documentary
- Created by: France Costrel
- Directed by: William Acks, Sam LaCroix, France Costrel, Melissa Wood
- Narrated by: Charles Martinet
- Theme music composer: Power Glove
- Country of origin: United States
- No. of seasons: 1
- No. of episodes: 6

Production
- Executive producers: William Acks; Sam LaCroix; France Costrel; Melissa Wood; Courtney Coupe
- Running time: 37-47 minutes
- Production company: Great Big Story

Original release
- Network: Netflix
- Release: August 19, 2020

High Score (Note: GDLK in Brazilian and other similar markets) is a Netflix docuseries created by France Costrel. It features stories and interviews with the developers and creators of early video games. The series first premiered on August 19, 2020.

== Overview ==
High Score features interviews and segments around the creation and development of video games in the 1980s and 1990s. These are intermixed with animated segments rendered in a pixel art-style similar to video games of this period. The show's intro sequence is also animated in the pixel style and includes numerous references to past video games, with its theme song by the Australian band Power Glove. The series is narrated by Charles Martinet, who was the voice actor for Mario from 1994 to 2023.

== Episodes ==
No.	Title	Directed by	Original release date
1	"Boom & Bust"	William Acks; France Costrel; Sam Lacroix	August 19, 2020
Covers the early growth of arcade games and home video game consoles in the late 1970s and early 1980s until the 1983 video game crash. Featured interviews include Tomohiro Nishikado, creator of Space Invaders; Rebecca Heineman, winner of the first Space Invaders U.S. national championship; Doug Macrae, Steve Golson, and Mike Horowitz of General Computer Corporation that made accelerator boards for arcade games; Toru Iwatani, the creator of Pac-Man; Nolan Bushnell, co-founder of Atari, Inc.; Karen and Anderson Lawson, the children of Jerry Lawson who created the use of the game cartridge for the Fairchild Channel F; and Howard Scott Warshaw, the developer of E.T. the Extra-Terrestrial.
2	"Comeback Kid"	William Acks; France Costrel; Sam Lacroix	August 19, 2020
Covers the introduction of Nintendo into America after the 1983 crash through the arcade game Donkey Kong and the Nintendo Entertainment System (NES), and its marketing pushing through the 1990 Nintendo World Championship, the use of Nintendo Game Play Counselors to help with struggling players, and the creation of Nintendo Power. Featured interviews include Hirokazu Tanaka, music composer for several Nintendo games; Gail Tilden, Nintendo of America marketing director that helped to market the NES and Nintendo Power; Jeff Hansen, the winner of the Nintendo World Championship; Shaun Bloom, one of the Game Play Counselors; and John Kirby, the lawyer who represented Nintendo in Universal City Studios, Inc. v. Nintendo Co., Ltd. The episode is dedicated to Kirby who had died in 2019.
3	"Role Players"	William Acks; France Costrel; Sam Lacroix	August 19, 2020
Covers the creation of adventure games and computer role-playing games (RPGs) from their primarily computer-based roots with text-adventures like Colossal Cave Adventure, to graphical adventures like Mystery House and the Ultima series, and into the console RPGs like the Final Fantasy series. Featured interviews include Roberta and Ken Williams, creators of Mystery House; Richard Garriott, creator of the Ultima series; Yoshitaka Amano, artist for Final Fantasy; and Ryan Best, the developer of the LGBT-themed RPG GayBlade.
4	"This is War"	William Acks; France Costrel; Sam Lacroix	August 19, 2020
Covers the "console wars" of Sega's aggressive push to outsell Nintendo in the United States via the Sega Genesis with Sonic the Hedgehog and John Madden Football. Featured interviews include Tom Kalinske, CEO of Sega of America; Hirokazu Yasuhara, gameplay designer of Sonic; Naoto Ohshima, character artist for Sonic; Chris Tang, winner of the 1994 Sega World Championships; Trip Hawkins, founder of Electronic Arts; Joe Ybarra, producer of John Madden Football; and Gordon Bellamy, developer for the Madden NFL series to help introduce black athletes into the John Madden Football series.
5	"Fight!"	William Acks; France Costrel; Sam Lacroix	August 19, 2020
Covers the creation of fighting games including Street Fighter II and Mortal Kombat, which set the basis of modern eSport competitions. It also covers the controversy that Mortal Kombat generated that, along with Night Trap, led to the 1993 Congressional hearings that pushed for the creation of the Entertainment Software Rating Board (ESRB). Featured interviews include Akira Nishitani and Akira Yasuda, designers of Street Fighter II; John Tobias, co-creator of the Mortal Kombat series; Takahiro Nakano, winner of the 1993 Street Fighter II Turbo Championship in Japan, and current owner of Nakano Sagat eSports team; and Jim Riley, creator of Night Trap.
6	"Level Up"	William Acks; France Costrel; Sam Lacroix	August 19, 2020
Covers the transition from 2D to 3D computer graphics in 1993 by both Nintendo on consoles with Star Fox, and for computers - along with the introduction of online multiplayer gaming - by id Software with Doom. Featured interviews include John Romero, creator of Doom; Dylan Cuthbert and Giles Goddard, who helped to create Star Fox; and a final retrospective by Nolan Bushnell on the development of Pong from Spacewar!

== Production ==
Creator France Costrel said that she was inspired to create the documentary as, growing up in France but having American friends, "[video games] are a universal language". She had worked as the showrunner for "8-Bit Legacy", a video game documentary for Great Big Story, but recognized it only covered a portion of the history of the industry. She developed a pitch for Netflix, getting help from her colleagues from the show Dark Net and Melissa Wood. Costrel had wanted to shift focus away from the games themselves as most video game documentaries, and instead to the developers behind the games and players to give insights into the creativity on video game development. Costrel decided not to try to tell a full history of video games but limit it to overarching and cohesive stories of certain periods in the industry. Costrel and Wood said it made sense to start at the onset of arcade and console games to bookend one side of their story, and opted to end with the transition into 3D computer graphics as it "make a natural ending, a new kind of stepping stone in the history of gaming".

In researching their stories, Costrel said that most of the video game companies were open to working with them to showcase the case, while some of the creators had left the industry and were also ready to share their stories. While Costrel estimated they had material for about twenty hours of content they had to whittle this to the six episodes and focused more on those stories that would be of interest across all types of game players, not just hardcore gamers.

One of the games featured in the series was GayBlade by Ryan Best who had created it in the 1990s. As explained in the show, while moving from Hawaii to California, all his own copies of the game were lost, and could not find any other copies elsewhere, which he had explained to the producers during production. The producers had researched online for the game to find any copies to use for the show; near the end of post-production, they had been contacted by the Schwules Museum in Berlin, who was able to supply them with a copy of the game who then returned the copy to Best. The game was added to the Internet Archive and playable there via emulation after its discovery.

Costrel serves as director along with William Acks, Sam LaCroix, and Melissa Wood; all four along with Courtney Coupe also are the show's executive producers.

== Reception ==
The series was well received by journalists as a well-put-together overview of the early video game period. GameSpot called the series "a crash course on the golden age of gaming filled with insightful interviews, brilliant writing, and most importantly, an inspiring and inclusive message." Slash Film called the series "one of the most sleek and satisfying historical accounts of the early decades of video games, even if it's not a definitive, comprehensive account of the ups and downs of the industry as a whole." The Hollywood Reporter said "It's far from Netflix's best or most substantive doc — it's often rather superficial and full of gaping holes — but in terms of sheer bingeing ease, with six episodes, none running over 47 minutes, High Score is tough to top. It's light and fun and full of entertaining trivia, with a willingness to go just far enough off the beaten path that some of it will even be new for its core demo."

Ars Technica compared the series favorably in light of its own series of "War Stories" documentaries as a solid look at this era of video games, but noted that High Score has some notable omissions, such as Tetris.

The A.V. Club was more critical of the disjointed narrative provided by the series, though praised the use of interviews with minor figures from the industry's history, saying "These personal and often unexpected stories are easily the highlight of High Score, and they're occasionally the only thing that saves it from turning into the public school version of a video game history lesson." Slate criticized the series for sidelining some equally important developments such as the Wizardry series alongside Ultima, and for not bringing up modern parallels, such as crunch time in the video gaming industry. The Verge praised the series for presenting underrepresented figures within video games like Heineman, Lawson, and Best but argued that the show presented them as those doing "boundary-pushing work", and failed to show the more realistic conditions of the video game industry of that timeframe and which remained a problem in current state of the video game industry.

Rotten Tomatoes gives the series a 76% aggregate rating from 25 critics.
