= Mario Teaches Typing =

1992 educational game

- Developers: Interplay Productions; Presage Software (Macintosh)
- Publishers: NA: Interplay Productions; EU: Electronic Arts
- Producer: Thomas Decker
- Designer: Thomas Decker
- Programmers: Kurt Dekker; Jay Patel
- Series: Mario
- Platforms: MS-DOS, Windows, Macintosh
- Release: MS-DOS: NA: Q3 1992; Enhanced CD-ROM: NA: Q4 1993; Macintosh: NA: 1993; Enhanced Macintosh: NA: May 11, 1995
- Genres: Educational, Typing game
- Mode: Single-player

Mario Teaches Typing is an educational video game developed and published by Interplay Productions for MS-DOS compatible operating systems, Windows, and Macintosh. It uses the Mario character, licensed from Nintendo, to teach keyboard skills. Featuring several modes of difficulty, it teaches typing letters, words, and sentences using aesthetics from Mario games.

Interplay aimed to replicate the success of the Mavis Beacon Teaches Typing software. Nintendo agreed as it was expanding into more creative and educational products. Interplay released Mario Teaches Typing on floppy disk in 1992 and then published an enhanced version on CD-ROM in 1993.

A sequel, Mario Teaches Typing 2, was developed by Brainstorm and published by Interplay in 1997. Like the enhanced version, it updated the interface and added features. Mario Teaches Typing was the first time Mario spoke in a video game, originally by Ronald Ruben for the initial release and then by Charles Martinet for the CD release. Afterward, Martinet became the official international voice for the character until 2023.

Mario Teaches Typing frequently appeared in top ten sales charts of educational software from 1992 to 1996 and sold 800,000 copies. All versions received a mixed reception by publications, with the earlier releases receiving more favorable reviews than the sequel. Praise focused on the use of the Mario franchise in the presentation and its appeal to children. Critics were divided as to its competency as a typing tutorial. Reviewers felt Mario Teaches Typing was more suitable for children than Mavis Beacon Teaches Typing. Nintendo continued the relationship with Interplay until ceasing endeavors outside Nintendo systems in the late 1990s.

== Gameplay ==
As Mario (center) moves through the beginner stage, blocks and turtles with letters appear. The player must type the corresponding letter to break the block or defeat the Koopa Troopa. Statistics like time and words per minute are tracked at the bottom of the screen along with a teaching aid that displays which finger should be used to type at the time.

Mario Teaches Typing is a single-player educational typing game aimed at teaching children touch typing. From the Main Menu screen, the player can select lessons as well as manage student profiles and lesson settings. As part of their profile, the player can set a words per minute (WPM) goal and change the player character to Mario, Luigi, or Princess Peach. Reaching the WPM goal will provide the player with a printable certificate. Via settings in a lessons menu, courses can focus on the home row only or include specific segments of the keyboard; for example, the bottom and number rows can be included with the home row, or the lesson can encompass the whole keyboard. Localized versions were also published, such as a German release that supports QWERTZ keyboards and umlauts.

There are three lessons of increasing difficulty. They mimic the side-scrolling gameplay of the Super Mario series whereby typing correctly results in the player character attacking enemies and navigating the stage. During lessons, the status bar displays statistics that track the player's progress: play time, number of keys typed, WPM, and number of errors. The bar includes a diagram of a pair of hands as a teaching aid; the finger needed to type the next letter will be highlighted. Completing a lesson will prompt a scoring screen with a performance summary.

The first stage, "Mario's Smash & Dash", is a beginner lesson—the player types individual letters—set outdoors where the player character smashes blocks and jumps on Koopa Troopas. The next stage, "Mario's Wet Word Challenge", is an intermediate lesson in which the player must type words. Set underwater, the player character swims ahead of dangerous sea creatures by completing words. The final stage, called "Mario's Tunnel of Doom", is an advanced lesson set in an underground castle that tasks the player with typing complete sentences in order for the player-character to run past falling Thwomps and escape segments of quicksand. A typing drill practice mode named "Mario's Expert Express" is also available from the main menu screen.

== Development ==
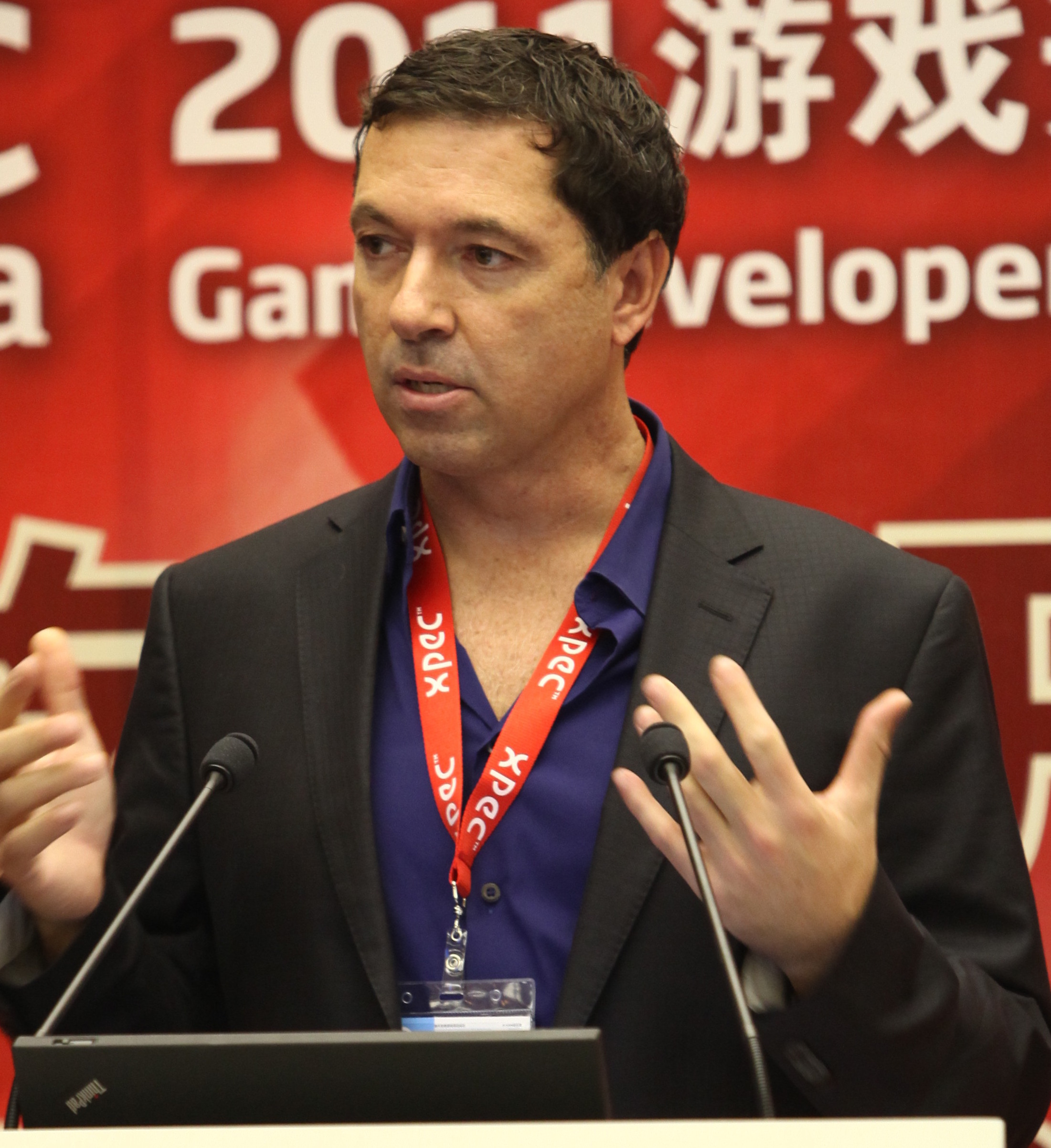
Interplay Productions' Brian Fargo (shown in 2011) conceived Mario Teaches Typing.

Mario Teaches Typing was developed and published by Interplay Productions. Thomas Decker produced and designed the game with Kurt Dekker and Jay Patel as the programmers. Art was handled by Dave Mosher, Todd Camasta, and Patrick Whelan. Ronald B. Ruben provided the voice for Mario; it was the first time that the character had spoken in a game. David Govet along with George Sanger arranged the music while Hamilton Altstatt handled the sound effects. The game reuses music from Super Mario World.

Brian Fargo, who was the head of Interplay at the time, conceived the game's idea. He was acquaintances with media personality Les Crane, who had developed the 1987 educational typing game Mavis Beacon Teaches Typing. The success inspired Fargo to create a typing game of his own. He had heard that the majority of the purchases were by parents wanting to teach their children how to type. Fargo felt that Mario would be a good teacher for children.

Interplay's vice president, Richard Lehrberg, had a working relationship with Nintendo, which owns the character, and helped secure the usage rights. Fargo pitched the idea to Nintendo, who was enthusiastic about the concept and agreed to Mario's inclusion. Following Nintendo's success in North America, it began to explore educational and creative games in response to negative sentiments from parents in the 1980s that video games were detrimental to children. Additionally, the corporation felt that a few educational computer games would not damage their industry dominance at the time. Mario's creator, Shigeru Miyamoto, was not involved with Mario Teaches Typing's development.

== Release and versions ==
Version release timeline
1992	Original: MS-DOS on floppy disk
1993	Original: Macintosh on floppy disk
1993	Enhanced: MS-DOS on CD-ROM
1994
1995	Enhanced: Macintosh on CD-ROM
1996
1997	Sequel: Windows and Macintosh on hybrid CD-ROM

Mario Teaches Typing was released in the United States in 1992 and in the United Kingdom in 1993. Interplay promoted it at the Summer Consumer Electronics Show (CES) in June 1992. The next month, software retailers began advertising they had Mario Teaches Typing in stock for sale. Interplay first released Mario Teaches Typing on floppy disk for MS-DOS compatible home computers. The software displays in either EGA and VGA graphics. Interplay later provided a downloadable demo version of the MS-DOS release on its website, as well as a software patch related to problems with Sound Blaster 16 sound cards.

Near the end of 1992, Interplay advertised its intent to release a version for Macintosh computers. MacPlay, a division of Interplay, published the Macintosh version in 1993. Presage Software handled the converting process to the Apple platform. Like the original release, Interplay promoted the Macintosh port at the Winter CES in January 1994. Interplay later signed a publishing deal with Mindscape in 1998, which allowed the latter to distribute the software.

=== Enhanced CD-ROM ===
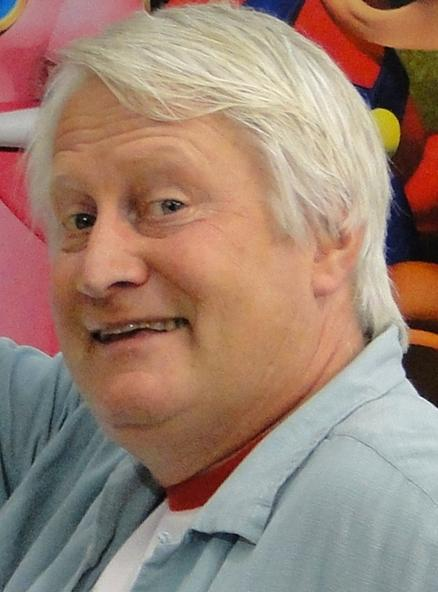
Following his performance, Charles Martinet (shown in 2010) voiced Mario in multiple games for decades.

Interplay later produced an enhanced version on CD-ROM. In addition to an updated interface, the developers added videos of Mario-In-Real-Time using VActor (Virtual Actor) Character Animation technology developed by SimGraphics Engineering. Mario-In-Real-Time began as a technology demonstration at video game trade shows. Nintendo's exhibit had a monitor that displayed a 3D floating Mario head, which was controlled by an off-stage actor who would make the onscreen Mario interact with attendees. Charles Martinet took over Mario's voice acting duties for the CD version; Nintendo hired Martinet in 1990 to voice the Mario-In-Real-Time demonstrations for trade shows. Similar to the trade shows, he performed the character's motions and expressions for Mario Teaches Typing through virtual actor tracking sensors.

Martinet considered Mario Teaches Typing one of his favorite and most important Mario projects as it helped him understand Mario from a child's perspective. He concluded that the character would never be in a negative mindset. When he saw criticism for failing in the script, such as "Oh that wasn't very good, try again", he suggested that the dialogue encourage the user to continue trying, such as, "Not as good this time, but you're gonna do it better this time, let's go!"

At the 1993 Summer CES, Interplay announced that the CD version would be released later that year. Retailers began advertising it for sale by November 1993. MacPlay later released the enhanced CD-ROM version on Macintosh computers running System 7 or higher in May 1995. Decker again served as producer.

=== Mario Teaches Typing 2 ===
Mario Teaches Typing 2
- The sequel's cover features brighter colors based on focus group testing.
- Developer: Brainstorm
- Publisher: Interplay Productions
- Producers: Thomas Decker; Larry Lesser
- Designers: Larry Lesser; Kirk Tome
- Programmer: Jim Gordon
- Artist: Stephen Beam
- Composers: Rick Jackson; Brian Luziette; Ron Valdez
- Series: Mario
- Platforms: Windows, Macintosh
- Release: March 31, 1997
- Genre: Educational
- Mode: Single-player

Developed by Interplay's Brainstorm division for Windows and Mac platforms, Mario Teaches Typing 2 was also aimed at children. The division was formed in late 1996 to focus on Interplay's educational software for children. The sequel features the lessons from the original and adds an onscreen color-coded keyboard as well as the option to customize lesson plans. The beginner, intermediate, and advanced stages return, as well as the drill-based practice mode. The onscreen keyboard mode displays a keyboard with the keys color coded to corresponding fingers in order to familiarize players with touch typing finger placement. Pressing the keys produce a Mario-themed animation.

Decker produced Mario Teaches Typing 2 with Larry Lesser as associate producer. Lesser and Kirk Tome designed the game with Jim Gordon as the programmer. The art team was led by Stephen Beam. Rick Jackson, Brian Luzietti, and Ron Valdez collaborated on the music while Greg Allen created the sound effects with Pfiefer Digital Sound. Sean Cramer oversaw the typing lessons.

News of the sequel emerged in late 1995. When unveiling the division's creation on November 1, 1996, Brainstorm also announced its intent to publish Mario Teaches Typing 2 on a hybrid CD. Interplay began advertising it near the end of 1996; it was included in a promotion in which Interplay would rebate a portion of the purchase of select games bought in the last quarter of 1996. Brainstorm launched its website, which included product information, around the same time. The company announced Mario Teaches Typing 2 in a press release in March 1997. Brainstorm's marketing staff conducted focus groups with parents when designing the packaging. Based on feedback, the box features bright colors, large screen shots, and a checklist of product features. In 1999, the game was bundled with the LittleFingers Keyboard, a smaller-sized keyboard marketed for children.

== Reception ==
=== Sales ===
Mario Teaches Typing sold more than 800,000 copies. Fargo considered it a success. The software frequently appeared in top education sales charts for years after its initial release. The MS-DOS version entered PC Research's top selling home education list at number ten for August 1992, based on collective sales from Software Etc., Babbage's, Waldensoftware, and Electronics Boutique. The following month, the organization reported that it was the sixth-bestselling software in home education and the ninth top-selling education game. PC Research also reported that Mario Teaches Typing was the sixth top-selling IBM PC education game in September 1992. It dropped to ninth the following month and tenth in December 1992. At the Software Etc. chain of stores, it was the fifth-bestselling educational software for the week ending December 19, 1992. By January 1993, the title remained number ten on PC Research's list of top-selling IBM PC education games before returning to number nine in February.

According to PC Data, Mario Teaches Typing was the number eight top education software in July 1994. In November 1995, MultiMedia Merchandising magazine listed the game eighth on its top education bestsellers chart, based on a compilation of industry surveys and retail reports across the four formats. It remained on the list the following months, dropping to number 15 in December and then rising to number 12 in January 1996. The next month, Mario Teaches Typing dropped back to fifteenth place, based on sales of only the PC and Mac CD-ROM versions. Also in 1996, PC Data noted that the enhanced CD-ROM Macintosh version was the tenth best-selling Macintosh software of June 1996, as well as the eighth top-selling software for the Macintosh in the first half of the year.

=== Critical response ===
Reception

Review scores
Publication	Score
AllGame	3.5/5
Aktueller Software Markt	11/12
PCMag	3/4
Evening Sentinel	80%
Electronic Games	B+
HomePC	4/4
MacUser	4/5
PC Review	5/10
Play Time	73%

Mario Teaches Typing received mixed reviews. Commentators were split as to whether all audiences would benefit. Several reviewers compared it to Mavis Beacon Teaches Typing; they felt Mario Teaches Typing was a better fit for children and suggested the former for older users. Despite the commentary, Crane reportedly expressed dissatisfaction towards Fargo for creating a successful competitor against Mavis Beacon Teaches Typing.

The Oregonian writer Randy Chase praised Mario Teaches Typing as engaging for children yet practical for adults. He wrote that it could comfortably transition children from video games to the "sometimes intimidating world of home computers". PC Magazine echoed similar statements, writing that the familiarity of Mario and the excitement of gaming would keep children interested in typing lessons. MacUser's reviewers and Cameron Crotty of Macworld concurred, stating that the Mario-themed presentation lessened the tedium of typing drills. Both publications recommended Mario Teaches Typing for all levels of typists. HomePC's editors observed children aged between three and fourteen to compile their review. They considered it a good typing program and praised the option to designate which keyboard rows to include in the lessons. The editors noted that the children enjoyed the program, which they attributed to Mario's inclusion making the tasks approachable. The editors of Electronic Games included Mario Teaches Typing in their recommendations for the 1992-1993 holiday season, commenting that it can appeal to all ages despite being geared towards children. Similarly, the editors of HomePC magazine named it one of the best software titles of 1994 in their holiday shopping guide.

Writing for Electronic Games, Laurie Yates felt that PC CD-ROM release of Mario Teaches Typing stood out among the rise of child-focused typing programs at the time and recommended it, saying that it is a contender as the sole typing program for families. The Daily Gazette's Michael Himowitz noted that his child enjoyed the game. Lonnie Brown of the Lakeland Ledger compared it to Mavis Beacon Teaches Typing, noting that while Mario Teaches Typing would appeal to children more, the other title provides more thorough lessons.

The reception in the United Kingdom was mixed. Sue James of PC Review was critical, finding it less effective and more "gimmicky" than similar games. While she noted the addition of the teaching aid on the status bar, James felt the amount of activity on the screen precludes players from using it. She wrote that the animations and sound effects hindered rather encouraged learning. James considered the passive error tallying, which did not interrupt the user's pace, and the less distracting drill-based mode as positive aspects along with the statistical feedback during and after lessons. Conversely, Steve Fountain of the Evening Sentinel rated the Windows CD version 80%. While pointing out that the premise seemed out-of-character, he wrote that the program is not as enjoyable as a normal computer game but a "better than ploughing through a dull typing manual".

Mario Teaches Typing fared better with the German video game press. Heinrich Lenhardt, the co-editor-in-chief of PC Player, regarded Mario Teaches Typing as a competent alternative to ten-finger typewriter courses, although he believed its usefulness would be limited to hobbyists and considered it inadequate for experienced typists like secretaries. Writing for Play Time, Martin Müller considered the drill-based mode a positive addition for those that might find the presentation of the regular lessons too distracting. While he questioned whether a Mario-themed typing program was needed, Müller did acknowledge that he found the lessons enjoyable at times. Gerda Arnold of Aktueller Software Markt lauded it as a fun typing game and felt the design lends itself to an individual's own pace. He praised the presentation and accurate German localization but noted that typing too fast can cause the animations during lessons to become spasmodic.

The 3D Mario head in the enhanced CD-ROM version was a frequent point of discussion. Brown commented that younger audiences would enjoy the it. Himowitz complimented the feature's inclusion for offering guidance. Conversely, he criticized the Italian accent. Fountain also criticized Mario's voice, calling the accent "ridiculous".

==== Sequel ====
Mario Teaches Typing 2 Reception

Review scores
Publication	Score
AllGame	3/5
Macworld	4.1/10
MacHome Journal	3/5
The Oregonian	C−

The sequel was not as well received by publications, who focused on the program's audiovisuals and effectiveness. Reviewers were critical of the presentation for being geared towards young children and alienating older users. The Oregonian's reviewer wrote that the audiovisuals had "cheesey graphics and carnival music" but noted that Nintendo fans would find it familiar. Heidi Aycock of PC Gamer called the graphics "blocky" and the music "annoying". Commenting on the 3D talking Mario, she described it as "unpleasant" and its accent as an "old, bad joke". Susan Ashworth of MacHome Journal felt the onscreen action could be distracting and described the 3D Mario head as "more bizarre than motivating". Writing for MacWorld, Suzanne Courteau felt that the visuals looked outdated and that the "goofy" aspect repelled most teenagers and adults.

Commentators were divided on whether Mario Teaches Typing 2 was a suitable typing tutor. Savignano believed that children would find the Mario theme "friendly and funny" but adults would be turned off by the "juvenile look and set-up"; she recommended that older students find a "more mature typing program". Courteau criticized it as "lackluster". She felt the gameplay-like animations, the lack of background information for younger users, and the choice of typewriter style over computer keyboarding negatively impacted the lessons. Courteau ended her review suggesting users try an in-person course or Mavis Beacon Teaches Typing instead. Conversely, Ashworth wrote that Mario Teaches Typing 2 provided "great exercise" for beginners and those looking to improve their skills. While she felt it does little to teach children keyboarding, Aycock acknowledged that younger students might be drawn to Mario's popularity and be more likely to find success over other typing programs. Cynthia Sorrels of Kids Domain believed children below six would enjoy the new onscreen keyboard mode while older children would like the regular stages. Despite the technical problems, such as freezing and inaccurate error counting, she wrote that the game was good for children to learn typing.

==== Retrospective ====
Mario Teaches Typing received mixed retrospective reviews in the decades since. Kill Screen's Henry Crouch recalled a negative impression from using it in elementary school, describing it as "lazily constructed" and "no fun". He noted that he could advance by "frantically [mashing] the keyboard," negating the usefulness. While acknowledging that Mario Teaches Typing was not as exciting as the Mario platform games, Brett Alan Weiss of Allgame felt it could "keep most kids entertained for a while". Reviewing the Macintosh version, he praised the learning curve, audiovisuals, and interface, specifically the hand diagram teaching aid. Another Allgame editor, Lisa Karen Saviganno, reviewed the sequel. She described the visuals as well done but "cartoony" and acknowledged that adults would consider them "cheesey". While she believed children would enjoy the audio, Saviganno felt Mario's voice would annoy older players.

In a 2016 IGN retrospective of Mario games on non-Nintendo platforms, Vincent Ingenito praised Mario Teaches Typing for its use of the franchise and being a capable typing tutor. Conversely, Eurogamer's Johnny Chiodini lambasted the game, calling it a "horrible spin-off" and recommending against it. The next year, Innovation & Tech Today's Anthony Elio recommended that players avoid the software citing its ineffectiveness and the frightening Mario head. Writing for NPR in 2021, Brittany Vincent noted that the inclusion of a child-friendly character like Mario in an educational game makes sense now but acknowledged that it was strange at the time. She commented that one of the strange parts was the "creepy" 3D floating Mario head. In 2022, Dalton Norman of Screen Rant praised Interplay for integrating familiar Mario imagery. While he stated that Mario Teaches Typing could never be as exciting as a typical Mario game, the presentation was a "fair approximation of Nintendo's signature style".

== Legacy ==
Following Mario Teaches Typing, Martinet became the official voice actor for Mario, voicing him for decades in over 150 games. Martinet later transitioned from Mario's voice actor to Nintendo's "Mario Ambassador" in 2023. Fargo noted that Miyamoto was happy with Mario Teaches Typing. The success of Mario Teaches Typing encouraged Nintendo to continue releasing educational computer games; it partnered with The Software Toolworks to release the several Mario-themed educational games in 1993. Interplay maintained its relationship with Nintendo, releasing Mario's Game Gallery. However, Nintendo ceased endeavors on non-Nintendo systems, including with Interplay, after another outside company produced a game that was not up to its standards.

== See also ==
- Kewala's Typing Adventure – 1996 typing game aimed at children and adults
- JumpStart Typing – 1997 typing game aimed at children
