= Gordon Bellamy =

American video game executive and LGBTQ advocate

Gordon Patrick Bellamy
- Born: November 9, 1970 (age 56); Washington, D.C., U.S.
- Occupation: Executive Director of the International Game Developers Association
- Spouse: Joe Heally (m. 2014)

Gordon P. Bellamy (born November 9, 1970) is an American video game executive. He has over 19 years of experience and leadership in the interactive entertainment industry. Gordon was the executive director of the International Game Developers Association from August 2010 until July 2012.

== Childhood ==
Bellamy was born in Washington, D.C., and raised in Reston, Virginia. Gordon attended Beauvoir School and Kent Gardens, where he was a member of Shainisville, a 3rd grade class taught by Lara Shainis. Shainisville alumni include Andy Gavin, Gary Shenk, and Sarah Hung Ying. He went on to attend the Johns Hopkins University's Center for Talented Youth and Duke University's Talent Identification Program. In 1984, Gordon was a member of the National Champion Mathcounts Team from Virginia, who won the inaugural competition.

Gordon attended South Lakes High School, Phillips Exeter Academy, the Virginia Governor's Schools Program and St. Paul's School. In 1987, he was chosen to join the prestigious Research Science Institute.

== College ==
Gordon was admitted early and earned a BA degree from Harvard College in engineering, where he was also a John Harvard scholar and an AT&T Bell Labs Engineering scholar. He wrote sports articles for the Harvard Crimson in 1992.

== Games industry ==
Gordon has spent the past 19 years producing and marketing interactive content, and developing strategic business partnerships with video game publishers, social media developers and technology partners.

As an executive consultant for MTV, Bellamy provided creative guidance on the content, direction and strategic marketing partnerships for the annual Spike TV Video Game Awards show and the weekly program GameTrailers TV with Geoff Keighley, also on Spike TV. Previously, he was executive director of the game industry's trade organization, the Academy of Interactive Arts & Sciences. Bellamy has also played key business and product development roles at Electronic Arts, where he was named the company's Rookie of the Year for his work on the Madden NFL franchise, THQ, and Activision subsidiary, Z-AXIS. Gordon previously served as chair of the board of the International Game Developers Association and serves as a judge for the Promax/BDA MI6 Awards, which celebrate the best in marketing, advertising and design within interactive and game entertainment.

In the Netflix documentary miniseries High Score, Bellamy is interviewed in some detail about his role in having Madden NFL '95 reflect that the NFL had a majority of African American players,. including showing Black players Erik Williams and Karl Wilson on the cover, whereas John Madden Football had depicted all the players as white, partly because the technology at the time made it difficult to show ethnically diverse teams in the game. He also talks about race — "For marginalized people, a lot of energy is devoted to justifying your existence in spaces" — and how being gay alienated him from real-world sports, leading him to sports-based video games.

== Personal life ==
Bellamy is gay and married his husband Joe Heally on May 3, 2014, who he had met in 1998 and become engaged to a decade later; they live together in the San Fernando Valley with their dogs and son. Bellamy played soccer for a gay team, the San Francisco Spikes.
