= Mario Golf (GBC video game) =

- North American cover art
- Developer: Camelot Software Planning
- Publisher: Nintendo
- Director: Yasuhiro Taguchi
- Designers: Hiroyuki Takahashi; Shugo Takahashi
- Artists: Mitsuru Fukumoto; Masashi Mikami; Akihito Kimura
- Composer: Motoi Sakuraba
- Series: Mario Golf
- Platform: Game Boy Color
- Release: JP: August 10, 1999; NA: October 5, 1999; EU: October 26, 1999
- Genre: Sports
- Modes: Single-player, multiplayer

Mario Golf (Note: Known in Japan as Mario Golf GB (Japanese: マリオゴルフＧＢ)) is a 1999 sports video game developed by Camelot Software Planning and published by Nintendo for the Game Boy Color. It is a companion to the Nintendo 64 game of the same, and sees players competing in golf on various themed courses. The game features a story mode with role-playing elements where the player selects a character and improves their golfing abilities by winning matches with the goal to eventually compete against Mario.

The game was received positively by critics. A sequel, Mario Golf Advance Tour, would release in 2004.

== Gameplay ==
Mario Golf is a sports video game in which players participate in matches of golf on six themed courses. The game is presented from a top-down perspective, but switches to the third-person when aiming and hitting the ball. There are a total of ten playable characters, with Mario, Luigi, and Wario being the only ones affiliated with the overall Mario series.

The game features a story mode with role-playing mechanics. The story follows one of four different characters as they build up the reputation of their clubhouse by playing against rivals in order to challenge Mario to a match. Initially, the player's stats start off poor, but can be leveled up by winning matches, playing mini-games, and completing challenges. The characters in story mode can be transferred to the Nintendo 64 version of the game through the Transfer Pak peripheral and their statistics can also level up there.

== Reception ==
Reception

Aggregate score
Aggregator	Score
GameRankings	87.65%

Review scores
Publication	Score
AllGame	4.5/5
Computer and Video Games	5/5
Famitsu	30/40
Game Informer	8.75/10
GameSpot	7.2/10
IGN	10/10
Nintendo Life	7/10
Nintendo Power	8.7/10

Upon release, the game garnered a positive reception from critics according to review aggragator website GameRankings. Generally, reviewers found the standard gameplay to be enjoyable and that the story mode was a highlight of the experience.
