= The ClueFinders 5th Grade Adventures: The Secret of the Living Volcano =

1999 video game

- Developer: The Learning Company
- Publisher: The Learning Company
- Platforms: Windows, Macintosh
- Release: 1999
- Genre: Educational/adventure/science fiction/mystery
- Mode: Single-player

The ClueFinders 5th Grade Adventures: Secret of the Living Volcano is a computer game in The Learning Company's ClueFinders series of educational software. In the game, the ClueFinders are shipwrecked on a mysterious volcanic island, inhabited by centuries of trapped castaways, where any escape attempt seems to be deliberately thwarted by natural forces.

== Plot ==
The ClueFinders are on a mission with Captain Clark, Leslie's sailor grandfather, to find out why so many ships have been disappearing in a certain area of the Pacific Ocean. In one of the wrecked ships, Joni and Santiago discover a pair of metal plaques with strange symbols written on them called CrypTiles. When their own ship comes into view of a tiny uncharted island, a tsunami strikes their ship. Joni, Santiago, and LapTrap are stranded on the island and set off to rescue their remaining team members, locate Clark and his crew and find out what sort of activities are happening on the island.

== Gameplay ==
For the majority of the game, the player guides Joni, Santiago and LapTrap in and around the island as they attempt to rescue Owen and Leslie from the underground chamber as well as find a way to escape the adverse island. There are two areas that can be explored at the start of the game, the island itself and the ocean. At the end of the game, the user enters the interior of the island and learns its secrets.

The game has 10 different activities, each with their own skill and goal and divided among four different topics. The first three activities cover Language Arts, followed by four Mathematics activities, two activities on Science and one on Social Studies.

== Reception ==
Reception

Review score
Publication	Score
AllGame	4/5
