= Mario Golf (video game) =

1999 video game

- North American box art
- Developer: Camelot Software Planning
- Publisher: Nintendo
- Director: Haruki Kodera
- Producers: Shinji Hatano; Shigeru Miyamoto; Hiroyuki Takahashi; Shugo Takahashi; Hidetoshi Endo
- Designers: Hiroyuki Takahashi; Shugo Takahashi
- Composer: Motoi Sakuraba
- Series: Mario Golf
- Platform: Nintendo 64
- Release: Nintendo 64: JP: June 11, 1999; NA: July 26, 1999; PAL: September 14, 1999
- Genre: Sports
- Modes: Single-player, multiplayer

Mario Golf (Note: Known in Japan as Mario Golf 64 (Japanese: マリオゴルフ64, Hepburn: Mario Gorufu Rokujūyon)) is a 1999 sports video game developed by Camelot Software Planning and published by Nintendo for the Nintendo 64. It is the successor to NES Open Tournament Golf and, although the first to bear the name, is the second game in the Mario Golf series. Players control Mario series characters participating in the sport of golf on themed courses. Unlike previous golf titles, the gameplay is simplified to provide an easier experience while retaining common elements such as character statistics and variables affecting ball shots. In addition to traditional stroke play, there are other modes such as mini golf and a skins match.

A companion Game Boy Color version of the game featuring a story mode with role-playing elements, also developed by Camelot, was published under the same title worldwide and as Mario Golf GB (Note: Mario Golf GB (Japanese: マリオゴルフＧＢ)) in Japan.

The N64 version was re-released on the Wii and Wii U Virtual Console, and on the Nintendo Classics service, in 2008, 2015, and 2022 respectively.

The game received critical acclaim. A sequel, Mario Golf: Toadstool Tour, was released for the GameCube in 2003.

== Gameplay ==
Mario readying his swing in the ring shot mode. The shot gauge at the bottom of the screen determines how the ball will fly when hit.

Players choose from a variety of characters including Mario, Luigi, Princess Peach, Yoshi, Wario, Donkey Kong, Baby Mario, Metal Mario and five original characters; Plum, Charlie, Sonny, Harry and Maple. Players can then select from a number of courses which have features adapted to the Nintendo world. As a "pick up and play" game, it simplifies the game of golf, without its complicated real-life aspects. Although the game is easy to play and simple in appearance, its engine has many variables that can affect a shot, such as wind strength and direction (indicated by a Boo), rain, characters' individual attributes, spin on the ball, and relief of the land. The variety of gameplay modes include speed golf, ring shot, mini golf, and skins match. Every character in the game has voice samples which can be used to comment on opponents' shots.

The Transfer Pak connects the Nintendo 64 and Game Boy Color versions, to exchange characters and data. A GBC character earns experience points with each round.

== Development ==
Nintendo originally started development on a golf game for the Nintendo 64 tentatively titled Golf. Some time later, they recruited Camelot Software Planning to create a role-playing game, but Camelot wanted to make a simpler game to get accustomed to the Nintendo 64 hardware first. Nintendo was impressed with Camelot's prototype that they canceled their other golf game and assigned Camelot to develop Mario Golf 64. This new golf game was announced in the February 1999 issue of The 64Dream.

== Reception ==
Reception

Aggregate scores
Aggregator	Score	
Aggregator	N64	Wii
GameRankings	87.32%	N/A
Metacritic	91/100	N/A

Review scores
Publication	Score	
Publication	N64	Wii
AllGame	4/5	N/A
Computer and Video Games	4/5	N/A
Electronic Gaming Monthly	8.12/10	N/A
Eurogamer	N/A	9/10
Famitsu	8/10, 8/10, 8/10, 8/10	N/A
Game Informer	9/10	N/A
GamePro	5/5	N/A
GameSpot	8.7/10	N/A
IGN	8.3/10	8/10
Nintendo Life	8/10	N/A
Nintendo Power	8.5/10	N/A
Official Nintendo Magazine	N/A	89%

The Nintendo 64 version received "universal acclaim", according to review aggregator website Metacritic. Reviews of the GBC version aggregated slightly stronger than those of the Nintendo 64 version. IGN called the GBC version "an absolutely brilliant rendition of golf, and a perfect game for the go". In Japan, Famitsu gave both versions a score of 30/40.
