= Mario Golf: Toadstool Tour =

2003 video game

- North American box art
- Developer: Camelot Software Planning
- Publisher: Nintendo
- Director: Haruki Kodera
- Producers: Shinji Hatano; Hiroyuki Takahashi; Shugo Takahashi
- Designers: Hiroyuki Takahashi; Shugo Takahashi
- Programmers: Haruki Kodera; Toru Takamatsu; Kazunori Mimori
- Composer: Motoi Sakuraba
- Series: Mario Golf
- Platform: GameCube
- Release: NA: July 28, 2003; JP: September 5, 2003; AU: February 11, 2004; EU: June 18, 2004
- Genre: Sports
- Modes: Single-player, multiplayer

Mario Golf: Toadstool Tour (Note: known in Japan as Mario Golf: Family Tour (Note: Japanese: マリオゴルフ ファミリーツアー, Hepburn: Mario Gorufu Famirī Tsuā)) is a 2003 sports video game developed by Camelot Software Planning and published by Nintendo for the GameCube. It is the sequel to the 1999 Nintendo 64 title Mario Golf, and is the third game in the Mario Golf series. It was released in North America on July 28, 2003, in Japan on September 5, 2003, and in PAL regions in 2004.

Toadstool Tour is a golf video game featuring characters and elements from the Mario series. There are 16 playable characters in total, each with a set of golfing statistics defining their style of play. The game's main mode involves the player competing in tournaments to obtain new features, although there are alternative modes consisting of a training session and variations to the golf format. This includes "Ring Attack", requiring the player to hit the ball through rings of varying sizes while remaining on or under par. The game also features connectivity with Mario Golf: Advance Tour using the Nintendo GameCube Game Boy Advance cable.

Toadstool Tour received positive reviews upon release. Reviewers praised its visuals, sound, and variety of courses, although a perceived lack of innovation from its predecessor was criticised. The game became part of the Player's Choice label in 2004.

== Gameplay ==
Mario about to hit the golf ball

Toadstool Tour is a golf game incorporating characters, enemies and themes from the Mario series. As a typical golf game, the player's objective is to hit the ball into the hole using as few strokes as possible. Prior to the swing, the player chooses a club, a general direction and range for the ball to travel. During the swing, the player determines power by timing a button press for a marker to stop at the desired point on a power meter. At this point, the player can choose to influence the direction of the ball by applying spin. Players can alternate between auto and manual shots, with the latter providing the player with more control, albeit at a higher risk of a poor shot. Many of these gameplay aspects, such as spin, are affected by the individual statistics of each character. These relate to features such as control of the ball and the general height of the character's shot, which determines how much the character's play is affected by the wind. At varying stages in the "Character match" mode, characters have a chance to be upgraded into "Star characters", which grants statistical enhancements. To achieve this, the player must defeat a computer-designated artificial intelligence (AI) opponent with a character of their choice, awarding the AI character with the upgrade for use later by the player. The opportunities are only available once an envelope appears beside a character portrait in the selection screen.

There are seven courses in the game, with the later versions featuring more complex terrain and exotic features. The more advanced courses offer a higher frequency of difficult terrain and elevation, as in bunkers, which limit the accuracy and range of shots. There are also hazards such as lava pits and thwomps, which will incur a one-shot penalty if landed on. Each course takes its name from a particular Mario feature, such as "Peach's Castle Grounds", which is themed in particular on the Mushroom Kingdom. This course includes themed hazards such as chain chomps in bunkers, as well as warp pipes to change the location of the ball.

Toadstool Tour contains several gameplay modes and variants of golf, as well as the traditional stroke and match play. The player can choose to play the "Doubles" option in several modes, which allows two players to play alternate strokes as a team. "Coin attack" entails collecting several coins scattered on the course, while "Ring attack" requires the player to direct the ball through rings of varying locations, angles, and diameter while keeping on or under par. Some side games incorporate personal training for the player, such as the side games, which develop approaching, putting, shots, and birdie skills (see types of shots). The main mode is "Tournament mode", which involves the player competing against artificial intelligence opponents on each course to win trophies. The game features interactivity with the Game Boy Advance via the GameCube – Game Boy Advance link cable. Players can transfer their player characters from Mario Golf: Advance Tour to Toadstool Tour and gain experience points through gameplay, which can then be transferred back to Advance Tour; players can also unlock bonus characters in Advance Tour based on their progress in Toadstool Tour.

== Development and release ==
Toadstool Tour was developed by Camelot Software Planning, the same team responsible for the game's predecessor, Mario Golf. During an interview with two Camelot developers, Hiroyuki and Shugo Takahashi, it was revealed that the game was developed simultaneously with the GameCube Mario Tennis title, Mario Power Tennis. According to the brothers, ideas and technology used for the development of Toadstool Tour were also used for Power Tennis. The music was composed by Motoi Sakuraba, who previously scored Mario Golf. The game was displayed as a playable demonstration in the E3 convention of 2003. Toadstool Tour became part of the Player's Choice label in 2004, which offers a reduced price to games that have sold more than one million copies.

== Reception ==
Reception

Aggregate score
Aggregator	Score
Metacritic	81/100

Review scores
Publication	Score
Edge	6/10
Electronic Gaming Monthly	7.83/10
Eurogamer	7/10
Game Informer	8/10
GamePro	4.5/5
GameRevolution	B
GameSpot	8.3/10
GameSpy	3/5
GameZone	9/10
IGN	8/10
Nintendo Life	8/10
Nintendo Power	4.2/5
BBC Sport	85%
The Cincinnati Enquirer	4/5

Toadstool Tour received a positive reaction from critics, although it was criticised for being too similar to its predecessor. Eurogamer's Tom Bramwell commented that "Mario Golf hasn't really grown much since its time on the N64", despite enjoying the game's course design and "sense of fun". Both GameSpot and IGN praised the game's courses, although the later stages were preferred to the more basic initial courses. Electronic Gaming Monthly lauded the game's physics evidenced by the use of wind, weather, and surface conditions. The game was often likened to the Tiger Woods PGA Tour games, which served as a criticism when Eurogamer noted the absence of events and player progression in the game's single-player mode. This point was shared by Jennifer Tsao of EGM, who wanted "a more compelling single-player mode" that would offer a "golf pro who coaches me based on my swings".

The game's controls were generally well received, despite specific issues such as difficulties executing very short putts due to the game's power meter. The accessibility of the controls in particular were lauded, although Camelot's choice not to use the analogue swing present in many golf games was a common complaint. This specifically was compared to the analogue system present in Tiger Woods games, prompting Matt Casamassina to comment "going from Tiger Woods back to the mechanics of Mario Golf feels like going from car to horse". The variety of modes available in Toadstool Tour was rated as "amazing" by GameSpot, who proceeded to commend the clarification provided by the game's manual booklet and in-game tutorial. Eurogamer also noted this by offering praise to "Ring attack", but conversely rated "Coin attack" as "a bit shallow". The game's multiplayer offerings were highly regarded by most reviewers.

Many reviewers criticised Toadstool Tour's use of camera, especially when the ball's presented route would ignore obstacles. GameSpot otherwise welcomed the game's visuals, however, arguing that the recurring Mario characters "never looked better". IGN also lauded the graphics present in the full motion video and the rest of the game, as well as Toadstool Tour's audio. Matt Casamassina acknowledged the characters' voiced taunts, saying "the muttering, complaining Waluigi, never fails to bring a smile to our faces".

Alex Trickett of BBC Sport gave it 85% and stated, "If you like pure simulation stick with world number one Tiger Woods, but if you are ready for a wackier round of golf, let your favourite Italian plumber come to the fore." Likewise, Marc Saltzman of The Cincinnati Enquirer gave it four stars out of five and stated that, "One of the game's greatest assets is its intuitive control scheme. Novice and seasoned players will be able to pick up and play with little trouble. There are customizable options for manual or automatic swing modes." However, the only negative review came from Alex Porter of Maxim, who gave it a score of four out of ten, saying, "Golfing game standards like club selection, power meter, and control of backspins and topspins satisfy, but the sometimes-clunky controls and confusing camera perspectives will leave you teed-off." In 2009, Official Nintendo Magazine remarked "Perfect controls, lovely visuals, a classic character roster... what more could you want from a sports game?", placing the game 53rd on a list of greatest Nintendo games.

=== Sales and awards ===
GameSpot named Toadstool Tour the best GameCube game of July 2003.

By July 2006, Toadstool Tour had sold 830,000 copies and earned $26 million in the United States. Next Generation ranked it as the 72nd highest-selling game launched for the PlayStation 2, Xbox or GameCube between January 2000 and July 2006 in that country. Combined sales of Mario sports games released in the 2000s reached 2.5 million units in the United States by July 2006. Toadstool Tour sold 1.03 million units in North America as of December 27, 2007.
