= The ClueFinders Search and Solve Adventures =

2000 video game

- Developer: The Learning Company
- Publisher: The Learning Company
- Platforms: Windows, Macintosh
- Release: 2000
- Genre: Educational/Mystery
- Mode: Single-player

Cluefinders Search and Solve Adventures: The Phantom Amusement Park is an educational computer game in The Learning Company's ClueFinders series that focuses on critical thinking skills. In the game, the ClueFinders must rescue the curator of the local art museum, who has been mysteriously trapped at the top of a drop tower in an abandoned amusement park inhabited by humanoid robots.

This game makes use of limited animation with a great deal of the animation of the ClueFinders being taken from other games, mainly The ClueFinders Reading Adventures. The animation also features several continuity errors. Most notably, LapTrap, after he is damaged, is shown to be immobilized and being carried around by Owen in cut scenes, but LapTrap continues to appear floating in the game screens.

== Plot ==
One night, when the ClueFinders are observing a lunar eclipse from their clubhouse, they see an SOS signal coming from an abandoned amusement park on the edge of town. They find Jacques Ramone, the curator of the local art museum, is trapped at the top of the drop-tower ride. He tells them that he was kidnapped and placed there, but says he doesn't know why. After Joni and Owen rescue the curator, Santiago and Leslie are captured by the curator's sister Mimi Ramone. Joni and Owen investigate the park finding some art supplies and damaged robots, indicated some sort of art forgery crime taking place.

== Reception ==
Reception

Review score
Publication	Score
AllGame	4/5
