= GayBlade =

1992 video game

- Developer: Ryan Best
- Platforms: Microsoft Windows, Mac OS
- Release: 1992
- Genre: Action role-playing game
- Mode: Single-player

GayBlade is an action role-playing video game developed by hobby-programmer Ryan Best and self-distributed by him in 1992. Among the earliest of LGBT-themed video games and long considered lost, a lone copy was found and exhibited at the Schwules Museum (Gay Museum) in Berlin and a recovery effort by multiple parties resulted in a playable emulation in 2020.

== Premise ==
Throughout the game, the player must fight homophobic enemies

The player battles hordes of homophobic enemies, including pastors, police, rednecks, and skinheads as well as other enemies such as giant crab louses in order to rescue Empress Nelda and return her to Castle Gaykeep. The final boss of the game is paleoconservative political commentator Pat Buchanan, the era's most notorious opponent of gay rights.

== Legacy ==
Along with Caper in the Castro (1989), the game is one of the earliest games focusing on LGBT content. As developer Ryan Best was a hobby-programmer and had conceived the game as a form of protest, it never saw an official release. Instead, he gave it away for free to friends and acquaintances, and only few copies existed. The 2020 Netflix documentary series High Score featured Ryan Best and GayBlade in an episode about early RPGs. At the time of production in 2019, Best had lost all copies during a move from Hawaii to San Francisco years before and had been looking for any since then, which he had told the show's producers. As part of their research, the production team searched online, including contacting the LGBTQ Video Game Archive, to seek out footage and copies. During post-production, they heard that a copy of the game had resurfaced during the closing events of Rainbow Arcade, an exhibit at the Schwules Museum (Gay Museum) in Berlin, as was noted briefly in the episode and expanded up in news reports the day of the series' release. Best had thus found a long-lost copy before Rainbow Arcade closed in May 2019 and subsequently worked with an archivist from the Computerspiele Museum (Computer Game Museum) in Berlin, the LGBTQ Video Game Archive, The Strong National Museum of Play, and the Internet Archive to preserve the game and provide the game in both an emulated form and as a downloadable version.

== Bibliography ==
- Jones, Malcolm (May 14, 1993). "GayBlade: The world's first pink fantasy game". Star Observer. Sydney.
- Nissenbaum, Dion (April 4, 1993). "Egads! Empress Nelda has been captured by the forces...". UPI NewsTrack.
- Provenzano, Jim (April 8, 1993). "Dungeons and Drag Queens". Bay Area Reporter. p. 46.
- "Taking a byte out of the bad guys". The Advocate. April 6, 1993. p. 10.
- Vigoda, Arlene (August 3, 1993). "Fun and games". USA Today. p. 1D.
- Clark, Joe (July 13, 1993). "Dungeons and drag queens". The Village Voice. Vol. 38, no. 28. p. 46.
- Cobb, Nathan (August 5, 1993). "Alternative cyberstyles". The Boston Globe. p. 60.
- "Chapter 118: Homosexual Tactics: Anything Goes". Pro-Life Activist's Encyclopedia. American Life League. 1997. Archived from the original on April 15, 2021.
