= The ClueFinders: The Incredible Toy Store Adventure! =

2001 video game

- Developer: The Learning Company
- Publisher: The Learning Company
- Platforms: Windows, Macintosh
- Release: August 24, 2001
- Genre: Educational/adventure/science fiction/mystery
- Mode: Single-player

The ClueFinders: The Incredible Toy Store Adventure is a computer game in The Learning Company's ClueFinders series of educational software.

== Gameplay ==
The ClueFinders: The Incredible Toy Store Adventure! follows two miniaturized team members trapped on a toy store's sixth floor, with players alternating between groups to locate clues and complete eight embedded learning games—most with multiple difficulty levels—covering math, language arts, logic, science, and social studies as part of the story's progression.

== Plot ==
The ClueFinders are heading on a San Francisco cable car to the recently built toy store, Ultimate Toys. Owen goes to retrieve his wallet, along with Joni, and LapTrap, while Leslie, Santiago and AliTrap head into the store, only to be shot by a shrinking ray and captured into a sack. Once they escape from the sack, they realize they've been taken to the sixth floor. Using Owen's red video phone, they contact Leslie and Santiago and inform them of their plight, prompting Leslie and Santiago to try to rescue them. To do this Owen, Joni and LapTrap need to make their way into the toy store and construct a machine to reverse the shrinking effects while nabbing the perpetrator responsible for the shrinking of things in the toy store.

== Reception ==
Reception

Review scores
Publication	Score
All Game Guide	4/5
MacHome Journal	3/5

All Game Guide said "Though not quite perfect, it's an exceptional title in the series and well worth the investment".

MacHome Journal said "A few flaws get in the way of a good game, but if your kids are fans, you won't waste your money".
