= The ClueFinders =

Children's educational software series

- The members of the ClueFinders team from left-to-right: Leslie, Santiago, Owen, LapTrap (above), and Joni.
- Genres: Edutainment, adventure, mystery
- Developer: The Learning Company
- Publishers: The Learning Company (1998–1999); Mattel Interactive under The Learning Company label (1999–2000); The Gores Group under The Learning Company label (2000–2001); Riverdeep/Houghton Mifflin Harcourt under The Learning Company label (2001–2018); Houghton Mifflin Harcourt (2018–present)
- First release: The ClueFinders 3rd Grade Adventures: The Mystery of Mathra; January 1998
- Latest release: The ClueFinders: Mystery Mansion Arcade; 2002

The ClueFinders is an educational software series aimed at children aged 8–12 that features a group of mystery-solving teenagers. The series was created by The Learning Company, as a counterpart to their Reader Rabbit series for elementary-aged students. The series has earned several industry awards.

== History ==
=== The Learning Company (1998–2001) ===
The ClueFinders was conceived as a spiritual successor to the Reader Rabbit series. The first ClueFinders title, The ClueFinders 3rd Grade Adventures: The Mystery of Mathra, was released in January 1998, and The ClueFinders 4th Grade Adventures was released in July. The Learning Company used their new game as the prototype for Internet Applet technology, which allowed users to download supplementary activities from the ClueFinders website. The ClueFinders 4th Grade Adventures was also the first game to include the A.D.A.P.T. technology, which allowed teachers and parents to monitor the player's progress and included auto-adjustable levels based on the player's abilities.

In 1999, The Learning Company was acquired by Mattel for $3.7 billion. The following year, Mattel sold its "The Learning Company" assets to Gores Technology Group. In 2000, Mattel Interactive hired professional writers Jill Gorey and Barbara Herndon to design a concept for a TV series, though the franchise never made its way to television. The ClueFinders Reading Adventures were discontinued in 2000. ClueFinders held a writing competition in 2001. Sponsored by The Learning Company, the competition was open to 3rd-6th-grade classrooms in the United States. The winning essay, a new adventure for the ClueFinders crew, won its writer an iMac.

=== Riverdeep/HMH (2001–2021) ===
In 2001, Riverdeep acquired many of The Learning Company's properties from Gores Technology Group by selling $40 million in stock. Carmen Sandiego, ClueFinders, and Reader Rabbit were then licensed to the KidsEdge website in 2002. In 2003, The ClueFinders' Reading Adventures was reconfigured to run on Windows XP. The 2004 RCN InterACTION service allowed parents to stream games in series such as Carmen Sandiego, Clifford the Big Red Dog, and ClueFinders over a broadband connection. Compilations of multiple previously released titles were added, such as ClueFinders Adventure Pack and ClueFinders Triple Pack. These bundles often include a single ClueFinders title (often "The ClueFinders Reading Adventures") along with other games (but mostly The Learning Company games), such as "Adventure Workshop" or "After School Clubhouse". The 3rd–6th grade titles were re-released on the iOS platform on December 19, 2010. As of 2017, Houghton Mifflin Harcourt (the successor of Riverdeep) has been offering the ClueFinders brand as a licensing opportunity on its website. The software may be downloaded as a bundle of Grades 3-6 that includes Math Adventures and Search and Solve Adventures via the Learning Services website also.

== Plot ==
Development of the games' backstory took 16 months. The ClueFinders adventures take place in the real contemporary world, incorporating some elements of fantasy and science fiction.

The main cast of characters include:

- Joni Savage (Josie Savage in UK version): ClueFinders founder and hard-headed leader.
- Santiago Rivera (Sebastian Robertson in the UK version): A Spanish-American mechanically-minded member.
- Owen Lam: An Asian-American skater dude member.
- Leslie Clark (Lucy Clark in the UK version): An African-American literary-minded member.
- LapTrap, The Turbo T.U.R.T.L.E. (Turbocharged Ultra-Rugged-Terrain Laptop Equipment): A floating artificially intelligent laptop. During The Incredible Toy Store Adventure Laptrap is joined by a second spherical Turbo T.U.R.T.L.E. called AliTrap. The gameplay has him acting as the pause menu.
- Socrates: An intelligent dog who acts as the narrator and mascot. He only appears in The ClueFinders 4th Grade Adventures: Puzzle of the Pyramid.

They were chosen to be around the same age as their player base after the art director ran various character designs by a group of kids. Some of the unsuccessful designs included animals, rock stars, and FBI agents, which the kids perceived as babysitters instead of teammates. Each character was designed with a distinct personality and identifiable faults to increase their relatability. The developers used a character grid to aid their writing, which contained information such as "their flaws, their fears, how they met, where they grew up, and their likely reactions to certain situations".

== Gameplay ==
The series consists of "multi-subject by grade" programs, in which players practice skills and advance their understanding of grade-based content. The player can choose to play the adventure mode or to play the game's activities outside the adventure in "practice mode". Choosing to play the adventure will lead to a follow-up sequence, which further establishes the premise as well as the overall goal of the game. The bulk of each game involves traveling between different screens in a predetermined area that has various educational activities. The user will have to play these games to advance. Usually, each area will have one activity that needs to be completed to advance, which can only be played by collecting items from all the other activities in the area.

In all of the games except for The ClueFinders 4th Grade Adventures, the ClueFinders are split into two teams at the start. A portable red videophone allows the two teams to make contact with each other and clicking on the phone provides the user with game hints from the other team. The other team will typically either be serving as backup, looking for clues, or else be captured and in need of rescue. Games have different activities divided among different areas, each with their skill and goal. The games contain several parodies of and allusions to popular culture and other topics.

In The ClueFinders: Mystery Mansion Arcade, the activities are not as educationally based as the previous games but more arcade-oriented. The mini-games consist of an obstacle course, category matching, a maze game, and a pinball game. In The ClueFinders Math Adventures, the game is set up similarly to Clue in that the central goal of each round is to identify three variables—who stole the treasure, which treasure they took, and where they hid it—based on clues. Clues are acquired from playing games and helping the villagers with their work. Using the acquired clues, the player can limit the number of possibilities until, with enough clues, only one remains. When 24 treasures are restored, the game is won.

== Design ==
=== Graphics and coding ===
During the gameplay, 2D computer graphics are used in the style of hand-drawn animated cartoons with animations that use thick outlines and solid colors on two-dimensional backgrounds. For this reason, the series is often described as imitating the look of a Saturday morning cartoon, Scooby-Doo being repeatedly cited by reviewers. Cutscenes, however, use pre-rendered 3D graphics.

=== Educational goals ===
While Reader Rabbit was popular with younger audiences, The Learning Company came up with ClueFinders to appeal to third graders and onward for both boys and girls. To match with kids' abstract thinking, the games were activity-centered and included cross-curriculum topics more sophisticated than pre-school material, which included algebra, grammar, and spelling. To ensure that users learned something, the educational content came first before the puzzles, game play, and objectives.

== Products in the series ==
=== List of games ===
Games	Platforms and release years
The ClueFinders 3rd Grade Adventures: The Mystery of Mathra (titled The ClueFinders Year 3 / Cluefinders 3 & 4 in UK)	Windows, Mac (1998); Re-released with A.D.A.P.T.; Windows, Mac (1999); Re-released as The ClueFinders: Mystery of the Monkey Kingdom; Windows, Mac (2001); MacOS (2010)
The ClueFinders 4th Grade Adventures: Puzzle of the Pyramid (titled The ClueFinders Year 4 / Cluefinders 4 & 5 in UK)	Windows, Mac (1998); Re-released with A.D.A.P.T.; Windows, Mac (1999); MacOS (2010)
The ClueFinders Math Adventures: Mystery in the Himalayas (titled The ClueFinders Maths Ages 9-12: Mystery of the Stolen Treasures in UK)	Windows, Mac (1998); Re-released with A.D.A.P.T.; Windows, Mac (1999)
The ClueFinders 5th Grade Adventures: The Secret of the Living Volcano (titled The ClueFinders Year 5 / Cluefinders 5 & 6 in UK)	Windows, Mac (1999); MacOS (2010)
The ClueFinders 6th Grade Adventures: The Empire of the Plant People (titled The ClueFinders Year 6 / Cluefinders 6 & 7 in UK)	Windows, Mac (1999); MacOS (2010)
The ClueFinders Reading Adventures: Mystery of the Missing Amulet (titled The ClueFinders Reading Ages 9-12 in UK)	Windows, Mac (1999, included as a bonus disc with other ClueFinders titles)
The Cluefinders Search and Solve Adventures: The Phantom Amusement Park	Windows, Mac (2000)
The ClueFinders Real World Adventure Kit	Windows, Mac (2001, included as a bonus disc with other ClueFinders titles)
The ClueFinders: The Incredible Toy Store Adventure!	Windows, Mac (2001)
The ClueFinders: Mystery Mansion Arcade	Windows, Mac (2002, included as a bonus disc with other ClueFinders titles)
ClueFinders: Doom Elevator	Browser game
ClueFinders: Jungle Adventure	Browser game
ClueFinders: Rescue	Browser game

=== Compilations ===
Title	Year	Games
ClueFinders Adventure Pack	2003	The ClueFinders Search and Solve Adventures: The Phantom Amusement Park; The ClueFinders: The Incredible Toy Store Adventure!; The ClueFinders Reading Adventures: Mystery of the Missing Amulet
ClueFinders Triple Pack	2005	The ClueFinders 3rd Grade Adventures: The Mystery of Mathra; The ClueFinders 4th Grade Adventures: Puzzle of the Pyramid; The ClueFinders 5th Grade Adventures: The Secret of the Living Volcano
Cluefinders Math Learning System	2007	The ClueFinders Math Adventures: Mystery of the Himalayas; Mighty Math Number Heroes

=== Books ===
Two ClueFinders books - The Mystery of Microsneezia and The Mystery of the Backlot Banshee - were both written by Ellen Weiss and illustrated by Mel Friedman.

== Reception ==
Reception

Review scores
Publication	Score
AllGame	4/5
Review Corner	5/5

Awards
Publication	Award
Parents' Choice	Gold Award 1998
Bologna New Media Prize	Best Logical Thinking Program 1999
Review Corner	Award of Excellence

Reception

Review scores
Publication	Score
AllGame	4/5
Game Vortex	80/100
7Wolf Magazine	70/100
macHOME Magazine	3/5

Reception

Review score
Publication	Score
AllGame	4/5

Reception

Review score
Publication	Score
AllGame	4/5

Reception

Review score
Publication	Score
AllGame	4/5

Reception

Review score
Publication	Score
AllGame	3/5

Reception

Review score
Publication	Score
AllGame	4/5

Reception

Review score
Publication	Score
AllGame	4/5

Reception

Review score
Publication	Score
AllGame	4/5

Reception

Review score
Publication	Score
AllGame	4/5

Reception

Review score
Publication	Score
AllGame	3/5

Reception

Review score
Publication	Score
AllGame	4/5

3rd Grade won the 1998 Gold Award from Parents' Choice. During the Opening Day of the Bologna Children's Book Fair on April 8, 1999, the game was awarded the Bologna New Media Prize for the Best Logical Thinking Program.

Reception

Review scores
Publication	Score
AllGame	4/5
Game Vortex	80/100
7Wolf Magazine	70/100
macHOME Magazine	3/5

Computer Shopper and SuperKids described 3rd Grade Adventures as the educational equivalent of the Indiana Jones trilogy. Kiplinger's Personal Finance thought 4th Grade Adventures "works hard for its players' enjoyment". Discovery Education wrote that 5th Grade Adventures "seamlessly combines fun and learning". SuperKids praised the "cartoon quality animation and an alluring storyline" of Math Adventures and the Cluedo-inspired gameplay. 01Net asserted that in terms of 5th Grade Adventures, the activities take precedence over the merely incidental storyline. In 2001, the site described the series' graphics as "very colorful" and "truly seductive" but three years later the site decided they were outdated. Asbury Park Press noted that Reading Adventures, like Carmen Sandiego Word Detective, "placed reading games in the middle of mysteries".

Exploring Values Through Literature, Multimedia, and Literacy Events highlighted the series for its multicultural and balanced cast in which the nonwhite characters have equal status to the white character, noting that Leslie and Santiago are the main sources of knowledge, but also noted that there were no examples of software with the primary character being non-white. Meanwhile, The Boston Herald commented that the series had "come a long way"; the paper suggested that the decision to include a Caucasian (Joni), Asian (Owen), Black (Leslie), and Latino (Santiago) in its main cast smelt of interference from the California School Board standard. The Boston Herald described the series as having 'television-quality animation, broad educational focus, and lively situations', while also noting uneven difficulty in early games. Exploring Values Through Literature, Multimedia, and Literacy Events further praised the series' focus on character interdependence, or how missions are not successful until and unless they work together. Children's Software Review managing editor Ellen Wolock criticized The Learning Company for focusing too much of its resources on repackaging its old software, commenting that she received the impression the company was "just throwing together" entries in its newer ClueFinders series. Working Mother thought the series offered a "painless way for kids to hone their skills". The Cincinnati Enquirer recommended the "strong" series to gamers who were unable to locate the then soon-to-be-discontinued title The Sims: Livin' Large, and said "there is a lot to like" about entries in the series, such as the closed captioning of later titles.

One piece of research used the game as a "tool for assessing how children worked on computers in social interactions and influence acceptance by peers in classroom interactions". The Times Shepperton felt 4th Grade did a "nice job of integrating the learning activities into an engaging adventure". Battle Creek Enquirer and The Tennessean felt 4th Grade's strong sense of mystery encouraged players to learn academia. The Arizona Republic felt Search and Solve would intrigue children due to having the right mix of "scariness and intrigue".

4th Grade received positive reviews. All Game Guide gave the game four out of five stars, writing that "the cut-scenes successfully build excitement, providing an incentive for completing the entire game [though there is no] real reason to play a second time... Gameplay is simple with an easy to use click or click-and-drag mouse control scheme, and the lack of a written manual is overcome with full explanations of all activities within the game...The game seems a delightful mix of adventure and learning". Game Vortex rated the game 80/100, saying that "Clue Finders 4th Grade Adventure: Puzzle of the Pyramid is a typical edutainment game that teaches your child the ins and outs of what he or she needs to know to make it through the fourth grade". 7Wolf Magazine rated the game 70/100.

Reading Adventures gave mixed reviews. Although they said that teacher reviewers were especially impressed with the reading comprehension section", they felt that "too many of the [activities] require fast-twitch gaming ability in addition to knowledge of the subject matter". Of the kids' appeal, the review stated that "the activities themselves, however, are inconsistent. While some are novel and quite educational...others are tired repeats of games seen many times over in many other programs". It concluded by saying that "this likable Clue Finders adventure provides an entertaining way for kids to practice their reading and language skills. Students who need significant help with their reading skills would do better with a more academically oriented title, and those who are not adept gamers may become frustrated with some of the activities".

=== Commercial performance ===
As of 2001, the first six games have sold around 3.5 million copies.

=== Awards and nominations ===
Since its creation in 1998, the ClueFinders series has won over 50 awards and accolades in three years. The Incredible Toy Store was an Edutaining Kids General Learning software pick of 2001.

Year	Award	Recipient	Result
1998	Award of Excellence	The ClueFinders 3rd Grade Adventures: The Mystery of Mathra	Won
1998	Thunderbeam Web site Seal of Approval	The ClueFinders 3rd Grade Adventures: The Mystery of Mathra	Won
1998	Children's Software Revue's All Star Software list	The Cluefinders 3rd Grade Adventures: The Mystery of Mathra	Featured
1998	Parents' Choice Award - Gold Award	The Cluefinders Math Ages 9–12	Won
1998	Parents' Choice Award - Gold Award	The ClueFinders' 3rd Grade Adventures	Won
2002	Parents' Choice Award - Silver Honor	ClueFinders: The Incredible Toy Store Adventure	Won
