= Mario Golf: Advance Tour =

2004 video game

- North American box art
- Developer: Camelot Software Planning
- Publisher: Nintendo
- Director: Yasuhiro Taguchi
- Producers: Shinji Hatano; Hiroyuki Takahashi; Shugo Takahashi
- Designers: Hiroyuki Takahashi; Shugo Takahashi
- Composer: Motoi Sakuraba
- Series: Mario Golf
- Platform: Game Boy Advance
- Release: JP: April 22, 2004; NA: June 21, 2004; AU: July 8, 2004; EU: September 17, 2004
- Genres: Sports, role-playing
- Modes: Single-player, multiplayer

Mario Golf: Advance Tour (Note: Known in Japan as Mario Golf: GBA Tour (Japanese: マリオゴルフ ＧＢＡツアー)) is a 2004 sports role-playing video game developed by Camelot Software Planning and published by Nintendo for the Game Boy Advance. The game is the sequel to the Game Boy Color version of Mario Golf and the Game Boy Advance counterpart of Mario Golf: Toadstool Tour.

The game received positive reviews from critics, with particular praise towards its RPG elements, story mode, gameplay depth, and presentation, but criticism towards a lack of enough innovation and evolution compared to other Mario Golf titles and its plot's lack of depth.

== Gameplay ==
Screenshot of gameplay

The main mode of Advance Tour is its story mode. At the beginning of the game, the player must choose between one of two characters, Neil or Ella, and play as that character for the rest of the game, with the other character as their doubles partner. Neil and Ella have different strengths: Neil has stronger hitting and a slight draw, while Ella has more precise hitting and a slight fade. Using their chosen character, players can explore an overworld map and interact with different courses and objects. On the overworld are the four golfing "clubs" (Marion, Palms, Dunes, and Links) which hold tournaments. The player must play in these tournaments to prove themselves to be an "ultimate golfer", and earn the right to golf with Mario. Each of the clubs has three places of interest: the golf course, the practice area, and the student lodging. The golf course is accessed by entering the tourneys or by playing a practice round. The practice area allows the players to hone their skills by doing various mini-games, as well as play a match against the course leader. Each practice area also features a secret challenge that allows the player to obtain useful items. The student lodging area is only accessible in the Marion course, where Neil and Ella live. One can talk to their doubles partner here, as well as save their game.There are also side courses, as well as the Custom Club Shop, where a metalsmith will make the player special clubs if they give him a Custom Ticket. By progressing through the game and completing its various elements, the player can gain experience to distribute among the two characters to enhance both their drive as well as their hitting capabilities. As a character levels up, they gain stat points to improve their abilities.

In addition to the story mode, Advance Tour features four multiplayer modes. In the "Without Game Link" mode, two to four players take turns playing on one Game Boy Advance. They can choose a player from the unlocked list of players, pick clubs, and then pick a gameplay mode. Other than the previous mentioned features, this is the same as standard free-play mode. In the "With Game Link" mode, each player can select from their own list of characters and clubs, but courses must be mutually unlocked. Otherwise, this is the same as the Without Game Link mode. The Wireless Adapter mode only shows up when the Wireless Adapter is attached to the Game Boy Advance. Otherwise, this is the same as With Game Link mode. In the Club Exchange mode, two players can trade the clubs which they have earned throughout the game via a Game Link Cable or a Wireless Adapter. In the Get Clubs mode, one can receive exclusive Special clubsets (up to 16) from a Wonder Spot using a Wireless Adapter. However, this mode was never used. Neil and Ella can be transferred to Mario Golf: Toadstool Tour for the GameCube using the GameCube – Game Boy Advance link cable, where they can earn experience that will transfer back to Advance Tour. Players can also unlock Luigi, Wario, Waluigi and Bowser as playable characters in Advance Tour by completing certain objectives in Toadstool Tour and connecting the two games.

== Development and release ==
Advance Tour was revealed in late 2003, and created largely by the same team who made Mario Golf: Toadstool Tour. Initially shipped on April 22, 2004 in Japan, the game was also released on June 21, 2004, and September 17, 2004 for North America and Europe respectively. The game also was bundled in Japan with a Wireless Adapter, to go along with the Pokémon releases at the time.

The game was designed by Shugo Takahashi and Hiroyuki Takahashi, and directed by Yasuhiro Taguchi, all of whom have contributed to the Golden Sun series, which had graphical elements that were reused in this game and Mario Tennis: Power Tour.

In 2014, the game was re-released on the Wii U Virtual Console on August (PAL) and September (Japan and North America).

== Reception ==
Reception

Aggregate score
| Aggregator | Score |
|---|---|
| Metacritic | 84/100 |

Review scores
| Publication | Score |
|---|---|
| Edge | 6/10 |
| Electronic Gaming Monthly | 8.67/10 |
| Eurogamer | 8/10 |
| Famitsu | 32/40 |
| Game Informer | 8/10 |
| GamePro | 4.5/5 |
| GameSpot | 8.2/10 |
| GameSpy | 4.5/5 |
| GameZone | 9/10 |
| IGN | 9.5/10 |
| Nintendo Power | 4.4/5 |

Awards
| Publication | Award |
|---|---|
| GameSpy | Editors' Choice |
| IGN | Editors' Choice Award |

Advance Tour received "generally favorable" reviews according to the review aggregation website Metacritic. It received praise for its RPG elements, story mode, gameplay depth, and presentation but criticism towards a lack of enough innovation and evolution compared to other Mario Golf titles and its plot's lack of depth.

IGN hailed Advance Tour as "one of the best golfing games ever", bestowing the game with an Editors' Choice Award, GameSpy said "aside from the quirks in graphics and music, there's almost nothing wrong with Mario Golf: Advance Tour", and Game Informer concluded that in Advance Tour "handheld golf has never been as much fun."

The RPG elements have also been praised, with 1UP saying "[the] simple act of leveling up is addictive in itself" and according to Electronic Gaming Monthly "all the extraneous questing, character building, and item collecting just works."

In 2023, IGN listed the game as the 6th best Game Boy Advance game, considering that "the GBA version took all of the elements of the GameCube game and shrunk them down for play on the portable" while praising its "tons of course designs with tons of cool little hidden tricks that just can't be done on the real-world courses".
