= The ClueFinders 4th Grade Adventures: Puzzle of the Pyramid =

1998 video game

- Developer: The Learning Company
- Publisher: The Learning Company
- Platforms: Windows, Macintosh
- Release: July 13, 1998
- Genre: Educational/Adventure
- Mode: Single-player

The ClueFinders 4th Grade Adventures: Puzzle of the Pyramid is a computer game in The Learning Company's ClueFinders series, where the ClueFinders embark on an Egyptian adventure to save the world from the forces of chaos and Alistair Loveless.

== Plot ==
The ClueFinders are on an adventure in Egypt with Professor Botch, Alistair Loveless, and their dog, Socrates. There, at a dig site, they uncover the tomb of Peribsen, a king from the second dynasty. Joni finds a mysterious ring and tries it on her finger, but it magically latches stuck on to her finger. Later that night, Alistair Loveless and his goons, kidnap Professor Botch and steal several valuable relics. Loveless intentions are to unleash Set, the Egyptian God of Evil and Chaos. The ClueFinders are left to recover the relics, rescue Professor Botch and prevent Loveless and Set from wreaking havoc.

== Gameplay ==
The game has 15 different activities, each with their own skill and goal and divided among five different topics. The first four activities cover Language Arts, followed by five Mathematics activities, two activities on Science, two on Social Studies and finally two on Problem Solving.

== Critical reception ==
Reception

Review scores
Publication	Score
AllGame	4/5 stars
Game Vortex	80/100
7Wolf Magazine	70/100
MacHome	3/5 stars

All Game Guide gave the game four out five stars, generally complimenting graphics, gameplay and controls, and called it "a delightful mix of adventure and learning". Game Vortex rated it 80/100, 7Wolf Magazine rated it 70/100, while MacHome gave it 3 out of 5 stars.
