= Dragon Ball Legends =

2018 video game

- Developer: Dimps
- Publisher: Bandai Namco Entertainment
- Producers: Tani, Toshi
- Series: Dragon Ball
- Platforms: Android iOS iPadOS
- Release: JP: May 24, 2018; (Android): WW: May 31, 2018
- Genre: Fighting
- Modes: Single-player; Multiplayer

Dragon Ball Legends (Japanese: ドラゴンボール レジェンズ) is a free-to-play mobile game based on the Dragon Ball anime franchise. Developed by Dimps and published by Bandai Namco Entertainment, it was released in Japan for Android on May 24, 2018, and for iOS on May 31, 2018.

== Gameplay ==
Legends includes elements of fighting and strategic card battling games. The player can control the characters by tapping the touch screen to make them attack and swiping it to move around the 3D environment. During the fights, players can use up to 3 characters, each of them has an element and depending on the opponent's element, their attacks can do more or less damage.

Cards are automatically drawn from a deck, these allow to unleash combos of melee, ranged and special attacks. The amount of cards you get are dependent on your card draw speed, which affects how much cards you will get. Certain cards used by the player grant them Dragon Balls. After getting 7 of these, the player unlocks the "Rising Rush" for their characters. This allows the character to unleash a super attack that is much more powerful than the typical combo attacks.

Legends also has a gacha system allowing players to collect specific characters from the Dragon Ball series, although not from the yet-to-be-animated manga, there are 5 rarities and a sub-rarity; these are HERO, being the weakest and most common, EXTREME, being less common than HERO units, but still weak in gameplay; SPARKING, which are powerful but often overshadowed by LEGENDS LIMITED characters, as the latter rarity has units with better stats and have special finishing moves ("Legendary Finishes") if the player uses a specific attack to end the fight. Lastly are ULTRA characters which are the strongest characters, upon initial release, and tend to be meta-shattering. In order to collect these characters, one must summon them from their specified "banner." ULTRA characters can only be summoned on their specified banner, at a 0.350% drop rate, compared to LEGENDS LIMITED and LEGEND units which commonly have a 0.500% drop rate.

On February 11, 2026, a new rarity titled LEGEND was introduced to the game. LEGEND was revealed four days prior at the "WORLD CHAMPIONSHIP 2025-2026" event, with the first of this rarity being Super Vegito. This was introduced to replace the LEGEND LIMITED rarity. LEGEND characters still have the same pull rates as their predecessor being 0.500%. The developers made this decision because the LEGENDS LIMITED rarity is still a form of the SPARKING rarity and they wanted to differentiate the two. Despite the fact that the LEGENDS LIMTED rarity is now discontinued, they are still present in the game and can be obtained via summons as a separate rarity.

There are currently 31 ULTRA characters in the game, the first three being Super Saiyan Goku from the "Frieza Saga" of Dragon Ball Z, Vegeta from the "Namek saga" of Dragon Ball Z, and Omega Shenron from the "Shadow Dragon Saga" of Dragon Ball GT - but these three are not summonable and must instead be obtained by completing their respective events. The first summonable ULTRA was ULTRA Super Gogeta for the Legends Festival 2021 event.

== Game storyline ==
The main story is an episodic single-player campaign divided into over 19 parts, the 19th part is the (currently ongoing) final part of the story. The story consisting of numerous books and chapters, created by Akira Toriyama. Players progress through the in-story "Tournament of Time" event, earning rewards like Chrono Crystals (the main in-game currency) and experience points for completing stages. The difficulty scales as the narrative advances, frequently introducing challenge missions that require specific battle feats to earn extra items.

Key story segments often features fixed character battles, forcing players to use Shallot (Japanese: シャロット, Hepburn: Sharotto) or specific allies to match the plot's events. These stages are occasionally punctuated by cinematic boss battles with mid fight dialogue and unique triggers, such as special cutscenes. Between major combat milestones, the game uses dialogue heavy chapters to advance the mystery of the Mastermind and the converging timelines.

Shallot is the main protagonist of the story, Voiced by Alejandro Saab in the English version. Shallot was introduced in the being of the story line in Part 1 Book 1. Giblet (Japanese: ジブレット Jiburetto) is also known as "Saiyan in Red"/ "Hooded Man", Voiced by Micah Solusod in the English version of the game. He was first Introduced in May 2018, in Part 1 Book 7 of the story line in the game. He is revealed to be the twin brother of Shallot. These two are part of the game original characters originated within the game.

Zahha (Japanese: ザッハ Zah-ha) is the main antagonist of the story. In its early stages he was portrayed as Shallot's friend, but betrayed him and the other heroes in Part 9, revealing he hates Shallot and manipulated him and Giblet to further his goals.

== Development and release ==
Legends was announced during the Google Game Developers Conference in March 2018. The game was released on May 24, 2018, in Japan, and released worldwide on May 31, 2018.

== Reception ==
Reception

Aggregate score
| Aggregator | Score |
|---|---|
| Metacritic | 69/100 |

Review score
| Publication | Score |
|---|---|
| Jeuxvideo.com | 16/20 |

The game reached 4.5 million pre-registered users worldwide, the highest for Bandai Namco Entertainment. By August 2021, the game had more than 50 million registered users. Legends received the award for best game of 2018 at the Google Play "Best of 2018" awards ceremony. By April 2024, the game surpassed 100 million registered users.

A month after its launch, the game grossed $40 million, reaching number 3 on the Japanese App Store. By February 2019, it grossed more than $140 million worldwide.

On February 7, 2026, during the "WORLD CHAMPIONSHIP 2025-2026" event, Dragon Ball Legends also achieved a Guinness World Record for the most playable characters in a video game, with the count at the time being 676 playable characters. The list continues to grow with every new unit release and will most likely continue to grow with the Dragon Ball Super: The Galactic Patrol anime, which is expected to release in 2027 or 2028.

== Competitve Meta And Game Balance ==
Competitive PvP is one of the key elements of Dragon Ball Legends. Through the entire history of the game, its meta – the term for the competitive scene in video games – has changed greatly due to new characters and balance changes. Some combinations of characters and mechanics became dominant in high-level play and caused significant balance changes.

One of the most frequently seen and common team composition strategies used low-risk and high-reward moves that reduced tactical complexities. It was easy for players to combo and dish out heavy amounts of damage without the risk of being countered. Some examples of such team compositions include:

"Holy Trinity" (Late 2018): Team build made up of Sparking Super Saiyan Bardock (BLU, DBL07-04S),Sparking Super Gogeta (RED, DBL05-10S), and Sparking Transforming Super Saiyan Broly (PUR, DBL07-07S) featured in movie "Dragon Ball Super: Broly". The trio was hard to beat because of the supportive nature of Bardock with his passive buffs and crits, utility skills and skill counters of Gogeta, and the extremely powerful damage output of Transforming Broly after he transforms. Moreover, Transforming Broly was unique back then because it was the only card which had an Ultimate Skill after transformation.

"Zenkai Awakening Era" (September 2020 – Late 2021):The recently added units during this era were mostly outshone by previously existing units enhanced with the "Zenkai Awakening" upgrade system. The most prominent units in this competitive meta were Legends Limited Super Saiyan 2 Gohan (RED, DBL10-06S) or "FSK Gohan," who stayed the best unit of the game due to higher statistics and convenient "Last Standing" passive abilities. Upon losing any ally teammate, he would receive permanent 40% damage increase and 30% Ki recovery buffs; if the losing character was from the "Son Family" tag, FSK Gohan received permanent 100% damage boost for his Ultimate Move, ensuring one-shot kills against enemies. This meta was brought to an end and ended by the first summonable Ultra, Ultra Super Gogeta (DBL42-01U), this unit had 2 Ultimate,prevents enemy to switch into another character twice for 5 timer counts which guaranteed to kill a unit like FSK.

''Ultra Super Gogeta Era" (Late 2021 – Mid 2022): After being released, Ultra Super Gogeta (BLU, DBL42-01U) dominated the central character role in competitive play. His deck consisted of defensive and offensive abilities that were not strict on the player: in case an ally was KO'd, changing to Gogeta would automatically give an Ultimate Move card and prevent the opponent from switching characters for five timer counts. Moreover, his Attack-Type Unique Gauge ability would automatically draw Special Move cards and make elemental type disadvantages ineffective for a limited time. However, power creep in mid-2022 caused him to lose his dominance before the 4th anniversary of the game.

"The Passive Play and MUI Goku Era" (Mid 2022 – Late 2022): Launched during the 4th Anniversary, Legends Limited Mastered Ultra Instinct Goku (RED, DBL47-01S) came with a feature called Evade Type Unique Gauge which allowed the unit to auto-dodge incoming strike and blast attacks and simultaneously hit back with massive damage. The unit could auto-win Dokabaki Impacts, had Ultimate Move which could break through 100% Damage Guard and nulified blast cards while performing forward charges. This dependence on auto-counters contributed to the emergence of passive gameplay until the end of 2022 when the release of Legends Limited Beast Gohan (BLU, DBL52-01S) changed the meta.

"The Gohan Ball Legends Era" (Early 2024 – Late 2024): This era was marked by the introduction of Ultra Super Saiyan 2 Gohan (GRN, DBL68-03U), the kit of which resulted in extensive community conversations, where people jokingly called the game "Gohan Ball Legends." This unit came with very lenient defensive stats, such as an automatic Strike Card counter gauge and a Special Move card that could defend against practically any type of enemy attack, from Strike to Blast, Special Skill, Special Move, Ultimate Move, and Rising Rush moves. Furthermore, Gohan used the stacking of "Damage Inflicted" buffs throughout enemy combo attacks to deal considerable damage. To this day after more than 2 years of release he still does damage despite having a powercrept stats.

"The Era of the Long Combos" (Late 2024 – Early 2025): Character-based era where characters had the ability to form unlimited attack strings, thus making it very difficult for opponents to have counter-attack opportunities. Popular characters during this era were the Legends Limited Transforming Super Saiyan God Super Saiyan Vegito (GRN, DBL77-03S) and Legends Limited Transforming Super Saiyan 3 Goku (GRN, DBL78-02S). Both these characters had passive skills, and as soon as the player used cards from these characters, the game would automatically pull out new Arts cards. In order to address community feedback about long combos, certain balance changes were brought in.

"The Majin Vegeta Era" (Late 2024 – Mid 2025): Characterized by the debut of Ultra Majin Vegeta (YEL, DBL76-04U), whose disruptive gameplay kit made him dominant in PvP matches as he was mostly offensive. The character came equipped with auto Blast Card counter gauge ability, endurance regeneration ability that killed off any enemy card upon use, as well as character lock function when Ultimate Move was used. This character's dominance influenced players to build special teams that were specifically meant to counter its gameplay abilities. Most notable of these counters was the infamous "UMV Mass Countering" which happened on January 31st, 2025 and was spearheaded by former Dragon Ball Legends Youtuber Slackax and members of his community.

"Gohan Ball Legends" Comeback (End 2025 – End 2026): Characterized by the arrival of Legends Limited Super Saiyan 2 Gohan (BLU, DBL90-02S), whose special feature was a revive system that healed the character on being defeated the first time. This character had a good offensive capacity along with the AOE Special Skill card, which could stop the enemies and allow a guaranteed combo attack. Additionally, the unit's Legendary Finish animation received widespread praise from the game's player base.

"Sagas From the Movies" Dominance (August 2026 - October 2026): This is a team build created from synergy of the characters from the movies of the Dragon Ball series. The first character used in this team build is Legend Multi-Transforming Broly (GRN, DBL95-02L) whose origin is from "Dragon Ball Super: Broly". This character is well-known because of the fact that he is capable of countering automatic strikes and blasts as well as transforming to Super Saiyan and Legendary Super Saiyan. This character is accompanied by another character by the name of Ultra Final Form Cooler (YEL, DBL98-03U). This is an offensive character which has automatic Dokabaki Impact Wins, Rising Rush defeat negation and endurance negation through Unique Gauge. The last character in the team build is Legend Revival Goku (BLU, DBL99-01L) who is an offensive as well as a defensive character.

"Ultra Super Gogeta" Comeback (Present): With the awakening of these character's already established platinum equipment which was initially released on December 18th, 2024, Ultra Super Gogeta (BLU, DBL42-01U) yet again rose to competitive dominance. This character's most notable improvements are double card draw speed and 10 timer counts of element neutral on special move activation. Its best team is Mono-BLU, which consists of Ultra Super Gogeta (BLU, DBL42-01U), Legend Revival Goku (BLU, DBL99-01L), and Ultra Super Saiyan 3 & Super Saiyan 2 Goku & Vegeta (BLU, DBL97-01U).
