= The ClueFinders Math Adventures =

- Developer: The Learning Company
- Publisher: The Learning Company
- Platforms: Windows, Macintosh
- Release: NA: September 22, 1998; EU: November 2, 2001
- Genre: Educational/Mystery
- Mode: Single-player

The ClueFinders Math Adventures Ages 9–12: Mystery in the Himalayas is a computer game in The Learning Company's ClueFinders series, where the ClueFinders try to recover stolen treasures in a small Himalayan village.

== Plot ==
In a village high in the Himalayas, twenty-four priceless treasures have been stolen. An elder of the village calls the ClueFinders to help uncover the treasures and the thief's identity. Many, including the elder's pessimistic apprentice, believe the Yeti is behind the theft, but the clues all point in different directions and it appears a different person is responsible for the theft of each item.

== Gameplay ==
The game is set up similar to Clue in that the central goal of each round is to identify three variables - who stole the treasure, which treasure they stole and where they hid it - based on clues. Clues are acquired from playing games and helping the villagers with their work. Once the user has enough clues he/she can limit down the number of possibilities until only one remains. When twenty-four treasures are restored, the game is won.

The game has nine different activities, purely focused on the subject of Mathematics including Arithmetic, Decimals, Fractions, Geometrics, Graphs and Logic.

== Reception ==
Reception

Review score
Publication	Score
AllGame	4/5

A review by gracepub for ReviewStream.com was generally positive. The review noted that the game was developed cleverly, and stated that the children can solve the math concepts without the parent's help when playing the game. The game was given a rating of 9 out of 10.
