= The ClueFinders 3rd Grade Adventures: The Mystery of Mathra =

- Developer: The Learning Company
- Publisher: The Learning Company
- Platforms: Windows, Macintosh
- Release: January 1998
- Genre: Educational/Adventure/Mystery
- Mode: Single-player

The ClueFinders 3rd Grade Adventures: The Mystery of Mathra is a computer game in The Learning Company's ClueFinders series where the ClueFinders save the Numerian rainforest and Dr. Horace Pythagoras from a mysterious monster called Mathra. The game was re-released as The ClueFinders: Mystery of the Monkey Kingdom in 2001.

The game is the first in the series and depicts the first meeting of the ClueFinders and LapTrap, who goes on to appear in all the other ClueFinders games. The game ends with LapTrap being given to the ClueFinders and, in this respect, The Mystery of Mathra can be seen as an origin story for the rest of the series.

== Plot ==
A great city was built over 1000 years ago in the Numerian rainforest somewhere in South America, until a dragon-like monster named Mathra invaded. After Mathra was captured, the Numerians abandoned their city and sealed the entrance and hid the two halves of the key in the far corners of the rainforest - one in the Monkey Kingdom and one in the Goo Lagoon. Recently, animals have started to disappear in the rainforest once again, along with Joni's uncle Dr. Pythagoras. Mr. Limburger flies the ClueFinders in his airplane and briefs them on the events going on. The ClueFinders set off to find the lost doctor, animals and the keys to the Lost Numerian City. Evidence that they find, however suggests that there is more to those disappearances than the 1000 year old monster as well as a sinister plot behind it.

== Gameplay ==
The game has 22 different activities divided among four different areas of the rainforest, each with their own skill and goal. The first seven activities cover Mathematics, followed by seven Logic activities, two activities on Geography, four on Science and finally two on Language Arts. The game contains a number of parodies of and allusions to popular culture and other topics.

== Critical reception ==
Reception

Review scores
Publication	Score
AllGame	4/5
Review Corner	5/5

Awards
Publication	Award
Parents' Choice	Gold Award 1998
Bologna New Media Prize	Best Logical Thinking Program 1999
Review Corner	Award of Excellence

The game won the 1998 Gold Award from Parents' Choice. During the Opening Day of the Bologna Children's Book Fair on Thursday, April 8, 1999, the game was awarded the Bologna New Media Prize for the Best Logical Thinking Program.
