= Wario =

Video game character

- Mario character
- Art from the Super Mario Bros. Encyclopedia (2015) by Shigehisa Nakaue
- First game: Super Mario Land 2: 6 Golden Coins (1992)
- Designed by: Hiroji Kiyotake
- Voiced by: Chikao Ōtsuka (Japanese, 1992–2008, commercials, Excitebike: Bun Bun Mario Battle Stadium; via Satellaview broadcast only); James H. Sawyer Sr. (1992–1995, commercials); Charles Martinet (1993–2023); Stevie Coyle (1993, 1997–1998; Mario in Real Time, E3 puppet); Mayumi Tanaka (Mario Kirby Masterpiece Video); Dale Johannes (1996, E3 puppet); Thomas Spindler (1996–2001) (Note: Mario Kart 64 Japanese edition, Excitebike: Bun Bun Battle Stadium in-game, Mario Party, Mario Party 2, Mario Party 3 and Mario Kart: Super Circuit); Hironori Kondo (Japanese, 2018–present; WarioWare series only); Kevin Afghani (2023–present)

Wario (English: /ˈwɑːrioʊ, ˈwær-, ˈwɒr-/ ) (Note: Japanese: ワリオ, Hepburn: Wario) is a character in Nintendo's Mario franchise who was designed as an antithesis of Mario. Wario first appeared as the main antagonist and final boss in the 1992 Game Boy game Super Mario Land 2: 6 Golden Coins. His name is a portmanteau of the name Mario and the Japanese word warui (悪い), meaning "bad". He is usually portrayed as a selfish and greedy treasure hunter who, in karmic irony, routinely loses his spoils by an adventure's end. Hiroji Kiyotake designed Wario, and Charles Martinet voiced the character from 1993 to 2023.

Wario is also the main protagonist and antihero of the Wario Land platformer series and the WarioWare party game series. He makes regular appearances as a playable character in Mario spin-offs and other video game series, including Mario Sports games, Mario Kart, and Mario Party, in which he is typically paired with the character Waluigi to form a comedy duo that rivals the partnership of Mario and his brother, Luigi. Wario has also been featured in several entries of the fighting game series Super Smash Bros..

== Concept and creation ==
The emblem on Wario's hat, which in most appearances has the letter W extend outside of the white circle

The character Foreman Spike, a possible inspiration for Wario, first appeared in the 1985 game Wrecking Crew. Spike is a construction foreman who bears a slight resemblance to Wario. Game artist Hiroji Kiyotake designed Foreman Spike, whom Kiyotake imagined as "the Bluto to Mario's Popeye". Wario's first named appearance occurred in the 1992 game Super Mario Land 2: 6 Golden Coins. Wario's design arose from Super Mario Land's design team's distaste for making a game based around someone else's character. The creation of Wario allowed them their own character to "symbolize their situation".

Wario was designed to be a malevolent-looking caricature of Mario: he has a large head and cleft chin; thickly muscular arms; a wide, short, slightly obese body; short legs; a large, pointy, zig-zagging mustache with similarly-textured hair; a pointed nose and ears; light blue bags around his eyes; and a bellicose cackle. He wears a plumber outfit with a yellow-and-purple color scheme, which is a short-sleeved yellow shirt, purple overalls, and an indigo "W" on his hat. He also wears green pointed shoes and white gloves with indigo "W" symbols. In his early appearances, Wario wears a yellow, long-sleeved shirt and fuchsia overalls. His exact humanoid species is unclear. The name "Wario" is a portmanteau of "Mario" and the Japanese adjective warui (悪い), meaning "bad", hence "bad Mario", which is also symbolized by the "W" on his hat (an upside-down "M"). Wario was planned to be a temporary name, but it proved popular with the staff. Waluigi was created to be the tennis partner of Wario in Mario Tennis, and early material from Nintendo of Europe portrayed them as brothers, but their relationship has since been ambiguous. When asked whether Wario was a brother to Waluigi in 2008, voice actor Charles Martinet stated that while he did not know, he felt that they were just "two nice, evil guys who found each other".

Nintendo originally considered making Wario a German character before he developed into an Italian like Mario. Wario was intended to be German at one point; German translator Thomas Spindler gave him German lines when he was brought on to voice Wario. This part of Wario was eventually dropped; Martinet's Wario voice did not have any German influence. During his audition for the part, Martinet was told to speak in a mean-and gruff-sounding tone; he said voicing Wario is a looser task than voicing Mario, whose speaking manner and personality are freer-flowing, rising from the ground and floating into the air, while jealousy is one of Wario's characteristics.

Wario is often portrayed as a villain in video games in which he makes a cameo appearance. The development team for Wario Land: Shake It! stated he was not really a villain, and they did not consider him one during development. They focused on his behavior, which alternates between good and evil. Etsunobu Ebisu and Takahiro Harada, producers of Shake It!, considered Wario to be a reckless character who uses his strength to overwhelm others. Tadanori Tsukawaki, Shake It!'s design director, described Wario as manly and said he was "so uncool that he ends up being extremely cool." Because of this, Tsukawaki wanted Wario to act macho rather than silly and asked the art designers to emphasize his masculinity. During an interview with Kikizo, video game designer Yoshio Sakamoto, who was a member of R&D1 since its early days, stated the project centered around Wario because the team "couldn't think of anyone else best for the role", and he was then described as "unintelligent" and "always idiotic", which is the reason he was chosen as the star of the WarioWare series. According to an early 1990s Nintendo guide, Wario was Mario's childhood friend, which Kotaku later contested in a parody article. Afterward, it was stated that they were not related to each other and were considered childhood rivals.

In his earliest appearances in Super Mario Land 2: 6 Golden Coins and Wario's Woods, Wario displays considerable magical power, using spells on the population of islands to turn them into his minions, create duplicates, and grow very large. These traits were discontinued starting with Wario Land: Super Mario Land 3, in which he is rejuvenated by garlic in a similar manner to Mario being powered by mushrooms. In the WarioWare series, he becomes a smelly slob, while in Mario Strikers: Battle League, his super shot special involves smashing his butt into the ball, followed by him devouring a giant clove of garlic. In WarioWare: Touched!, consuming garlic transforms Wario into "Wario-Man", a superhero with powers relating to garlic-induced flatulence and bad breath. In other games, he uses farts as his special attack. Wario prominently uses bombs as tools and weapons in the WarioWare series as a visual motif to represent the time limit of a microgame.

Following the debut of The Super Mario Galaxy Movie (2026), director Shigeru Miyamoto advised actors like Chris Pratt, who portrays Mario in the movies, to avoid making "crude jokes". However, he stated that it doesn't mean Wario, whose appearances in his own games like WarioWare and other Nintendo games like Super Smash Bros. typically feature some sort of bodily function "humor," won't appear in the films.

== Appearances ==
=== Wario Land series ===
Wario first appeared as a villain in the 1992 Game Boy video game Super Mario Land 2: 6 Golden Coins, in which he captures Mario's castle. Tatanga, the villain of the first Super Mario Land game, is a henchman of Wario in the second, implying Wario is responsible for the events of both games. Wario also serves as a villain in the 1993 Japan-only puzzle game Mario & Wario, in which Wario drops a bucket on the heads of Mario, Princess Peach, or Yoshi. This was followed by the first game in the Wario Land series, Wario Land: Super Mario Land 3 (1994), a platform game that marks Wario's first appearance as a protagonist and introduced his first villains, Captain Syrup and her Brown Sugar Pirates. In his next appearance in Virtual Boy Wario Land (1995), Wario plays similarly and has the ability to move in and out of the background. A sequel to the Game Boy game Wario Land II (1998) features Captain Syrup's return as the antagonist. This game introduces Wario's invulnerability, allowing him to be burned or flattened without sustaining damage.

In 2000, Wario Land 3 was released for the Game Boy Color; it is another sequel that uses the same mechanics and concepts as its predecessor. The following year, the sequel Wario Land 4 (2001) debuted on the Game Boy Advance and incorporates Wario's ability to become burned or flattened and reintroduces the ability to become damaged from standard attacks. In 2003, Wario World, the first console Wario platform game, was released for the GameCube. It has three-dimensional graphics and gameplay and does not incorporate major elements from previous platform games. Wario: Master of Disguise (2007) for the Nintendo DS introduces touch-screen control of Wario and incorporates puzzles into the gameplay. The series' most recent release, Wario Land: Shake It! (2008) for the Wii, reintroduces Captain Syrup. The game uses a hand-drawn animation style; Wario's design required more than 2,000 frames of animation.

=== WarioWare series ===
Wario has a redesign by Ko Takeuchi in the WarioWare series, depicting him as a biker, such as in this promotional artwork for WarioWare Gold.

In 2003, the Wario franchise introduced a new series of games, the first of which was WarioWare, Inc.: Mega Microgames! for the Game Boy Advance. The game's premise involved Wario's decision to open a game development company to make money, creating short "microgames" instead of full-fledged games. The game's gameplay focused on playing a collection of microgames in quick succession. Mega Microgames! was later remade as WarioWare, Inc.: Mega Party Games! (2003) for the GameCube; it featured the same microgames but lacked a story mode and focused more on multi-player. In 2004, two sequels were released for the game. The first was the Game Boy Advance game WarioWare: Twisted!, which used the cartridge's tilt sensor to allow microgames to be controlled by tilting the handheld left and right. The second was the Nintendo DS release WarioWare: Touched!, which incorporates the DS's touch screen and microphone into its gameplay.

One of the Wii's launch games in 2006 was WarioWare: Smooth Moves, which used the Wii Remote's motion-sensing technologies in a variety of ways. The Nintendo DS and Nintendo DSi have offered two new releases: 2008's WarioWare: Snapped!, which can be downloaded with the DSiWare service and uses the DSi's built-in front camera in its gameplay, and 2009's WarioWare D.I.Y., which allows players to create microgames. Game & Wario for the Nintendo Wii U was released on June 23, 2013. Although it does not use the WarioWare name, it incorporates gameplay and characters from the WarioWare series. The game also pays tribute to the original Game & Watch games. In 2018, the Nintendo 3DS game WarioWare Gold was released, featuring 316 microgames and combining elements from Twisted and Touched. He also appeared in the 2021 Nintendo Switch game WarioWare: Get It Together! and the 2023 Nintendo Switch game WarioWare: Move It!, with 223 microgames.

=== Other video games ===
In Wario's Woods, Wario is the main antagonist who wants to take over the forest and is defeated by Toad. The same year, Wario appeared in the video game Wario Blast: Featuring Bomberman! (1994), a remake of a Bomberman game for the Game Boy that includes Wario as a playable character. Wario is a playable character in the Mario Kart series, starting with Mario Kart 64 (1996). Wario has appeared in Mario sports games, including Mario Golf, Mario Tennis, Mario Baseball, Super Mario Strikers, and the Mario & Sonic series. Wario has also appeared in all installments of the Mario Party series, except Mario Party Advance (2005).

Wario is a playable character in two platform games for the Nintendo DS: the remake Super Mario 64 DS (2004) and Yoshi's Island DS (2006) as an infant version of himself, and the puzzle game Dr. Mario 64 (2001). He is also a playable character in the fighting game series Super Smash Bros. and has appeared in every game since being introduced in Super Smash Bros. Brawl (2008). He then reappears in Super Smash Bros. for Nintendo 3DS and Wii U (2014) and Super Smash Bros. Ultimate (2018). Wario's cameos include in Mario's Super Picross (1995), Pilotwings 64 (1996), Densetsu no Starfy 3 (2004), and Dr. Mario World (2019).

=== Other media ===
The 1992 graphic novel Super Mario Adventures, which is a collection of comics originally serialized in the video-gaming magazine Nintendo Power, features Wario in two of the stories, one of which focuses on Wario's past and explains his rivalry with Mario.

Wario appears in South Park's "Imaginationland Episode III" (2007) as one of the characters from the "dark side" of Imaginationland. In 2010, Charles Martinet's Wario voice was used in an advertisement promoting WarioWare D.I.Y. for British supermarket chain Tesco. In a May 2021 episode of Saturday Night Live, host Elon Musk starred as Wario in a sketch in which he was put on trial for murdering Mario in a kart race. In February 2024, Homer Simpson portrayed Wario in an episode of The Simpsons, "Lisa Gets an F1". Wario has also received several of his own Amiibo, which can be used in a wide array of games, including his own.

== Reception ==
Since his appearance in Wario Land: Super Mario Land 3, Wario has received a largely positive and liked reception and has become a well-established mascot for Nintendo. Several gaming publications described Wario as one of the best video game villains. Computer and Video Games found the levity of Wario games "liberating" compared to big Nintendo franchises such as Mario and The Legend of Zelda. The writer could "empathise more with the hopelessly materialistic Wario than goody brown-shoes Mario" and added that "Deep down, we'd all rather chase pounds over princesses." IGN editor Travis Fahs said that while Wario is not the most likeable character, his strong confidence overshadows his flaws and makes him entertaining. Audrey Drake of IGN said of Wario, "[A]ll this weird dude seems to care about is amassing as many material possessions and shiny things as possible",

KhalidEternalNigh of Destructoid praised the character, describing him as "fat, lazy, greedy, and a cheater" and said: "[D]espite all of this I can't help but love him. Wario is, in my humble opinion, the most perfect 'evil twin' in the history of video games. [...] During Wario's career he has worn many hats – a game designer, a biker, a treasure hunter, and a hat that spits fire for some reason. Yet no matter what he does, no matter how mean he is, somehow Wario manages to charm his way into our hearts while picking our pockets." Ryan Gilliam of Polygon described Wario as the "ultimate Italian American" and said the character "captures so much more of the Italian personality that resonates with me." He also said, "Wario trumps Mario as my family mascot, born with a crucial, relatable need to be louder and larger than life." According to Mike Sholars of Kotaku, "Wario Isn't Evil, He's Honest". Sholars concluded, "Wario was conceived out of a desire to put a twist on the familiar, but his creators tapped into a powerful, universal constant: The Unrepentant Asshole." Edwin Evans of Eurogamer praised Wario for being "repulsive" and "brilliant" and said, "In general, Wario isn't the star he used to be, [...] [b]ut he remains a crucial component of the Nintendo pantheon, the counterbalancing touch of malevolence and cunning without which Mario's star wouldn't shine quite so brightly." William Hughes of The A.V. Club described him as "Nintendo's stinky, cheating genius" and said the character "captures the split at the heart of Nintendo. [...] All we know if that Wario would have loved the possibilities the smash hit console presents, and that the absence of a new WarioWare game on the handheld remains a real shame to the legacy of all the things—good, bad, flatulent, weird, and more—that he means to the company", while Cass Marshall of Polygon said he "was institutionalized as a teen, and Wario was my only friend", and that he "find[s] Wario kind of soothing. He's just got a friendly face."

In the book A Parent's Guide to Nintendo Games: A Comprehensive Look at the Systems and the Games, Craig Wessel described Wario as a "sinister twist" on Mario. In Icons of Horror and the Supernatural: An Encyclopedia of Our Worst Nightmares, Volume 1, S. T. Joshi cites Waluigi and Wario as archetypal examples of alter egos. Wario was used by Todd Harper as an example of the cultural signifiers of fatness that were specifically being created as traits typical of fat characters in fighting games as a whole in a paper for the Journal of Electronic Gaming and Esports. They mentioned that Wario possesses a unique move in which he uses his teeth to efficiently chomp through anything, including other fighters, explosives, and even his own motorcycle. He was also being described as a "slob" archetype. Magazines have also praised Wario's outfit, particularly in Mario Golf: Super Rush. In September 2021, Peter Nguyen, a professional stylist for "The Essential Man", commented on a Hiking Wario outfit in Mario Kart Tour, calling it "stylish" and saying, "I think this is the most wearable and strongest appearance for Wario". He was also described as a "fashion icon". A screenshot of Mario & Sonic at the Olympic Games Tokyo 2020 showing Wario in swimwear appeared to depict him without nipples, leading fans and video game website Polygon to speculate about his lack of anatomical features.
