= WarioWare =

Video game series

- Logo since 2004
- Genres: Action; Party; Puzzle; Rhythm; Sports
- Developers: Nintendo R&D1 (2003); Intelligent Systems (2003–present); Nintendo SPD (2004‍–‍2013); Tose (2023)
- Publisher: Nintendo
- Artist: Ko Takeuchi
- Composers: Ryoji Yoshitomi; Kyoko Miyamoto
- Platforms: Game Boy Advance; GameCube; Nintendo DS; Wii; Nintendo DSi; Wii U; Nintendo 3DS; Nintendo Switch
- First release: WarioWare, Inc.: Mega Microgames! March 21, 2003
- Latest release: WarioWare: Move It! November 3, 2023
- Parent series: Wario

WarioWare (also known as WarioWare, Inc.), known in Japan as Made in Wario (Japanese: メイド イン ワリオ, Hepburn: Meido in Wario), is a series of games featuring the Nintendo character Wario. The series was established in 2003 with the release of Mega Microgames! for the Game Boy Advance. While the first two games were developed by Nintendo R&D1, subsequent games have been co-developed by Intelligent Systems.

The distinctive feature of all WarioWare games is that they are collections of short, simple "microgames" presented in quick succession. The player is given four lives at the beginning of these microgames. Each of these microgames lasts about three to five seconds and must be completed, or else a life will be lost. For example, there is a microgame where the player must zap a spaceship; in another, Wario must collect coins in a Pac-Man-like maze. The numerous microgames are linked together randomly and steadily increase in speed and difficulty as the player progresses. On each level, losing four games results in a game over. After a certain amount of microgames have been played, the player faces a stage-specific boss microgame; the player must complete these to regain a lost life (with a maximum of four lives at any given time). Boss microgames are considerably longer and more complex than other microgames. For example, a boss microgame in Mega Microgames! instructs the player to hit a nail with a hammer multiple times in a row.

== Development ==
The idea of microgames or minigames was popularized generally during the Nintendo 64's fifth generation of video game consoles and some early minigames appear in the Nintendo 64DD's Mario Artist: Talent Studio in the style that would give rise to the WarioWare series. Certain minigames originated in Mario Artist: Polygon Studio, as explained by Goro Abe of Nintendo R&D1's so-called Wario Ware All-Star Team: "In Polygon Studio you could create 3D models and animate them in the game, but there was also a side game included inside. In this game you would have to play short games that came one after another. This is where the idea for Wario Ware came from." Teammate Yoshio Sakamoto continued, "To add on that, we got the idea of using Wario and the other characters because we couldn't think of anyone else who would be best for the role. Wario is always doing stupid things and is really idiotic, so we thought him and the rest of the characters would be best for the game."

== Games ==
List of WarioWare games
Game	Details
WarioWare, Inc.: Mega Microgame$! Original release dates: JP: March 21, 2003; EU: May 23, 2003; NA: May 26, 2003; AU: June 6, 2003	Release years by system: 2003 – Game Boy Advance
WarioWare, Inc.: Mega Microgame$! Original release dates: JP: March 21, 2003; EU: May 23, 2003; NA: May 26, 2003; AU: June 6, 2003	Notes: Mega Microgame$! is the first game in the WarioWare series.
WarioWare, Inc.: Mega Party Game$! Original release dates: JP: October 17, 2003; NA: April 5, 2004; PAL: September 3, 2004	Release years by system: 2003 – GameCube
WarioWare, Inc.: Mega Party Game$! Original release dates: JP: October 17, 2003; NA: April 5, 2004; PAL: September 3, 2004	Notes: Mega Party Game$! is an expanded multiplayer version of WarioWare, Inc.: Mega Microgame$!.
WarioWare: Twisted! Original release dates: JP: October 14, 2004; AU: May 19, 2005; NA: May 23, 2005	Release years by system: 2004 – Game Boy Advance
WarioWare: Touched! Original release dates: JP: December 2, 2004; NA: February 14, 2005; AU: February 26, 2005; EU: March 11, 2005	Release years by system: 2004 – Nintendo DS
WarioWare: Smooth Moves Original release dates: JP: December 2, 2006; EU: January 12, 2007; NA: January 15, 2007; AU: January 25, 2007	Release years by system: 2006 – Wii
WarioWare: Snapped! Original release dates: JP: December 24, 2008; AU: April 2, 2009; EU: April 3, 2009; NA: April 5, 2009; CHN: March 11, 2010	Release years by system: 2008 – Nintendo DSi
WarioWare: Snapped! Original release dates: JP: December 24, 2008; AU: April 2, 2009; EU: April 3, 2009; NA: April 5, 2009; CHN: March 11, 2010	Notes: Snapped! was released via DSiWare.
WarioWare: D.I.Y. Original release dates: JP/ROC: April 29, 2009; NA: March 28, 2010; EU: April 30, 2010; AU: May 20, 2010	Release years by system: 2009 – Nintendo DS
WarioWare: D.I.Y. Showcase Original release dates: JP: April 29, 2009; NA: March 29, 2010; EU: April 30, 2010; AU: May 20, 2010	Release years by system: 2009 – Wii
WarioWare: D.I.Y. Showcase Original release dates: JP: April 29, 2009; NA: March 29, 2010; EU: April 30, 2010; AU: May 20, 2010	Notes: D.I.Y. Showcase was released via WiiWare.
Game & Wario Original release dates: JP: March 28, 2013; NA: June 23, 2013; EU: June 28, 2013	Release years by system: 2013 – Wii U
Game & Wario Original release dates: JP: March 28, 2013; NA: June 23, 2013; EU: June 28, 2013	Notes: Game & Wario is a spin-off from the WarioWare series.
WarioWare Gold Original release dates: EU: July 27, 2018; AU: July 28, 2018; JP: August 2, 2018; NA: August 3, 2018	Release years by system: 2018 – Nintendo 3DS
WarioWare: Get It Together! Original release date: WW: September 10, 2021	Release years by system: 2021 – Nintendo Switch
WarioWare: Move It! Original release date: WW: November 3, 2023	Release years by system: 2023 – Nintendo Switch

== Gameplay ==
Release timeline Main series games in bold
2003	**WarioWare, Inc.: Mega Microgames!**
2003	WarioWare, Inc.: Mega Party Games!
2004	**WarioWare: Twisted!**
2004	**WarioWare: Touched!**
2005
2006	**WarioWare: Smooth Moves**
2007
2008	**WarioWare: Snapped!**
2009	**WarioWare D.I.Y.**
2009	WarioWare D.I.Y. Showcase
2010–2012
2013	Game & Wario
2014–2017
2018	**WarioWare Gold**
2019–2020
2021	**WarioWare: Get It Together!**
2022
2023	**WarioWare: Move It!**

Gameplay in the series revolves around Microgames, simple video games created by the fictional company WarioWare, Inc. Nintendo's line of WarioWare games each feature these microgames, which are generally less than five seconds long. Microgames are even simpler and shorter than the minigames found in other games such as the Mario Party series. Gameplay in all WarioWare games is distinct from most other games, as they involve the player or players trying to beat the microgames as soon as possible. Most games present instructions in the form of a verb and quickly drop the player into the situation where they must perform said verb. The extremely stripped-down gameplay has intrigued some game researchers, who have used WarioWare both as a case study in understanding the relationship between rules and play in videogames, and as a target domain for investigating automated game design.

All microgames are strung together in a random order within different "stages", each hosted by a different character. First, the player is presented with a quick one or two word instruction such as "Eat!" or "Rub!" Then, the microgame will appear and the player will have to complete the game according to the instruction.

Microgames usually have only one task to complete. For example, in one microgame the player is told to "Enter!" and is presented with a scene from The Legend of Zelda. The player must use the directional buttons to move Link to a cave entrance before the time runs out. In another microgame, the player is told to "Avoid!" and must drive a car, avoiding oncoming traffic. Most microgames have a sound effect that signifies when the task is completed. The games by themselves are so brief so as to potentially demand the sharp reflexes of a quick-time event.

Boss microgames always occur at a set point in a stage. They are usually more challenging than regular microgames, have no time limit (as described below), and give lives back upon completion. If a stage is played for the first time, it is completed after the boss microgame. The sound effect will usually play after the task is fulfilled, and then the score screen will return. On repeated plays, if the player has less than four lives, one will be restored.

The unit of time for all microgames is beats. In Mega Microgames! and Twisted!, a standard microgame is 8 beats, double-length microgames (usually IQ-genre games) last 16 beats; Fronk's microgames in Twisted! and Gold only last 4 beats. In most games, the beats per minute (BPM) will start out relatively slow and will increase as the player completes microgames.

In WarioWare: Touched!, the 8-beat standard has been dropped for all microgames, so many last longer than 8 beats. This may be a way to make the game easier for those unaccustomed to the Nintendo DS's touch-screen interface. To retain pace, the microgames will automatically end if cleared before a four-beat measure is met.

To show the time left to complete a microgame, a small "bomb" appears at the bottom of the screen. The fuse and a countdown timer show the amount of time left to complete the microgame. When time runs out, the bomb explodes and in most cases, the player loses a life. The fuse burns faster when the BPM increases.

Some microgames are intrinsically harder than others, and an increased BPM (increased speed) will make any microgame more difficult to complete than the same microgame at a slower BPM. This is usually reflected in the microgames' "clear scores"—the score one must reach while playing a microgame in the practice modes to obtain credit for "clearing" it.

Each microgame features three difficulty levels. Most modes start at the easiest level, and progress to the next upon a "Level Up" (usually achieved after passing a boss microgame). Once the maximum level is reached, sequential "Level Up"s will typically be replaced by "Speed Up"s (an increase in BPM).

Using the above The Legend of Zelda microgame as an example, the first version of this microgame usually places Link very close to the cave entrance that he must enter. The second version places the entrance further away and places an enemy that blocks Link, and the last version places the entrance yet further, and has a second enemy that shoots at Link from a lake.

== Characters ==
There are two major types of character in the WarioWare series. The first are the WarioWare, Inc. developers, who both create and host the microgames. Each one has a unique theme or twist, depending on the game. For instance, Jimmy T.'s microgames in WarioWare: Twisted! are focused around large spins, while in WarioWare: Touched! his microgames involve rubbing objects with the stylus. The second group of characters often show up within the introduction cutscenes—the most notable being Fronk, who hosts "Pop-Up" microgames in WarioWare: Twisted! and WarioWare Gold and pops up in the most unlikely of places.

=== Major characters ===
- 5-Volt (Japanese: ファイブワット, Hepburn: Faibuwatto; lit. '5-Watt') is 9-Volt's mother and makes a few appearances in the WarioWare games. She is never fully seen until Game & Wario, and is a human like her son. 5-Volt lives along with her son and his pet Fronk in a house in Diamond City, and makes her first appearance in WarioWare: Twisted!, where she shouts at 9-Volt to go to bed since he was playing with 18-Volt all day. 5-Volt is seen only from behind, and from the knees down. After 9-Volt has gone to bed, he still furtively plays with his Game Boy Advance SP under the bedspread, but his mother catches him when she opens his room's door a second time. 5-Volt's silhouette is seen in the doorway. 5-Volt is seen again in WarioWare: Touched!, as a silhouette in the Game Over screen of 9-Volt and 18-Volt's stage. She watches her son and his friend eating cake. In Game and Wario, she has a more major role as the main obstacle in the “Gamer” minigame. In Super Smash Bros. for Wii U and Super Smash Bros. Ultimate, she appears as a stage hazard in the Gamer stage. She appears again in WarioWare Gold with her own microgames that are all based on Nintendo games, just like 9-Volt's and 18-Volt's. Since Gold, she has been voiced by Cristina Vee in English and Ruriko Aoki in Japanese.
- 9-Volt (Japanese: ナインボルト, Hepburn: Nainboruto) is a young Nintendo fanatic, owning everything ever made by Nintendo. 9-Volt's microgames are all based on Nintendo games as well as toys from when Nintendo was primarily a toy company. Since Gold, he has been voiced by Melissa Hutchison in English and Makoto Koichi in Japanese.
- 18-Volt (Japanese: エイティーンボルト, Hepburn: Eitīnboruto) is first introduced in WarioWare: Twisted!. He is 9-Volt's best friend, and is also a fan of video games. He is large, but despite his size, he goes to Diamond Elementary School, as does 9-Volt. His other defining trait is the boom box he always carries; his loud music gets him into trouble on his first day of school, although he soon finds an admirer in 9-Volt. Since Gold, he has been voiced by Edward Bosco in English and Subaru Kimura in Japanese.
- Ashley (Japanese: アシュリー, Hepburn: Ashurī) is first introduced in WarioWare: Touched!. She is a 15 year-old witch-in-training, who lives in a haunted mansion in Diamond City with a little demon/devil or imp named Red (Japanese: レッド, Hepburn: Reddo). She has long black hair in two long ponytails. Ashley makes a cameo appearance in Super Smash Bros. for Nintendo 3DS and Wii U as an Assist Trophy character. Ashley also appears in Super Mario Maker as an unlockable Mystery Mushroom costume. Ashley reprised her role as an Assist Trophy in Super Smash Bros. Ultimate. Since Gold, Ashley has been voiced by Erica Lindbeck in English and Ayaka Fukuhara in Japanese, while Red has been voiced by Tyler Shamy in English and Mako Muto in Japanese.
- Dribble (Japanese: ドリブル, Hepburn: Doriburu) and Spitz (Japanese: スピッツ, Hepburn: Supittsu) are two developers who speak with Bronx accents. They also work as cabbies, and their cab, which was designed by Dr. Crygor, has the ability to go anywhere in the universe. Dribble is a large anthropomorphic bulldog with red hair. He is large, burly, and seems gruff, but he is actually quite calm and friendly. Spitz is a yellow anthropomorphic cat. He is always squinting and wears goggles. Their levels generally involve picking up a weird customer and forgetting to ask for the fare. Since Gold, Dribble has been voiced by Kyle Hebert in English and Yūma Kametani in Japanese, while Spitz has been voiced by Griffin Puatu in English and Kazuya Yamaguchi in Japanese.
- Dr. Crygor (Japanese: Dr.クライゴア, Hepburn: Dokutā Kuraigoa) is a quirky scientist whose inventions include his cryogenic suit, Mike, the karaoke robot that would "solve all his cleaning needs", the Super MakerMatic 21, and the Kelorometer diet machine. One of the character card descriptions in WarioWare Gold states that he is over 100 years old. He is the grandfather of Penny Crygor. In WarioWare: Touched, Dr. Crygor accidentally gets caught in his latest invention and is younger and more fit, with red accents to his costume, as well as a full helmet. These changes remain for a part of WarioWare: Smooth Moves. Since Gold, he has been voiced by Kyle Hebert in English and Kensuke Matsui in Japanese.
- The Fronk (Japanese: しゃぎぃ, Hepburn: Shagī) are a strange, blocky, yellow species of creatures. They appear constantly throughout all the WarioWare games, both in microgames and cutscenes. 9-Volt apparently even keeps one of them as a pet, calling it "Shag." In addition to several varieties of yellow Fronk, there are also red and blue varieties; their faces vary individually from each other. Since Gold, 9-Volt's pet Fronk has been voiced by Todd Haberkorn in English and Kazuya Yamaguchi in Japanese.
- Jimmy T. (Japanese: ジミーT., Hepburn: Jimī Tī) is a man with a large blue afro wig, who is a disco dancing fanatic. Jimmy is always seen frequenting hot Diamond City night spots, particularly Club Sugar. His family, which also dances with him includes Papa T. and Mama T., and his brother and sister, James T. and Jamie T. He also has a doppelganger named Jimmy P. whose hair is a different color to his. Their levels often involve remixing the games from previous stages. Since Gold, he has been voiced by Vegas Trip in English and Yūma Kametani in Japanese.
- Kat (Japanese: カット, Hepburn: Katto) and Ana (Japanese: アナ) are kindergarten-aged ninja twins. Kat has pink hair with a single ponytail, while Ana has orange hair with two ponytails. They have four pets: Don the Sparrow, Shadow the Dog, Shuriken the Falcon, and Numchuck the Monkey. Kat & Ana make a cameo appearance in Super Smash Bros. Brawl and Super Smash Bros. for Nintendo 3DS and Wii U as Assist Trophy characters and regular trophies. Since Gold, Kat has been voiced by Stephanie Sheh in English and Maya Enoyoshi in Japanese, while Ana has been voiced by Fryda Wolff in English and Yui Matsuyama in Japanese.
- Lulu (Japanese: ルールー, Hepburn: Rūrū) is a young girl who made her appearance in WarioWare Gold and WarioWare: Get It Together!, coming from an isolated town called Luxeville. Despite her age, she is very smart and brave, considering how she's able to battle Wario Deluxe. Her goal in WarioWare Gold is to retrieve an artifact from her village stolen by Wario. She seems to view herself as a hero of sorts, as supported by her saying "Lulu...the greatest hero ever.." in her sleep during one of the cutscenes. She has been voiced by Alex Cazares in English and Mako Muto in Japanese.
- Mike (Japanese: マイク, Hepburn: Maiku). He is a karaoke robot made by Dr. Crygor, and was introduced in WarioWare: Touched!. Despite being a robot built for karaoke, the slightly mad doctor programs him to be a cleaning robot. Eventually, Mike overrides his cleaning program with his karaoke program by blowing on a pile of dust. Since Gold, he has been voiced by Robbie Daymond in English and Ryōta Suzuki in Japanese.
- Mona (Japanese: モナ) is a high school student with different part-time jobs in each game. Mona is quite adventurous, cheerful and culturally savvy. She always seems to be late to wherever she is going, often speeds on her scooter to make up for lost time, and uses the assistance of her animal companions to stop anyone trying to slow her down. Her former occupations include working at a gelato shop, pizza delivery girl on Mona Pizza, bassist, football cheerleader, and a temple explorer. Also, Mona has a crush on Wario. Since Gold, she has been voiced by Stephanie Sheh in English and Ruriko Aoki in Japanese.
- Orbulon (Japanese: オービュロン, Hepburn: Ōbyuron) is an intelligent alien. He has an IQ of 300. The instruction manual for WarioWare, Inc.: Mega Microgame$! and WarioWare Gold both imply that Orbulon was born in the year 0. Orbulon first wishes to conquer Earth, but after crash-landing on the planet, he settles into life on Earth and ends his mission of conquest. Since Gold, he has been voiced by Robbie Daymond in English and Shinya Hamazoe in Japanese.
- Penny Crygor (Japanese: ペニー・クライゴア, Hepburn: Penī Kuraigoa) was introduced in WarioWare: Smooth Moves. She is the granddaughter of Dr. Crygor and dreams of becoming a great scientist. Her stage in WarioWare Gold reveals that she also has a hidden desire to become a singer. Penny sees her grandfather as an excellent scientist, though she also recognizes his eccentric nature. Since Gold, she has been voiced by Fryda Wolff in English and Maya Enoyoshi in Japanese.
- Pyoro (Japanese: ピョロ) is a character that has his own game in almost every WarioWare title, each one varying in style. The original Pyoro game is Wario's inspiration to found WarioWare, Inc.. Pyoro resembles a round red bird with a white belly, short wings, and a very stretchy tongue. Pyoro 2 (from the GBA version) is the only game where Pyoro is yellow with a tail. Pyoro also appears as a title character in Bird & Beans, the DSi re-release.
- Young Cricket (Japanese: ヤングクリケット, Hepburn: Yangu Kuriketto) is first introduced in Smooth Moves. He has flowing black hair with white streaks and a blue outfit. He practices martial arts and trains with his master, Master Mantis, in the hopes of becoming a kung-fu master. Since Gold, Young Cricket has been voiced by Robbie Daymond in English and Ryōta Suzuki in Japanese, while Master Mantis has been voiced by Owen Thomas in English and Shinya Hamazoe in Japanese.

=== Minor characters ===
- 13-Amp (Japanese: サーティーンアンプ, Hepburn: Sātīn Anpu) is a teenage girl who appears in 18-Volt's stage from WarioWare Gold. She steals a kid's video games, but 18-Volt gives them back after beating 13-Amp in a rap battle. 13-Amp has been voiced by Cristina Vee in English and Yui Matsuyama in Japanese.
- 4.1 and 4.2 are Mona's two wolflike pets who made their first appearance in WarioWare: Touched! (2004). 4.1 and 4.2 only appear during Mona's story. When Vanessa sics The Dinosaurs, other members of her band, in their hawk-like plane on Mona when she travels to the Hawt House, they steal Art, a member of Mona's band, from her van. Pizza Joe comes in, along with her three other animals, to reclaim him. Unfortunately, Mona's animals fail miserably. Joe then distracts The Dinosaurs long enough for 4.1 and 4.2 to come in and use their soccer ball launcher on the Dinosaurs plane. Sadly, even they were unable to save Art from the Dinosaurs. 4.1 and 4.2 have not been seen since.
- Doris 1 (Japanese: クリナ, Hepburn: Kurina) is a robot who appears in WarioWare Gold that was created by Dr. Crygor before Mike. While on an expedition in Agate Forest, Dr. Crygor and Mike encounter Doris 1, who chases Dr. Crygor for abandoning her. After that, they take her back to Dr. Crygor's Lab, where she is forgiven. She was voiced by Fryda Wolff in English and Makoto Koichi in Japanese.
- Bridget the Baker (Japanese: ケーキやのてんいん みやこ, Hepburn: Kekiya no tenin Miyako) is the owner of the Sweet Spot Bakery that Wario visits in the game WarioWare: Touched! (2004). After the dentist Dr. Payne told Wario to stay away from all sweets, (since he got a cavity from eating too many sweets) he left the Dental Clinic and picked up the scent from the bakery. Ignoring what the dentist said, Wario asked Bridget the Baker to give him 10 pies. After a few bites Wario got another cavity and the pain sent him all the way to the Dental Clinic. While he flew away, Bridget bid him goodbye with a friendly "Thank you, come again."
- Cicada (Japanese: シカーダ, Hepburn: Shikāda) is a female trainee of martial arts, who battles Young Cricket disguised as the leader of a penguin army in WarioWare: Move It!. She has been voiced by Erica Lindbeck in English and Ruriko Aoki in Japanese.
- Dark Lord Hum Gree (Japanese: まおうハラ・ペーコ, Hepburn: Maō Hara Pēko) is a demon who appears in WarioWare Gold who makes a monster very hungry. According to Red, he is never satisfied, mean and breathes fire. After being defeated by Ashley, he changes into a different person. His name is a play on the word "hungry".
- Joe (Japanese: ジョー, Hepburn: Jō) is an anthropomorphic beagle who made his first appearance in WarioWare, Inc.: Mega Microgames! (2004). He usually appears alongside Mona, often as a co-worker. Like Mona, he has several occupations throughout the series, such as a gelato shop worker and clothing store owner. Since Gold, he has been voiced by Kyle Hebert in English and Kō Takeuchi in Japanese.
- Vanessa (Japanese: バネッサ, Hepburn: Banessa) is a pop singer from WarioWare: Touched!, her main appearance being as the antagonist of Mona's story, Cute Cuts.
- Sal Out (Japanese: ナオ コモリ, Hepburn: Nao Komori) is Diamond City's popular singer who made her first appearance in WarioWare: Twisted! (2004). She appears during Mona's storyline as the singer for Mona Pizza's commercial.

== Reception and legacy ==
The Guardian likened the series’ format of quick, stripped-down challenges to the “interactive equivalent” of a punk song, emphasizing its speed and compulsive appeal. Commentary has also highlighted WarioWare’s reputation for formal experimentation with game structure and inputs. Writing about the series’ origins, The Guardian described the first WarioWare as an exercise in “gaming deconstruction” built around rapid instructions and five-second micro-games, and characterized later entries as iterating on the idea through different control schemes.

Industry press has similarly summarised WarioWare in terms of how well individual control concepts were executed rather than changing the core format. In that context, Game Developer described the rapid-fire sequencing of microgames as a test of reflexes and concentration and noted that early entries were received warmly for their “unique and well-implemented” play mechanics.

Academic discussion has also used WarioWare as a case study in how games communicate rules and conventions at extremely small scales. In Game Studies, Chaim Gingold argued that WarioWare functions as a “game about games” that foregrounds and distorts familiar design idioms through compressed, rapidly shifting microgames, making it useful for analyzing game design principles.

In legacy coverage, Polygon wrote that the microgame approach of the original WarioWare was rarely imitated outside its own sequel line and has remained a reference point for later projects that explicitly emulate the format. More broadly, The Guardian has referred to WarioWare as a “popular” series in reporting on Nintendo announcements of new entries, reflecting its continued visibility within Nintendo’s catalog.
