= Athenian Rhapsody =

2024 video game

- Developer: Nico Papalia
- Publisher: Top Hat Studios
- Platforms: Windows; PlayStation 5; Xbox Series X/S; Nintendo Switch
- Release: May 14, 2024
- Mode: Single-player

Athenian Rhapsody is a 2024 choose-your-own-adventure action RPG developed by Nico Papalia and published by Top Hat Studios.

== Gameplay ==
Athenian Rhapsody mixes traditional JRPG turn-based combat with bullet-hell elements. It also features segments comparable to WarioWare minigames. The player must navigate the world of Athens while battling enemies, making choices, and solving puzzles that make each playthrough unique. Players will be awarded a memento in the form of a "Rhapsody" at the end of their playthrough that can be collected and traded online. Collected rhapsodies can be stacked to grant additional effects.

Each rhapsody contains detailed information regarding what the player did during a run, such as which followers you used the most/least, how many projectiles you were hit by, and your favorite food.

== Development ==
New York-based developer Nico Papalia began development on the game while learning Gamemaker. He was inspired by Game Boy Advance era titles, using the same resolution of 240 x 160 pixels that the handheld console used.

A prequel titled Tales of Tuscany was announced for release in Spring 2026.

== Release and Reception ==
The game was released on May 14, 2024, for Android, iOS, PC, and consoles.

Pocket Gamer awarded Athenian Rhapsody 4.5/5 stars, praising the game's unique combat system and characters. Nintendo World Report rated the game 8.5/10, and complimented the world design and writing. However, they criticized certain sprite designs and the item storage system.
