= WarioWare Gold =

2018 video game

- European box art featuring Wario and the entire WarioWare cast
- Developer: Intelligent Systems
- Publisher: Nintendo
- Directors: Goro Abe; Yoichi Tada
- Producers: Kensuke Tanabe; Toshio Sengoku; Naoki Nanako
- Designers: Nami Komuro; Ryosuke Kakutani
- Programmer: Yoichi Tada
- Artists: Eiko Hirao; Ko Takeuchi
- Writer: Nami Komuro
- Composers: Daichi Aoki; Yasuhisa Baba
- Series: Wario
- Platform: Nintendo 3DS
- Release: EU: July 27, 2018; AU: July 28, 2018; JP: August 2, 2018; NA: August 3, 2018
- Genre: Action
- Modes: Single-player, multiplayer

WarioWare Gold (Note: Known in Japan as Made in Wario: Gorgeous (Japanese: メイド イン ワリオ ゴージャス, Hepburn: Meido in Wario Gōjasu)) is a 2018 minigame compilation developed by Intelligent Systems and published by Nintendo for the Nintendo 3DS family of video game consoles. The tenth installment in the WarioWare series, it was released in PAL regions in July 2018, and in North America and Japan the following month. The game's plot follows the greedy Wario who has organized a gaming tournament for a large cash prize, with the ultimate goal of claiming the money for himself. Meanwhile, various other WarioWare characters deal with other problems which play out in the form of short stories.

Similar to previous entries, in WarioWare Gold, the player is tasked with completing consecutive "microgames" at increasing paces. Gold features both microgames from past entries in the series and some new ones for a total of over 300 microgames, the most featured in the series to date. After completing the story mode, additional modes such as the challenge mode are unlocked. The game's creative director, Goro Abe, put careful planning in determining which 300 of the 1,100 microgames across the series would be featured. Gold also featured voice acting, a first for the series. Intelligent Systems focused less on collectible items and more on core programming after deeming them not as important.

Gold received generally positive reviews, being praised for its graphics, additional modes, and the introduction of voice acting in multiple languages. Reception of its various collectibles was split, with some finding them worthwhile while others on the contrary. A follow-up for the Nintendo Switch, WarioWare: Get It Together!, was released in 2021.

== Gameplay ==
In this microgame, Wario must shut the door on an unwanted visitor by rapidly pressing the A button.

As is tradition for a WarioWare game, the player is tasked with completing "microgames"—various minigames with very short time limits—in rapid succession. When one is complete, a point is given, and the game moves on to the next. In each stage, microgames appear consecutively, presenting the player with a simple prompt with which to clear the microgame. Failing a microgame, either by losing the game or running out of time, one of four lives will be deducted, with the stage ending once the player runs out of lives. If they run out of lives, the game ends and the high score is displayed, which is determined by how many microgames were passed. When a section of microgames is completed, the player will complete a boss microgame. After which, the minigames can be replayed and will begin to speed up the time allotted.

As a collection game, most microgames that appear have once existed in a previous title in the WarioWare series. These include the Game Boy Advance original, Twisted!, Touched!, Smooth Moves, D.I.Y., and Game & Wario, in addition to some new ones for a total of over 300 microgames. The microgames vary in how they are completed. They involve pressing buttons, tilting the system, touching the touch screen, and blowing on the system's microphone.

Gold features full voice acting in the story mode, a first for the series, with an additional unlockable feature allowing players to redub their own voice over the game's cutscenes. Alongside the story mode, there are missions for the player to complete that awards them with coins that can be used to purchase rewards such as additional minigames. The challenge mode is one of the multiple modes unlocked after completing the story mode. In the challenge mode, the microgames are reintroduced alongside various distractions and complications to the original format. For example, sometimes the screen will be covered in ink or other objects to obscure vision. Additionally, the local multiplayer mode allows players to compete in an endurance competition of who can complete the most minigames in succession.

== Plot ==
Having run out of money following a treasure hunt in the village of Luxeville, Wario decides to organize a gaming tournament, the Wario Bowl, in Diamond City as a get-rich-quick scheme, convincing his friends to design some new Mash League, Twist League, Touch League, & Ultra League (that also include all genres with blowing games & short pop-up games) games based on the Sports, That's Life, Fantasy, & Nintendo Classics themes, for the event, promising them payment. For an entry fee of ten thousand coins, he offers a ten million coin prize to the tournament's winner, although he secretly plots to take all the prize money for himself. While the player competes in the tournament, a girl from Luxeville named Lulu, who has tracked Wario down, calls him out and begins training to challenge him, seeking to retrieve the town's prized treasure (a sizeable golden pot) that Wario had stolen from her village.

The rest of the game consists of self-contained vignettes for all of Wario's friends; these range from Jimmy T trying to impress two girls at Sapphire Street, Mona going to Joe's Clothes trying to find a dress to wear for her party, Dribble and Spitz fighting off UFOs with their space-faring taxi, 5-Volt doing a workout to become fit, Ashley and Red fighting a demon known as Dark Lord Hum Gree, Dr. Crygor and Mike coming across one of Crygor's old inventions, Doris-1, in the spooky Agate Forest, 18-Volt engaging in a rap battle with newcomer 13-Amp to win back a stolen game console at Emerald Street, Penny trying to cure Dr. Crygor after her elixir to help make her a mega pop star gives Dr. Crygor a stomachache, Kat and Ana mistaking Mrs. Munchly, a gourmet master, as their ninja trainer while trying to get ninja learners permits at Diamond City Castle, Fronk helping 9-Volt realize that math's fun, Young Cricket and Master Mantis training at an amusement park, Orbulon trying to acquire pigs in order to complete his order at a fast food restaurant called Gigantaburger, the hosts of the Sports and That's Life themes, along with Mike and Fronk, partying at Club Joe, and the hosts of the Fantasy and Nintendo Classics themes, also with Mike and Fronk, having a potluck at Peridot Campgrounds.

In the game's final level, Wario refuses to give the player the prize money, as he has already declared himself the tournament winner. Putting the pot of Luxeville on top of his head, the pot grants him superpowers. It turns him into the extra-evil, extra-powerful, and extra-unstoppable supervillain version of him called "Wario Deluxe". With Lulu's help, the player beats Wario Deluxe and wins the tournament. She then knocks the pot off Wario's head with a water gun and changes him back to normal. Returning the pot to Lulu after she reveals that it is Luxeville's public toilet, Wario attempts to flee with the money he made from the tournament when his friends intercept him. Taking the small amount of cash (Wario spent most of the money on his hot air balloons) that Wario refused to pay them for their work and splitting it evenly, the player receives their entry fee back. The group even decides to share some of the money with Wario in an act of generosity, though Wario still claims that all the money is his and breaks down crying over his loss. Meanwhile, Lulu returns to Luxeville with the pot, only to learn that the townspeople had bought a new high-tech toilet in her absence, making her whole journey a waste of time.

== Development ==
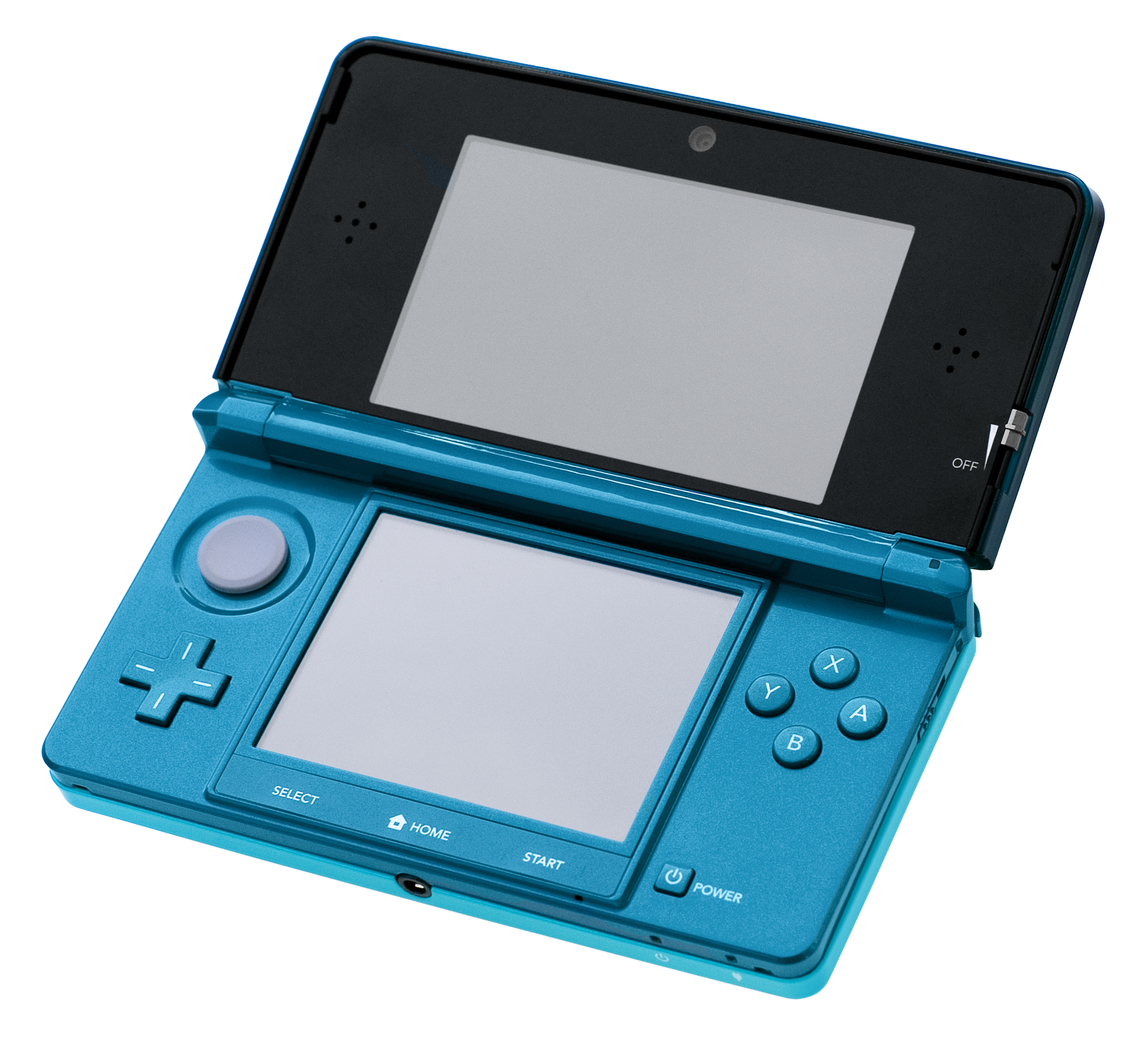
The Nintendo 3DS, shown above, offered opportunities for brand new gameplay styles in WarioWare Gold.

WarioWare Gold was developed for the Nintendo 3DS by Intelligent Systems, the developers behind most previous WarioWare titles, and published by Nintendo. According to Goro Abe, the game's creative director, despite most microgames appearing in prior titles in the series, many of them were reworked from scratch. Since Gold consists of over 300 microgames with the series totaling over 1,100, Abe surveyed opinions from the staff of Intelligent Systems on which microgames the series should include. After he determined the results, he ranked the microgames based on the top picks from the staff, as well as which ones had easy-to-understand rules and games that have not aged well. One of the new gameplay additions was the split-screen challenge mode; this involved the use of the dual screens of the Nintendo 3DS where after one microgame was completed, it would immediately switch over to the other screen. This was a concept the team had wanted to implement since the Nintendo DS, but the idea proved too taxing on the hardware at the time.

In the future, if there's new technology on new hardware that we can use in a new WarioWare title, then we'll probably prep more unlockables with unique and interactive mechanics.

— Goro Abe, Creative Director, in a 2018 interview with Kotaku

Full voice acting was included for the first time in the series, as the development team felt that it would lead to a deeper connection between the player and the game. They also believe the change made the characters feel more alive, although Abe said future games would not necessarily have full voice acting. Wario for instance was voiced by longtime actor Charles Martinet in English-speaking countries. While the game was released after the launch of the Nintendo Switch, Abe ruled out porting WarioWare Gold to the platform, stating it would "come with a number of issues" and that it would be difficult to reproduce "the same sense of fun".

Speaking about the unlockable souvenirs, Abe explained that while Twisted! and Touched! featured a large number of collectibles centered around the gyro and touchscreen as both technologies were still fairly novel at the time, the team felt such unlockables were unnecessary for Gold due to how commonplace both forms of inputs had become. He also explained that with the given time constraints, they preferred to focus on extras that did not require as much programming effort, like the Records. In a 2018 interview with Game Informer, Abe explained that the future of the WarioWare series would be placed on the reception of Gold.

WarioWare Gold was showcased during a Nintendo Direct broadcast in March 2018. The game was released the same year in Europe on July 27, North America on August 3, and Japan a day prior. Shortly before release on June 5, a free demo of the game was available on the Nintendo 3DS eShop.

== Reception ==
Reception

Aggregate scores
Aggregator	Score
Metacritic	78/100
OpenCritic	70% recommend

Review scores
Publication	Score
Destructoid	6.5/10
Eurogamer	4/5
Famitsu	8/10, 8/10, 8/10, 8/10
Game Informer	8/10
GameSpot	8/10
IGN	7/10
Nintendo Life	9/10
Nintendo World Report	9/10
Pocket Gamer	8/10
Shacknews	8/10

WarioWare Gold received "generally favorable reviews" according to review aggregator Metacritic, receiving a 78/100 based on 45 critic reviews. Fellow review aggregator OpenCritic assessed that the game received strong approval, being recommended by 70% of critics.

Despite being a collection of microgames across the series, critics such as Nintendo Life and IGN appreciated the additional work done by Intelligent Systems. In addition, they found the old microgames to be reworked so well they often could not tell the new and the old apart from each other. Nintendo Life's Steve Bowling mentioning how "say[ing] that WarioWare Gold is a mere 'best of' collection would be unfair". Most lauded the introduction of voice acting, with Christian Donlan of Eurogamer joking how the addition, alongside a new graphics style "could, conceivably, be the only thing that's been missing from your life until now". James O'Connor, writing for GameSpot, admired Charles Martinet's impression of Wario; he wrote how he "imbues Wario with a sense of pride and malice here that's a delight to witness".

Some saw the addition of microgames being organized into categories to be a helpful addition, which helped with not having to constantly switch between control schemes such as tapping and button pressing. Nintendo Life found the concept to be helpful when playing in areas where they were constricted in space or the use of the microphone.

Reviewers praised the challenge mode and the unique twists they made on the microgames after completing the main storyline. O'Connor found the concepts to be "tense and exciting", and Bowling saw the experience as "fast, fun and chaotic in the best way". Tristan Ogilvie of IGN, however, sometimes considered hindrances to be rather annoying instead of challenging or unique.

Collectibles received mixed reception; Game Informer's Kyle Hilliard enjoyed the system and called them "worthwhile pursuits", and while he did find some to be more entertaining than others, he praised the system for being unique. Donlan called the collection aspect a fun system to participate in after completing the story mode. Reviewers at Famitsu saw collectibles as neat additions after completing the short story mode. Kotaku found the collectibles to be of varying quality, ranging from fun time-wasters to barely interesting at all. Similarly, IGN and ArsTechnica believed the collectibles were, for the most part, not worth having to constantly replay old microgames.

=== Sales ===
Upon release, WarioWare Gold did not attain placement in NPD's main sales chart for the period, but managed to reach third place on their platform-specific Nintendo 3DS chart, behind Pokémon Ultra Sun and Ultra Moon. Jeff Grubb of VentureBeat attributed the title's low physical sales to the game's main audience having largely moved on from the Nintendo 3DS to the Nintendo Switch. In Japan, Gold was reported to have sold 31,018 physical copies at launch, eventually reaching 93,658 physical copies sold before dropping off of Media Create's weekly sales charts. During a 2020 liquidation sale held by UK retailer Argos, the title was heavily reduced in price. In the week following the discount, Ukie Game Charts reported that the title had reached fifth place for the week ending January 18, 2020, jumping up from the 827th place position it had held in the previous week.

== See also ==
- List of Wario video games
- 2018 in video games
