= Wario (series) =

Video game series

- Wario's emblem on his hat and gloves is used to represent him in many games.
- Genres: Platformer; Puzzle
- Developers: Nintendo R&D1; Nintendo SPD; Nintendo EAD; Nintendo EPD; Intelligent Systems; Good-Feel; Suzak Inc.; Treasure
- Publisher: Nintendo
- Platforms: Game Boy, Nintendo Entertainment System, Super Nintendo Entertainment System, Virtual Boy, Game Boy Color, Game Boy Advance, GameCube, Nintendo DS, Wii, Nintendo DSi, Wii U, Nintendo 3DS, Nintendo Switch
- First release: Wario Land: Super Mario Land 3; 1994
- Latest release: WarioWare: Move It! 2023
- Parent series: Mario
- Spin-offs: Wario Land; WarioWare

Wario (Note: Japanese: ワリオ) is a video game series, a spin-off of the Mario franchise. It comprises various video games created by Nintendo, starring the character Wario. The series began with Wario Land: Super Mario Land 3, the first game to feature Wario as a playable character. The Wario series includes mostly platforming video games and minigame compilations, but also includes other genres.

== Wario Land series ==
The Wario Land series is a platforming series that started with Wario Land: Super Mario Land 3, following Wario's first appearance in Super Mario Land 2: 6 Golden Coins.

=== Wario Land games ===
Release timeline
1994	Wario Land: Super Mario Land 3
1995	Virtual Boy Wario Land
1996–1997
1998	Wario Land II
1999
2000	Wario Land 3
2001	Wario Land 4
2002–2007
2008	Wario Land: Shake It!

In Wario Land, Wario has a castle in Kitchen Island, and often journeys to find treasure. Its gameplay consists of platforming through levels, tossing enemies, breaking blocks and using other abilities.

=== Wario Land characters ===
- Wario (Japanese: ワリオ) was designed as an antagonist to Mario, and first appeared in the 1992 handheld video game Super Mario Land 2: 6 Golden Coins as the main villain and final boss. Since that time, Wario has developed into the protagonist and antihero of his own video game series spanning both handheld and console markets, in addition to his numerous appearances in spin-offs of the Mario franchise. He is voiced by Charles Martinet, who also voices the Mario, Luigi, and Waluigi characters. Wario and Waluigi seem to have been named with respect to the Japanese word warui [悪い], meaning "bad". Therefore, Wario is a "warui Mario" or "bad Mario", and Waluigi is a "warui Luigi" or "bad Luigi".
- Captain Syrup (Japanese: キャプテン・シロップ, Hepburn: Kyaputen Shiroppu) is the main antagonist of Wario Land: Super Mario Land 3 and Wario Land II. She is the leader of a legion of seafaring thieves known as the Brown Sugar Pirates, and is Wario's true archenemy, with Mario close behind. She is a technological genius and inventor, constantly building mechanized apparatuses to assist her in attacking whatever target she chooses. The Pirates' base of operations is Kitchen Island, a gigantic coved island in the middle of the ocean, and their main mode of transportation is the S.S. Teacup, a massive pirate ship. She acts as Wario's ally in Wario Land: Shake It! to have him do all of the work for her; however, she betrays him in the end and steals his treasure.
- Rudy the Clown (Japanese: ナゾのぞう, Hepburn: Nazo no Zō) is the main antagonist of Wario Land 3. Rudy lures Wario into the music box world, claiming that he is the god of the world. He convinces Wario to help break the seal that was placed upon him by the other creatures of the world, with the promise of keeping any treasure Wario finds. After the seal is broken, Rudy reveals himself and attacks Wario. Wario defeats him, and the curse on the other inhabitants is broken. Rudy returns in the video game Dr. Mario 64, where he and Mad Scienstein concoct a plan to steal the Megavitamins from Dr. Mario because he has a cold, and wants the power to cure any illness.

== WarioWare series ==
WarioWare (stylized as ШarioШare and also known as WarioWare, Inc.), known in Japan as Made in Wario (Japanese: メイド イン ワリオ, Hepburn: Meido in Wario), is a series of games featuring the Nintendo character Wario. The series was established in 2003 with the release of Mega Microgames! for the Game Boy Advance. While the first two games were developed by Nintendo R&D1, subsequent games have been co-developed by Intelligent Systems.

The distinctive feature of all WarioWare games is that they are collections of short, simple "microgames" presented in quick succession. The player is given four lives at the beginning of these microgames. Each of these microgames lasts about three to five seconds and must be completed, or else a life will be lost. For example, there is a microgame where the player must zap a spaceship; in another, Wario must collect coins in a Pac-Man-like maze. The numerous microgames are linked together randomly and steadily increase in speed and difficulty as the player progresses. On each level, losing four games results in a game over. After a certain amount of microgames have been played, the player faces a stage-specific boss microgame; the player must complete these to regain a lost life (with a maximum of four lives at any given time). Boss microgames are considerably longer and more complex than other microgames. For example, a boss microgame in Mega Microgames! instructs the player to hit a nail with a hammer multiple times in a row.

The idea of microgames or minigames was popularized generally during the Nintendo 64's fifth generation of video game consoles and some early minigames appear in the Nintendo 64DD's Mario Artist: Talent Studio in the style that would give rise to the WarioWare series. Certain minigames originated in Mario Artist: Polygon Studio, as explained by Goro Abe of Nintendo R&D1's so-called Wario Ware All-Star Team: "In Polygon Studio you could create 3D models and animate them in the game, but there was also a side game included inside. In this game you would have to play short games that came one after another. This is where the idea for Wario Ware came from." Teammate Yoshio Sakamoto continued, "To add on that, we got the idea of using Wario and the other characters because we couldn't think of anyone else who would be best for the role. Wario is always doing stupid things and is really idiotic, so we thought him and the rest of the characters would be best for the game."

Game & Wario, released in 2013, is a spin-off of the WarioWare series.

WarioWare Gold was released worldwide in 2018.

WarioWare: Get It Together! was released on September 10, 2021.

WarioWare: Move It! was released on November 3, 2023.

=== WarioWare games ===
Release timeline
2003	WarioWare, Inc.: Mega Microgames!
2003	WarioWare, Inc.: Mega Party Games!
2004	WarioWare: Twisted!
2004	WarioWare: Touched!
2005
2006	WarioWare: Smooth Moves
2007
2008	WarioWare: Snapped!
2009	WarioWare D.I.Y.
2009	WarioWare D.I.Y. Showcase
2010–2012
2013	Game & Wario
2014–2017
2018	WarioWare Gold
2019–2020
2021	WarioWare: Get It Together!
2022
2023	WarioWare: Move It!

=== Microgames ===
Microgames are simple video games created by the fictional company WarioWare, Inc. Nintendo's line of WarioWare games each feature these microgames, which are generally less than five seconds long. Most games present instructions in the form of a verb and quickly drop the player into the situation where they must perform said verb (such as "jump" or "run"). Other microgames may involve more complex actions, such as having to run and jump in the same microgame. In a stage, microgames are presented in a random order, with a boss microgame stage placed at the end that is more complex and longer. On replay, these stages allow the player to continue playing after beating the boss microgame, with subsequent microgames having an increasingly high speed and difficulty, with the further difficulty changing aspects of the microgames. For example, one microgame, based on The Legend of Zelda, increases the difficulty by adding obstacles in harder difficulties. The extremely stripped-down gameplay has intrigued some game researchers, who have used WarioWare both as a case study in understanding the relationship between rules and play in videogames, and as a target domain for investigating automated game design.

=== WarioWare characters ===
There are two major types of character in the WarioWare series. The first are the WarioWare, Inc. developers, who both create and host the microgames. Each one has a unique theme or twist, depending on the game. For instance, Jimmy T.'s microgames in Twisted! are focused around large spins, while in Touched! his microgames involve rubbing objects with the stylus. The second group of characters often show up within the introduction cutscenes — the most notable being Fronk, who hosts "Pop-Up" microgames in Twisted! and Gold and pops up in the most unlikely of places.

==== Major characters ====
- 5-Volt (Japanese: ファイブワット, Hepburn: Faibuwatto; lit. '5-Watt') is 9-Volt's mother and makes a few appearances in the WarioWare games. She is never fully seen until Game & Wario, and is a human like her son. 5-Volt lives along with her son and his pet Fronk in a house in Diamond City. She makes her first appearance in WarioWare: Twisted!, where she shouts at 9-Volt to go to bed since he was playing with 18-Volt all day. 5-Volt is seen only from behind, and from the knees down. After 9-Volt has gone to bed, he still furtively plays with his Game Boy Advance SP under the bedspread, but his mother catches him when she opens his room's door a second time. 5-Volt's silhouette is seen in the doorway. 5-Volt is seen again in WarioWare: Touched!, as a silhouette in the Game Over screen of 9-Volt and 18-Volt's stage. She watches her son and his friend eating cake. In Game and Wario, she has a more major role as the main obstacle in the “Gamer” minigame. In Super Smash Bros. for Wii U and Super Smash Bros. Ultimate, she appears as a stage hazard in the Gamer stage. She appears again in WarioWare Gold with her own microgames that are all based on Nintendo games, just like 9-Volt's and 18-Volt's. Since Gold, she has been voiced by Cristina Vee in English and Ruriko Aoki in Japanese.
- 9-Volt (Japanese: ナインボルト, Hepburn: Nainboruto) is a young Nintendo fanatic, owning everything ever made by Nintendo. 9-Volt's microgames are all based on Nintendo games as well as toys from when Nintendo was primarily a toy company. Since Gold, he has been voiced by Melissa Hutchison in English and Makoto Koichi in Japanese.
- 18-Volt (Japanese: エイティーンボルト, Hepburn: Eitīnboruto) is 9-Volt's best friend, and is also a fan of video games. He is large, but despite his size, he goes to Diamond Elementary School, as does 9-Volt. His other defining trait is the boom box he always carries; his loud music gets him into trouble on his first day of school, although he soon finds an admirer in 9-Volt. Since Gold, he has been voiced by Edward Bosco in English and Subaru Kimura in Japanese.
- Ashley (Japanese: アシュリー, Hepburn: Ashurī) is a 15-year-old witch-in-training, who lives in a haunted mansion in Diamond City with a little demon/devil or imp named Red (Japanese: レッド, Hepburn: Reddo). She has long black hair in two long ponytails. Ashley makes a cameo appearance in Super Smash Bros. for Nintendo 3DS and Wii U as an Assist Trophy character. Ashley also appears in Super Mario Maker as an unlockable Mystery Mushroom costume. Ashley reprised her role as an Assist Trophy in Super Smash Bros. Ultimate. Since Gold, Ashley has been voiced by Erica Lindbeck in English and Ayaka Fukuhara in Japanese, while Red has been voiced by Tyler Shamy in English and Mako Muto in Japanese.
- Dribble (Japanese: ドリブル, Hepburn: Doriburu) and Spitz (Japanese: スピッツ, Hepburn: Supittsu) are two developers who speak with Bronx accents. They also work as cabbies, and their cab, which was designed by Dr. Crygor, has the ability to go anywhere in the universe. Dribble is a large anthropomorphic bulldog with red hair. He is large, burly, and seems gruff, but he is actually quite calm and friendly. Spitz is a yellow anthropomorphic cat. He is always squinting and wears goggles. Their levels generally involve picking up a weird customer and forgetting to ask for the fare. Since Gold, Dribble has been voiced by Kyle Hebert in English and Yūma Kametani in Japanese, while Spitz has been voiced by Griffin Puatu in English and Kazuya Yamaguchi in Japanese.
- Dr. Crygor (Japanese: Dr.クライゴア, Hepburn: Dokutā Kuraigoa) is a quirky scientist whose inventions include his cryogenic suit, Mike, the karaoke robot that would "solve all his cleaning needs", the Super MakerMatic 21, and the Kelorometer diet machine. One of the character card descriptions in WarioWare Gold states that he is over 100 years old. He is the grandfather of Penny Crygor. In WarioWare: Touched, Dr. Crygor accidentally gets caught in his latest invention and is younger and more fit, with red accents to his costume, as well as a full helmet. These changes remain for a part of WarioWare: Smooth Moves. Since Gold, he has been voiced by Kyle Hebert in English and Kensuke Matsui in Japanese.
- The Fronk (Japanese: しゃぎぃ, Hepburn: Shagī) are a strange, blocky, yellow species of creatures. They appear constantly throughout all the WarioWare games, both in microgames and cutscenes. 9-Volt apparently even keeps one of them as a pet, calling it "Shag." In addition to several varieties of yellow Fronk, there are also red and blue varieties; their faces vary individually from each other. Since Gold, 9-Volt's pet Fronk has been voiced by Todd Haberkorn in English and Kazuya Yamaguchi in Japanese.
- Jimmy T. (Japanese: ジミーT., Hepburn: Jimī Tī) is a man with a large blue afro wig, who is a disco dancing fanatic. Jimmy is always seen frequenting hot Diamond City night spots, particularly Club Sugar. His family, which also dances with him includes Papa T. and Mama T., and his brother and sister, James T. and Jamie T. He also has a doppelganger named Jimmy P. whose hair is a different color to his. Their levels often involve remixing the games from previous stages. Since Gold, he has been voiced by Vegas Trip in English and Yūma Kametani in Japanese.
- Kat (Japanese: カット, Hepburn: Katto) and Ana (Japanese: アナ) are kindergarten-aged ninja twins. Kat has pink hair with a single ponytail, while Ana has orange hair with two ponytails. They have four pets: Don the Sparrow, Shadow the Dog, Shuriken the Falcon, and Numchuck the Monkey. Kat & Ana make a cameo appearance in Super Smash Bros. Brawl and Super Smash Bros. for Nintendo 3DS and Wii U as Assist Trophy characters and regular trophies. Since Gold, Kat has been voiced by Stephanie Sheh in English and Maya Enoyoshi in Japanese, while Ana has been voiced by Fryda Wolff in English and Yui Matsuyama in Japanese.
- Lulu (Japanese: ルールー, Hepburn: Rūrū) is a young girl who made her appearance in WarioWare Gold and WarioWare: Get It Together!, coming from an isolated town called Luxeville. Despite her age, she is very smart and brave, considering how she's able to battle Wario Deluxe. Her goal in WarioWare Gold is to retrieve an artifact from her village stolen by Wario. She seems to view herself as a hero of sorts, as supported by her saying "Lulu...the greatest hero ever.." in her sleep during one of the cutscenes. She has been voiced by Alex Cazares in English and Mako Muto in Japanese.
- Mike (Japanese: マイク, Hepburn: Maiku) is a karaoke robot made by Dr. Crygor. Despite being a robot built for karaoke, the slightly mad doctor programs him to be a cleaning robot. Eventually, Mike overrides his cleaning program with his karaoke program by blowing on a pile of dust. Since Gold, he has been voiced by Robbie Daymond in English and Ryōta Suzuki in Japanese.
- Mona (Japanese: モナ) is a high school student with different part-time jobs in each game. Mona is quite adventurous, cheerful and culturally savvy. She always seems to be late to wherever she is going, often speeds on her scooter to make up for lost time, and uses the assistance of her animal companions to stop anyone trying to slow her down. Her former occupations include working at a gelato shop, pizza delivery girl on Mona Pizza, bassist, football cheerleader, and a temple explorer. Also, Mona has a crush on Wario. Since Gold, she has been voiced by Stephanie Sheh in English and Ruriko Aoki in Japanese.
- Orbulon (Japanese: オービュロン, Hepburn: Ōbyuron) is an intelligent alien. He has an IQ of 300. The instruction manual for WarioWare, Inc.: Mega Microgame$! and WarioWare Gold both imply that Orbulon was born in the year 0. Orbulon first wishes to conquer Earth, but after crash-landing on the planet, he settles into life on Earth and ends his mission of conquest. Since Gold, he has been voiced by Robbie Daymond in English and Shinya Hamazoe in Japanese.
- Penny Crygor (Japanese: ペニー・クライゴア, Hepburn: Penī Kuraigoa) is the granddaughter of Dr. Crygor and dreams of becoming a great scientist. Her stage in WarioWare Gold reveals that she also has a hidden desire to become a singer. Penny sees her grandfather as an excellent scientist, though she also recognizes his eccentric nature. Since Gold, she has been voiced by Fryda Wolff in English and Maya Enoyoshi in Japanese.
- Pyoro (Japanese: ピョロ) is a character that has his own game in almost every WarioWare title, each one varying in style. The original Pyoro game is Wario's inspiration to found WarioWare, Inc.. Pyoro resembles a round red bird with a white belly, short wings, and a very stretchy tongue. Pyoro 2 (from the GBA version) is the only game where Pyoro is yellow with a tail. Pyoro also appears as a title character in Bird & Beans, the DSi re-release.
- Young Cricket (Japanese: ヤングクリケット, Hepburn: Yangu Kuriketto) is first introduced in WarioWare: Smooth Moves. He has flowing black hair with white streaks and a blue outfit. He practices martial arts and trains with his master, Master Mantis, in the hopes of becoming a kung-fu master. Since Gold, Young Cricket has been voiced by Robbie Daymond in English and Ryōta Suzuki in Japanese, while Master Mantis has been voiced by Owen Thomas in English and Shinya Hamazoe in Japanese.

=== External links ===
- Official website

== Other games ==
Wario has starred in puzzle games such as Mario & Wario and Wario's Woods (the latter of which he was featured as the main antagonist while Toad took the role as the main hero), as well as crossing over into the Bomberman universe with Wario Blast: Featuring Bomberman! (1994).
