= WarioWare: Get It Together! =

2021 video game

- Developer: Intelligent Systems
- Publisher: Nintendo
- Directors: Goro Abe; Yu Yamanaka
- Producers: Kensuke Tanabe; Toshio Sengoku; Atsushi Ikuno; Naoki Nakano
- Designer: Teruyuki Hirosawa
- Programmer: Yu Yamanaka
- Artists: Ko Takeuchi; Waki Shigeta
- Composers: Takeru Kanazaki; Yoshito Sekigawa; Shoh Murakami; Daichi Ishihara; Shingo Kataoka; Kanji Hirao; Genki Namura
- Series: Wario
- Engine: Bezel Engine
- Platform: Nintendo Switch
- Release: September 10, 2021
- Genre: Party
- Modes: Single-player, multiplayer

WarioWare: Get It Together! (Note: Known in Japan as Share With Others: Made in Wario (Japanese: おすそわける メイド イン ワリオ, Hepburn: Osusowakeru Meido in Wario)) is a 2021 party video game developed by Intelligent Systems and published by Nintendo for the Nintendo Switch. The 11th installment in the WarioWare series, succeeding WarioWare Gold (2018) for the Nintendo 3DS, the game was released worldwide on September 10, 2021. and sold 1.34 million copies worldwide. It is the final game in the WarioWare series to feature Charles Martinet as the voice of Wario before his retirement from voicing the character (and other characters in the Mario series) in 2023.

WarioWare: Get It Together! received generally positive reviews from critics and was nominated for "Best Family Game" at The Game Awards 2021, as well as "Family Game of the Year" at the 25th Annual D.I.C.E. Awards. As of December 2022, the game had sold more than 1.34 million units worldwide, making it the 83rd-best-selling game for the Nintendo Switch. WarioWare: Get It Together! was succeeded by WarioWare: Move It!, a 2023 title also released for the Switch.

== Gameplay ==
The game's characters play differently from each other, as seen here with Orbulon as player 1 and 18-Volt as player 2.

Get It Together! continues the WarioWare series tradition of tasking players with completing sets of "microgames", which each require the player to clear an objective in just a few seconds. In this game, Wario and his friends have been sucked inside his latest gaming device, meaning they must participate in the microgames themselves.

As such, the game has up to two players control a group of characters, randomly alternating between them in between Microgames. Characters are controlled using the directional stick and a single button, with each character behaving differently in how they move and what actions they can do. For example, Wario flies around on a jetpack and can perform a shoulder charge, Mona alternates between automatically riding her scooter and controlling a boomerang in the air, and 18-Volt fires CDs from a stationary position and can only move around by hooking onto rings. These unique abilities mean each character has different ways of clearing the same microgame. For example, a microgame that requires spinning a windmill around can be cleared by either pushing the windmill physically or hitting it with projectiles. Up to 20 different characters can be unlocked for selection. In each stage, microgames appear consecutively, presenting the player with a simple prompt with which to clear the microgame. Failing a microgame, either by losing the game or running out of time, one of four lives will be deducted, with the stage ending once the player runs out of lives.

There are party-style minigames for up to four players outside of story mode. There is also a ranked mode in the game called the Wario Cup featuring various different challenges.

The player can give presents (named prezzies in-game) to the various playable characters to level them up. Leveling up a character will result in the base score being raised in which can benefit the player in the Wario Cup. The player will also be able to customize the appearance of the playable character of choice. Prezzies can be obtained in the emporium and by other means.

== Plot ==
The game begins with Wario and his friends at his company WarioWare Inc. (which includes Lulu, who previously appeared in WarioWare: Gold) when Wario finishes the game unit they have been developing. When he tries to start it, the console does not turn on, much to Wario and his friends' confusion. Annoyed, Wario tosses the console in the air and he, along with his friends, is sucked into the game as a virtual version of himself. When they wake up, they discover that their game has been invaded by "Game Bugs", which cause corruption and glitches within the game's levels. Wario and his friends have to defeat these bugs to clean the game and return to the real world.

Eventually, the group defeat the game's final bug, the Wario Bug, a corrupted and possessed version of Wario. They then leave the game bugs alone after Wario gives the bugs a home in the final level. "The Supreme Developer", a god-like figure with Wario's nose and mustache, appears to them after that and tells them that he brought Wario and his friends into the game to clear it of the game bugs, which Wario inadvertently caused due to his poor programming skills. He then tells the group that they are free to go. Back outside, everyone learns of Wario's involvement in developing the game bugs and angrily chase him down, but he notices that three of WarioWare's members (Red, Master Mantis and Lulu) are still stuck in the game, and the group goes back into the game to find them.

Upon re-entering the game world, the Supreme Developer tells the group that their friends have been captured, although it was done by a mysterious figure and not the Game Bugs. They then progress through a series of skyscrapers that their friends are trapped within, all three of which have treasure inside of them. When all three pieces of treasure have eventually been collected, the group finds a note that dares them to combine the treasure. Dr. Crygor calls Penny (the only character who is not at WarioWare Inc.) to help after she invents the Jet Tank One in her lab. After she enters the game, they merge the treasures which turn into a watering can that they use to grow a giant beanstalk, but it vanishes afterward, to Wario's distress. They climb the beanstalk and defeat the final boss, who turns out to be Pyoro, the main character of a fictional game franchise within Wario's world, who took up residence in Wario's game too because he wanted to have fun. After his defeat, Wario is disappointed that Pyoro has no more treasure.

== Reception ==
Reception

Aggregate scores
| Aggregator | Score |
|---|---|
| Metacritic | 76/100 |
| OpenCritic | 66% recommend |

Review scores
| Publication | Score |
|---|---|
| Destructoid | 7.5/10 |
| Eurogamer | Recommended |
| Famitsu | 8/10, 8/10, 8/10, 7/10 |
| Game Informer | 7.75/10 |
| GameSpot | 8/10 |
| GamesRadar+ | 3/5 |
| Hardcore Gamer | 3.5/5 |
| IGN | 7/10 |
| Nintendo Life | 9/10 |
| Nintendo World Report | 5.5/10 |
| PCMag | 4/5 |
| Shacknews | 7/10 |
| TouchArcade | 4/5 |
| VentureBeat | 4/5 |
| VG247 | 4/5 |

WarioWare: Get It Together! received "generally favorable" reviews according to the review aggregation website Metacritic. Fellow review aggregator OpenCritic assessed that the game received strong approval, being recommended by 66% of critics. In Japan, four critics from Famitsu gave the game a total score of 31 out of 40.

Game Informer liked the microgames, calling them "creative", but felt the game's need to make each game playable by every character limited the gameplay variety. Praising the story mode, Nintendo Life found it helped introduce the player to each character and their abilities, writing that the use of characters "ups the ante in terms of the series' signature screwiness and the number of ways you've got to engage with it". Eurogamer liked the new micro-games, saying they switched from "line drawings one minute, anime the next, watercolours: it's a riot of imagination".

Overall enjoying the co-op the game offered, The Washington Post wrote that some characters had better movement and abilities, describing it as not "long before I started sticking to the same three to four characters whenever possible, as those with a wider range of movement and access to projectiles definitely had an edge". TouchArcade was mixed on the game, liking the microgames and finale, but feeling there weren't enough collectibles or new games to unlock.

GameSpot praised the art, especially the new character models, saying they were "brought to life here with new 3D models that maintain the look of the sprite-based artwork of their original incarnations while animating more fluidly". PCMag enjoyed the boss fights, feeling they were a good change of pace from the microgames. While praising the new co-op modes, VG247 disliked the limited single-player modes, writing that "the length of the single-player options [is] a little lacking". Destructoid was positive on the idea of different characters, but wrote that many of them were very similar to one another: "I really wish more was done to differentiate a few characters, because the raw count is fairly high, but similar to 'clones' in Warriors games, that number shrinks a bit in practice".

WarioWare: Get It Together! was nominated for "Best Family Game" at The Game Awards 2021, as well as "Family Game of the Year" at the 25th Annual D.I.C.E. Awards.

As of December 2022, WarioWare: Get It Together! had sold 1.34 million copies worldwide.

== See also ==
- List of Wario video games
- List of Nintendo Switch games
- List of party video games
- 2021 in video games
