= Bird & Beans =

2008 video game

- Developer: Nintendo SPD
- Publisher: Nintendo
- Series: WarioWare
- Platform: DSiWare
- Release: JP: December 24, 2008; NA: April 5, 2009; PAL: April 6, 2009
- Genre: Action
- Mode: Single-player

Bird & Beans (Note: Japanese: 鳥とマメ, Hepburn: Tori to Mame), known in PAL territories as Pyoro, is an action game developed and published by Nintendo for the Nintendo DSi's DSiWare service. It is a spin-off of the WarioWare series, featuring enhanced versions of the mini games Pyoro and Pyoro 2 from WarioWare, Inc.: Mega Microgames!. It was released in December 24, 2008 in Japan and April 2009 internationally for 200 DSi Points (equivalent to $2 USD).

== Gameplay ==
Pyoro eats a seed in the main Pyoro mode.

Pyoro requires the player to eat falling beans by shooting Pyoro's tongue in an upward diagonal direction. If a bean lands on the ground, it destroys part of the floor, limiting Pyoro's mobility. If the player eats a differently colored bean, it will restore one of the blocks, and eating a flashing bean restores many, if not all, lost blocks and destroys all on-screen beans. The further Pyoro's tongue is extended, the more points are awarded. If a seed hits Pyoro, the game ends. In Pyoro 2, the player must shoot seeds at the falling beans. More points are awarded when two or more are taken out at the same time. Pyoro 2 is unlocked after beating the high score on Pyoro.

== Reception ==
Ryan Zacher of Nintendo Life gave the game a 9/10 score, noting it to be one of the more enjoyable DSiWare titles with its fun gameplay. Craig Harris of IGN gave the game a 7/10 score, criticizing its derivative nature but nonetheless commended its challenging yet fun gameplay and cheap price point.
