= WarioWare: Move It! =

2023 video game

- Cover art featuring Wario holding the Form Stones
- Developer: Intelligent Systems (Note: Tose assisted on development.)
- Publisher: Nintendo
- Directors: Goro Abe; Waki Shigeta
- Producers: Kensuke Tanabe; Shinya Saito; Atsushi Ikuno
- Designer: Nami Komuro
- Programmer: Yusuke Kitayama
- Artists: Ko Takeuchi; Hiroki Kawamae
- Writer: Nami Komuro
- Composers: Jo Kondo; Haruno Ito; Shomo Murata
- Series: WarioWare
- Platform: Nintendo Switch
- Release: November 3, 2023
- Genre: Party
- Modes: Single-player, multiplayer

WarioWare: Move It! (Note: Japanese: 超おどる メイド イン ワリオ, Hepburn: Chō Odoru Meido in Wario; lit: "Super Dancing Made in Wario") is a 2023 party video game developed by Intelligent Systems and published by Nintendo for the Nintendo Switch. It is the twelfth installment in the WarioWare series, the second WarioWare game to be released on the Nintendo Switch, after Get It Together (2021), and the first direct sequel in the WarioWare series, being a follow-up to the 2006 Wii game WarioWare: Smooth Moves.

Like its predecessors, WarioWare: Move It! is built around a collection of microgames that last a few seconds, and which require that the player hold the Joy-Con controllers in specific positions. The game offers the microgames to the player in rapid succession, by first instructing the player to hold the Joy-Con controllers in a specific manner, and then showing them the microgame. The microgames are divided into several stages, each of which loosely connects the microgames with the help of a story.

The game was announced in a Nintendo Direct on June 21, 2023, and it was released on November 3, 2023. The game received generally positive reviews.

== Gameplay ==
Like previous entries in the WarioWare series, the game tasks players with tackling waves of fast-paced minigames known as "microgames", which are short games that last a few seconds. Similar to the 2006 Wii game, WarioWare: Smooth Moves, which used the system's Wii Remote controller for motion-controlled microgames, the game focuses on using the motion controls of the Nintendo Switch's Joy-Con controllers. Each microgame centers around one of several "forms" depicting how the player should initially hold the Joy-Con, after which players move the controllers accordingly to complete each microgame. In each stage, microgames appear consecutively, presenting the player with a simple prompt with which to clear the microgame. Failing a microgame, either by losing the game or running out of time, one of four lives will be deducted, with the stage ending once the player runs out of lives. In addition to motion controls, some microgames also utilize the infrared camera on the right Joy-Con. The game is broken up into stages, each represented by a WarioWare character and loosely connected by a story, with the microgames divided among the stages. After the player completing a section of microgames, the player will complete the boss stage, which is a microgame that is longer and more complex than the others. After the player completes all of the single-player stages, the player unlocks the bonus island with more game modes. Move It! includes over 200 microgames. The game features local co-op play, where two players must sync their motions with one another to complete microgames, and Party Mode features additional modes for up to four players.

== Plot ==
A TV commercial advertises a chance to visit a vacation resort called "Caresaway Island" by purchasing a garlic burger. A hungry Wario passes by the local burger joint and orders fifty garlic burgers, which results in him winning a trip to Caresaway Island with twenty friends, much to his dismay. After hearing this, Wario's friends ask to come along, and he reluctantly agrees. Upon arriving at the island, the residents give the gang stone Joy-Con called Form Stones, which can be used with one's hands to help them in situations.

The gang then goes on their adventures on the island; Wario attempts to run away from residents of a temple (Stone-Cold Welcome), Mona goes underwater to search for mermaids (Mermaid Meet and Greet), Dr. Crygor, Penny, and Mike time travel to the Stone Age and pose for a cave man's drawing (A Curious Case of Cave Art), Ashley tries to get Red back to standard size after he eats some blueberries that make him tiny (Caveat Imptor), Orbulon gets amnesia and is mistaken for a god by the temple residents (Sweet Dreams, Sweeter Fruit), Kat and Ana try to take back the Caresaway Island map from a group of Cractuses (The Grand Parfait Adventure), Young Cricket battles an army of penguins (Battle on Flashfreeze Cape), Jimmy T. ends up surfing on a shark (Surfin' Surprise), Dribble and Spitz participate in a watercraft race (Making Waves), and 9-Volt tries to save 5-Volt, 18-Volt, and 13-Amp from a spooky store (Quest in the Dark).

In the final level, Lava at First Sight, Wario later returns to the temple he had visited earlier and tries to steal the gold items in it but ends up being overtaken by lava, corrupted, and merged with the island's giant volcano. In his new form, Wario begins to cause havoc on the island. Using the Form Stones, Wario's friends defeat him, and he turns back to normal. He pops out of the volcano and ending up landing back in the temple and is also mistaken for a god by the people in the temple who had attacked him earlier. Wario then declares the events as the worst vacation ever. However, during the credits, a picture depicts Wario, having escaped the temple, enjoying his vacation.

== Development and release ==
WarioWare: Move It! was announced during a Nintendo Direct presentation on June 21, 2023. The game was released worldwide for the Nintendo Switch on November 3, 2023. On August 21, 2023, Nintendo announced that Charles Martinet would be stepping down from voicing Wario and other characters, and confirmed his absence from Move It!. On November 1, 2023, it was confirmed that Kevin Afghani, who voiced Mario and Luigi in Super Mario Bros. Wonder (2023), would take over the role of Wario. Tose assisted on development.

== Reception ==
=== Critical response ===
Reception

Aggregate scores
Aggregator	Score
Metacritic	75/100 (Note: Score based on 90 reviews)
OpenCritic	56% recommend (Note: Rating based on 81 reviews)

Review scores
Publication	Score
Destructoid	7/10
Eurogamer	3/5
Famitsu	35/40
GameSpot	6/10
GamesRadar+	4/5
Hardcore Gamer	3/5
IGN	7/10
Nintendo Life	8/10
PCMag	3.5/5
Shacknews	7/10

WarioWare: Move It! received "generally favorable" reviews, according to review aggregator website Metacritic. On OpenCritic, the game received a "Fair" rating, with 56% of critics recommending it. In Japan, four critics from Famitsu gave the game a total score of 35 out of 40. Nintendo Life gave the game 8/10 stars, praising the game's creativity and multiplayer but criticizing the single player options.

=== Sales ===
WarioWare: Move It! sold 29,000 copies in Japan during the week of its debut, placing it at #3 on the sales charts, behind Super Mario Bros. Wonder and Fashion Dreamer. As of February 2024, the game had sold 167,000 units in Japan.

== See also ==
- List of Wario video games
- List of Nintendo Switch games
- List of party video games
- 2023 in video games
