= WarioWare: Snapped! =

2008 video game

- Developers: Nintendo SPD; Intelligent Systems
- Publisher: Nintendo
- Directors: Taku Sugioka; Naoko Mori
- Producers: Katsuya Yamano; Toshio Sengoku
- Designer: Yohei Kubotsu
- Programmers: Masahiro Oku; Kazuhiko Furukawa; Misuzu Yoshiba; Tetsuya Sato
- Artist: Ko Takeuchi
- Composer: Yasuhisa Baba
- Series: Wario
- Platform: Nintendo DSi
- Release: JP: December 24, 2008; AU: April 2, 2009; EU: April 3, 2009; NA: April 5, 2009; CHN: March 11, 2010
- Genre: Action
- Modes: Single-player, multiplayer

WarioWare: Snapped! (Note: Known in Japan as Photographing Made in Wario (Japanese: うつすメイド イン ワリオ, Hepburn: Utsusu Meido in Wario)) is an action video game developed by Nintendo SPD and Intelligent Systems and published by Nintendo for the Nintendo DSi's DSiWare service. It is the sixth installment of the WarioWare series. It was released on December 24, 2008 in Japan and April 2009 internationally. It features minigames that utilizes the Nintendo DSi Camera featured in previous entries in the WarioWare series, and does not feature any boss stages. It stars five of the characters from the WarioWare series, including Wario, Mona, Jimmy T., and Kat & Ana.

The game received mixed reviews from critics, who panned the inaccuracy of the camera control scheme and criticized the lack of content.

== Gameplay ==
WarioWare: Snapped! shows a silhouette of the player as seen by the camera. This screenshot shows the player about to pick a nose.

WarioWare: Snapped! is set in a theme park. There are four sets of minigames – one featuring Wario, one featuring Mona, one featuring Jimmy T., and one featuring Kat & Ana, with a total of 20 minigames. Two sets were added by an update. It uses the Nintendo DSi's built-in digital camera to make a silhouette of the player to use as a character in the microgames with the Nintendo DSi placed on a flat surface.

The player must put their head and hand to match head and hand outlines on the screen to make sure that the player is at an ideal distance from the DSi. Once the player keeps their pose for three seconds, the game begins. Before each minigame, the player must match their head and sometimes hand or hands with the silhouettes shown on the screen. Once the player gets into the pose, it proceeds to the minigame, and the player must move per what the minigame requires – for example, one minigame requires the player to dry a dog's fur by shaking their head back and forth. Kat & Ana's stages require two players.

At the end of the minigames, pictures of the player's movement are displayed in a slideshow unique to the character. For example, Mona's adds stuff to the player, Jimmy T's throws them into a comic strip, Kat & Ana have fighting practice, and Wario animates their actions. Footageplay antics also show up on the title screen afterwards.

== Development ==
Proposal given during WarioWare: Snapped!'s development, with a caption of "WarioWare: Don't Touch?!"

WarioWare: Snapped! was originally announced as Utsusu Made in Wario for the Japanese version of the DSiWare service in October 2008 upon the announcement of the Nintendo DSi. It was eventually released in Japan on December 24. The game was later released in North America on April 5, 2009 for the same platform. It was developed by Intelligent Systems under Nintendo SPD and published by Nintendo. Its designers included Naoko Mori, Goro Abe, and Taku Sugioka. The developers intended on making Snapped! a game that could be played and enjoyed by people who don't play games.

Due to his focus on the development of WarioWare D.I.Y., director Sugioka left the development of WarioWare: Snapped in Mori's hands. It was conceived when the idea of creating a WarioWare title that makes use of a camera, similar to DS Face Training for Adults, which Intelligent Systems was invited to the development of. The camera included with DS Face Training for Adults was used to make the Nintendo DSi Camera application before the Nintendo DSi hardware existed, and the developers used the camera to create a test model. Abe found the first test model to be strange. It involved players having to hold the Nintendo DSi in either hand and holding the opposite hand in front of the camera. To increase the game's processing speed, the developers made the hand appear on screen as a silhouette. A minigame was provided as an example of something that could be played with this model. In it, players had to cross a ravine, and to do so, they had to put their hands over the ravine to create a bridge for them to cross. When they began testing this model, they found that it was having trouble detecting the hand due to problems with the illumination. At times, shadows would form which the camera would detect by accident. To fix this, the developers laid a black mat underneath so shadows couldn't form. However, someone with a dark suntan would not be detected by the camera, as they would blend in with the mat. They considered a finger sleeve for the player's index finger, which would allow the camera to detect the person regardless of skin tone. They also used a glove at one point. Bundling the game with the finger sleeve and black mat was considered at one point, though Abe stated that it was bound to fail. They moved onto other models, including one that captured the player's feet on camera so that the player could hold the Nintendo DSi with two hands. They however were unsure it would make for good gameplay, thinking it would look weird. Another idea involved secretly taking a picture of someone's face who is standing in front of the Nintendo DSi and using the person's face in-game, such as sticking it up a nostril, but this also did not feel right. At this point, the developers focused on the inside camera of the DSi rather than the outside one, using it to capture the player's own face. The test model for this involved players setting the Nintendo DSi on a flat surface, which the developers found alright, but lacked the sense of speed the WarioWare series has. The catchphrase for this version was "WarioWare: Don't Touch?!".

The project was bogged down and teetering on the edge of an abyss when they were going to submit their final proposal. Mori ran into a programmer on her way home, who told her that the camera was actually running the whole time someone was playing the game, displaying a silhouette but also capturing the player in full detail. She thought that people would be happy to see that at the end, and they added it to the final proposal on the last day. The scenes replaying the players' actions were created as a way to make players say "You got me!" and as a neat way to play the game without touching the DSi. The developers thought that the idea was neat, and though games like it have been done before, they've been a little embarrassing. Due to this, the players' responses are "Oh, I see" as opposed to "Oh, this is interesting..." The proposal also mentioned that players could make funny faces while playing to add to this feature, which the developers sounded like a lot of fun. The developers went on a trip to Okinawa, Japan and took pictures using an underwater camera. While no one wanted to have their picture taken at first, people came to see what was going on. The developers found the psychology of this to be interesting, and it connected to WarioWare: Snapped!. The finale scenes were not implemented into the game yet, one developer commenting that if no one had implemented it, the project would have been cancelled. It couldn't implement it simply from a proposal, and had to make a working model first. When they tested it, they found it very fun, and decided to show it to Iwata as soon as possible. The response from other Intelligent Systems employees to this feature was positive, with people bursting out laughing. Sugioka commented that even the serious employees, practically "busted a gut laughing". While the developers designed the minigames, they also thought of what kinds of gestures would be good for resulting in funny videos. An example of a minigame is one in which players shake their heads from side to side. This was something people do not want others to see them do, and rarely are able to see themselves doing it, so they wanted to implement a game that involves this. They had people test the minigames, watching them as they played. Because some people do not enjoy having their pictures taken, they made it so that the game does not save images from game to game or when the system is closed. The guidelines for the Nintendo DSi were that if a picture is taken, the camera has to make a sound. However, if the game kept making a sound while players played it, it would interfere with the gameplay. The problem was addressed by erasing the videos and photos. If the player does not successfully complete a game, no photos will be taken. Abe stated that if it were a retail game, it may never have been released. Because a game must have a certain amount of content to justify being sold at retail, it was distributed through the DSiWare service for 500 points.

== Reception ==
Reception

Aggregate scores
Aggregator	Score
GameRankings	51%
Metacritic	53/100

Review scores
Publication	Score
GameSpot	4/10
IGN	7.8/10
Nintendo Life	4/10

The game received mixed to negative reviews from critics, who panned the inaccuracy of the camera control scheme and the lack of content. It has a score of 53 on review aggregator Metacritic, the lowest of any WarioWare or Wario game. It is the second lowest rated game part of the greater Mario franchise after Donkey Kong: Barrel Blast, which is the worst rated.

In IGN's Japanese DSiWare impressions, they commented that they found the camera not up to the task of making this game entertaining. They disliked that the player's head and hands are shown as silhouettes, and how difficult it was to get the right lighting. They also commented that even when the game works, that it's not fun. They criticized the minigames for giving the player a lot of time, saying that it loses the intensity of its predecessor as a result, which was praised for allowing the player to play them in short bursts. In Anoop Gantayat's impressions, he commented that because it shows himself in silhouette form, it's hard for him to tell the difference between his head and hand sometimes, and that the game often couldn't tell either. He said that he was not able to complete a full game of it because of this problem, and that the minigames weren't very fun anyway, suggesting that gamers save their yen. Tiny Cartridge found the "goofy microgames" to be enjoyable, as well as the slideshow at the end showing the player acting silly at the end of a set of minigames, but criticized it for having difficulty in getting the camera to work due to the lighting.

On the western market, it received mixed reviews. GameRankings calculate an average of 51%, based on 14 reviews. GameSpot gave the game a "poor" 4/10 score, criticizing its lack of content and the camera's sensitivity, ending the review by saying that "you can get much better value from your 500 Nintendo points than spending them on Snapped". IGN on the other hand gave the game a 7.8/10, praising the fun minigames while criticizing its camera functionality as well as the inability to save pictures.
