= WarioWare: Touched! =

2004 video game

- North American cover art
- Developers: Nintendo SPD; Intelligent Systems
- Publisher: Nintendo
- Director: Ryuichi Nakada
- Producers: Yoshio Sakamoto; Ryoichi Kitanishi
- Designer: Yoshio Sakamoto
- Artist: Ko Takeuchi
- Composers: Masanobu Matsunaga; Yasuhisa Baba; Masaru Tajima
- Series: WarioWare
- Platform: Nintendo DS
- Release: JP: December 2, 2004; NA: February 14, 2005; AU: February 26, 2005; EU: March 11, 2005
- Genre: Action
- Mode: Single-player

WarioWare: Touched! (Note: Sawaru Made in Wario (さわる メイドインワリオ; Touching: Made in Wario)) is a 2004 action game developed by Nintendo SPD and Intelligent Systems and published by Nintendo for the Nintendo DS. It is the fourth installment of the WarioWare series, and the first of three on the Nintendo DS, the game involves rapidly completing "microgames" — simple minigames lasting extremely short periods of time — as quickly as possible. The microgames are exclusively controlled with the Nintendo DS's touchscreen and microphone.

The game was developed simultaneously with WarioWare: Twisted! The game was created to utilize the touchscreen functions of the Nintendo DS. WarioWare: Touched! was released in December 2004 in Japan, in February 2005 in both North America and Australia and in March of the same year in Europe. Touched! was a launch title for the Japanese, Australian, and European markets.

The game was positively received upon its release, with reviewers praising it for its fast-paced gameplay akin to other WarioWare titles, but disappointed by its brevity. Touched! introduced recurring character Ashley to the series and used the touchscreen and microphone for the first time. Many of the microgames in Touched! reappeared in WarioWare Gold. The game was re-released on the Wii U Virtual Console service in 2015 and briefly on the Nintendo 3DS the following year. The North American and Australian box arts are colored orange, while the box art for all the other regions are colored yellow.

== Plot ==
In the game's opening cutscene, Wario, haven stolen two consoles as a deal, accidentally trips and drops them down a nearby sewer. The Sewer Guru then appears and asks Wario if he had dropped a two-screened console, or the consoles that he had dropped. After tackling the Sewer Guru after demanding all of them, and learning that it is controlled via touching the bottom screen when the two screened console's stylus comes out, Wario decides to develop games for it to make money. The rest of the game features self-contained stories for every character in their stages: Wario gets a toothache after eating too many sweets, Jimmy T. gets a bug in his hair while dancing with his family, Mona plays in a concert, Ashley sends her assistant and only friend, Red, to capture Orbulon, Kat and Ana try to locate their stolen bananas, Dr. Crygor upgrades himself with his new invention, T.U.N.A, Mike does karaoke for a planet of alien bunnies, and 9-Volt and 18-Volt play "36-Volt Man", a new game 9-Volt had just got. In the game's final level, Wario eats some "nasty garlic" when he gets sick, and turns into his superhero alter-ego, Wario-Man.

Each unlocked character (aside from 4) has their own collection of short minigames, referred to as "microgames". These often use character specific control methods, such as Dr. Crygor's collection, referred to as "Slightly Unscrewed", being based on circular motions, like reeling in a fish or swimming, and Mike's collection being based on microphone use, such as blowing bubbles in a drink or using an animal shaped whistle. Completing the story mode for Jimmy T reveals he has 2 siblings, Jamie and James T, both of which can be unlocked as playable characters. However, instead of having special gimmicks like the others, they reuse existing games in a compilation. The later unlocked "Monster" and "Hardcore" mix are the same, however these use every character, instead of James and Jamie's usage of only 3 each. Wario and his superhero form lacks the gimmick driven nature of the other characters and instead uses a variety of touch control styles, such as drawing a fuse or tapping to pet a cat, compared to just one method with the others.

Competing a story mode quest or gaining above a certain number of points in any given character's collection awards the player another game. These are referred to as "Souvenirs" and range from a Yo-yo to a "Grandma Simulator", in which you blow on tea using the mic and a grandma gives you advice based on your method of blowing on her tea.

== Gameplay ==
The microgame "Bright Idea". The player must use the touchscreen to connect the correct wires to the battery. There are two seconds remaining on the timer.

The game uses the same type of gameplay as in past WarioWare titles; the player must complete "microgames", a variation of "minigames". The player is given brief instructions before each microgame, such as "Find!", "Rotate!" or "Shoot!". In each stage, microgames appear consecutively, presenting the player with a simple prompt with which to clear the microgame. Failing a microgame, either by losing the game or running out of time, one of four lives will be deducted, with the stage ending once the player runs out of lives. If they run out of lives, the game ends and the high score is displayed, with the player's three previous highest scores. The game speeds up as it progresses. After completing a section of microgames, the player must complete a "boss stage"; a longer, typically more difficult microgame.

Touched! introduced touchscreen and microphone controls to the WarioWare series; all microgames can only be controlled with either of the two. The game has 180 microgames, not including boss stages. The game's nine stages have 20 microgames in each. Each level has a different theme, character, stage intermission and input style. All input styles use the stylus to interact with the touch screen in various ways, such as poking or dragging. Some microgames use the system's microphone; the player controls the game by blowing into it. In addition to the main stages, the player can access "toys" by completing a stage. These toys are simple minigames, sometimes based on microgames from the main stage.

== Development and release ==
It's [Nintendo's] our mission to give our images shape, which can be conveyed to other people. I want to make the game that makes the best possible reaction from my intended audience.

— Yoshio Sakamoto, at the 2010 Game Developers' Conference, on why he can make both Metroid games and WarioWare games; both serious and more comical games.

The game, developed by Intelligent Systems and Nintendo SPD, began its development during the development of WarioWare: Twisted!. The team working on Twisted! was split in two; one to continue work on Twisted! and the other to begin Touched!. In the game's inception, the development team wanted to use the technology of the Nintendo DS in the next iteration of the series like how Twisted! uses game cartridge's vibrating structure gyroscope as a key game mechanic. The game was first revealed alongside the first Nintendo DS public demonstration in the form of a short demo. Touched! was produced by Yoshio Sakamoto and Ryoichi Kitanishi and directed by Goro Abe, Taku Sugioka and Teruyuki Hirosawa. The game's music was composed by Masanobu Matsunaga and Yashuhisa Baba.

Published worldwide by Nintendo, it was released as a launch title for the Nintendo DS in Japan on December 2, 2004, alongside Super Mario 64 DS and other titles. It was released two months later in North America on February 14, 2005, and in Australia on February 24, as the second first-party title published on the system for the regions. It was released on March 11 in Europe in the same year, as a launch title for the region. It is the third installment of the series, and the first of three to be released on the Nintendo DS. The game was re-released on the Wii U as part of its Virtual Console service in Europe and Australia on April 2, 2015, on April 9 in North America and on April 15 in Japan in the same year. A DSiWare port titled WarioWare: Touched! DL was released on the Nintendo 3DS as a limited-time reward for My Nintendo members on March 17, 2016, in Japan and March 31 of the same year in North America, Europe and Australia.

== Reception ==
Reception

Aggregate score
Aggregator	Score
Metacritic	81/100

Review scores
Publication	Score
Eurogamer	7/10
GameSpot	7.2/10
GameZone	9/10
IGN	8.5/10
Nintendo Life	DS: 9/10; Wii U: 7/10
Nintendo World Report	DS: 7/10; Wii U: 6/10
Official Nintendo Magazine	91%

WarioWare: Touched! received generally favorable reviews, receiving a score of 81 on review aggregator Metacritic. The game was praised for its visual style, microgame-based gameplay and callbacks to retro Nintendo games, as it was criticized for its brevity and enjoyability in comparison to past titles in its series. Touched!'s use of touchscreen mechanics was polarized amongst reviewers. Ben Kosmina writing for Nintendo World Report found that the stylus and microphone controlled the game "flawlessly", and applauded the inclusion of a mode for left-handed people. Other reviewers also applauded the game for its touchscreen controls. However, other reviewers criticized the control scheme. Jeff Gerstmann reviewing the game for GameSpot stated that the game "leans way too heavily on the touchscreen for its own good", citing that many of the methods to complete the game's microgames are too similar. Despite this, critics praised the game's use of the Nintendo DS' dual display. The game's visual style was commonly lauded by critics. Kosmina described the game as having "a potpourri of different styles", referencing the non-conforming nature of the game's artstyle. Craig Harris, writing for IGN, stated that "the variety of styles and graphic techniques work to the game's advantage". Another common point of praise amongst critics was the game's references to past Nintendo games and systems in the character 9-Volt's stage "Retro Action" in its microgames and its sound effects. The game references Super Mario Bros., The Legend of Zelda, Metroid and the Game & Watch series, among other classic titles. The game's soundtrack was also praised, specifically "Ashley's Theme" and "Mike's Song" for its full localization to English.

The microgame-based gameplay in Touched! was commended for its unique nature, but many reviewers found that the game was less enjoyable in comparison to the series' past iterations, WarioWare, Inc.: Mega Microgames! and WarioWare: Twisted!. In addition, Kosmina expressed concern about the future gameplay possibilities of touchscreen controls as the microgames "Pro Bowling" and "Galaxy Bounce" were similar to that of other minigames in Feel the Magic: XY/XX and Super Mario 64 DS, other early titles for the Nintendo DS. Another common point of criticism for Touched! was its short length. Kosmina called the game a "fairly short version of the GBA game [WarioWare, Inc.: Mega Microgames] with not much replay value". The game's Wii U re-release was applauded for its variability in its display options, with critics stating that the vertical GamePad-only display was the best choice. In contrast, James Charlton writing for Nintendo World Report wrote that the game's touchscreen controls had aged poorly, citing that "in the era of capacitive touch screens, the sluggishness of using a stylus [can make] these touch microgames frustrating".

=== Legacy ===
The touchscreen and microphone-based gameplay first implemented in Touched! has become a recurring mechanic in the WarioWare series and is present in most subsequent titles. Many microgames featured in Touched! make appearances in WarioWare Gold. Touched! also marks the first appearance of the recurring WarioWare character Ashley, who has since appeared in WarioWare: Smooth Moves, WarioWare D.I.Y., Game & Wario and WarioWare Gold. Ashley has also made regular appearances in the Super Smash Bros. series; in Super Smash Bros. Brawl as a sticker and in Super Smash Bros. for Wii U and Nintendo 3DS as an assist trophy, wearable Mii outfit and trophy. She has also made cameo appearances in Nintendo Badge Arcade, Rhythm Heaven Megamix and Super Mario Maker. Versions of "Ashley's Theme", which plays during Ashley's stage in Touched!, appear in Brawl and for Wii U and 3DS as selectable songs. "Mike's Song" also appears in Brawl. The songs can be played in both English and Japanese.
