= WarioWare, Inc.: Mega Party Games! =

2003 video game

- North American box art
- Developers: Nintendo R&D1; Intelligent Systems
- Publisher: Nintendo
- Directors: Goro Abe; Osamu Yamauchi
- Producers: Takehiro Izushi; Ryoichi Kitanishi
- Artist: Ko Takeuchi
- Composers: Masanobu Matsunaga; Kenichi Nishimaki
- Series: Wario
- Platform: GameCube
- Release: JP: October 17, 2003; NA: April 5, 2004; PAL: September 3, 2004
- Genre: Party game
- Modes: Single-player, multiplayer

WarioWare, Inc.: Mega Party Games! (Note: Known in Japan as Atsumare!! Made in Wario (あつまれ!!メイド イン ワリオ, literally Gather!! Made in Wario), stylized as WarioWare, Inc.: Mega Party Game$!) is a 2003 party video game developed by Nintendo R&D1 and Intelligent Systems and published by Nintendo for the GameCube. It is a remake of WarioWare, Inc.: Mega Microgames!, and the second installment in the WarioWare series, the game translates the "microgame" gameplay of Mega Microgames! to be playable in a multiplayer environment. It comes with eight special multiplayer modes for up to four players that all involve the known microgames in some way.

== Gameplay ==
The gameplay in Mega Party Games! shares elements with other WarioWare titles, emphasizing quick consecutive minigames for the player to complete (dubbed by the game as "microgames"); it includes all of the microgames from the original WarioWare, Inc.: Mega Microgames!. However, the game places a heavier emphasis on multiplayer than other series entries. In addition to a basic single-player mode, the game features several multiplayer variations, each of which utilizes the microgames in different ways. Some of these include "Survival Fever", in which players are eliminated after failing three microgames; "Balloon Bang" in which players attempt to not be actively playing a microgame when a balloon inflated by the other players bursts; "Listen to the Doctor", in which players must perform a given action while completing a microgame and are rated by their opponents; and "Wobbly Bobbly", in which players must keep a stack of turtles balanced, with another turtle being added after each microgame.

== Development ==
The game was developed by Intelligent Systems and Nintendo Research & Development 1, and published worldwide by Nintendo in October 2003 in Japan, and a year later in April for North America and in September for Europe. The game was produced by Takehiro Izushi and Ryoichi Kitanishi, directed by Goro Abe and Osamu Yamauchi and composed by Masanobu Matsunaga and Kenichi Nishimaki.

== Reception ==
Mega Party Games! received generally favorable reviews upon release, with reviewers commonly citing the game's multiplayer appeal as a positive, but its copied material from Mega Microgames! as a negative. GameRankings gave the game an aggregated score of 77% based on 53 reviews. The game is the first in the series to introduce a focus of multiplayer, a theme that would not be re-visited by the series until the console sequel WarioWare: Smooth Moves on the Wii in 2006. During the 8th Annual Interactive Achievement Awards, WarioWare, Inc.: Mega Party Games! received a nomination for "Console Family Game of the Year" by the Academy of Interactive Arts & Sciences.

Reception

Aggregate scores
Aggregator	Score
GameRankings	77%
Metacritic	76/100

Review scores
Publication	Score
Eurogamer	7/10
GameSpot	7/10
GameSpy	4/5
IGN	7.5/10
Nintendo World Report	8.5/10
