= WarioWare D.I.Y. =

2009 video game

- North American box art
- Developers: Nintendo SPD; Intelligent Systems
- Publisher: Nintendo
- Directors: Goro Abe; Taku Sugioka
- Producers: Yoshio Sakamoto; Toshio Sengoku
- Designer: Masahiko Nagaya
- Programmer: Taku Sugioka
- Artists: Ko Takeuchi; Masahiko Nagaya; Asako Kagita
- Writer: Kyoko Watanabe
- Composers: Kenichi Nishimaki; Takeru Kanazaki
- Series: Wario
- Platform: Nintendo DS
- Release: JP/ROC: April 29, 2009; NA: March 28, 2010; EU: April 30, 2010; AU: May 20, 2010
- Genres: Action, game creation system
- Mode: Single-player

WarioWare D.I.Y. (Note: Known in Japan as Made by Me (Japanese: メイドイン俺, Hepburn: Made in Ore)), also known as WarioWare: Do It Yourself in Europe and Australia, is a minigame compilation and game creation system developed by Nintendo SPD and Intelligent Systems and published by Nintendo for the Nintendo DS. It is the seventh title in the WarioWare series and the last to be developed for the Nintendo DS family of systems. Formally revealed at Nintendo's conference in October 2008, the game was released in Japan on April 29, 2009. It was released in 2010 in North America, Europe, and Australia respectively and was accompanied by a separate WiiWare title, WarioWare: D.I.Y. Showcase.

== Gameplay ==
WarioWare D.I.Y. allows players to design their own microgames, creating their own graphics and music, and designing a 'cartridge' for them. The game features five sections in its main menu: D.I.Y. Studio, where the player designs microgames; WarioWare Inc., the tutorial; D.I.Y Shop, where the player makes microgame cartridges; Options Garage, where players edit preferences and names; and Distribution Center, in which players send games to the Wii or vice versa. Players can also receive games from the NinSoft store while at the Distribution Center. Due to its cross-compatibility with the Wii, the gameplay is restricted to tapping mechanics. When creating the music, the player can hum into the DS's microphone, which the DS then converts into notes, or create their own music. These notes can then be performed by various instruments such as pig noises, similar to music creation in Mario Paint.

Prior to the discontinuation of Nintendo Wi-Fi Connection in May 2014, players could send their creations to other D.I.Y. owners or receive other people's works. They could also be uploaded online for contest purposes. Additional microgames pre-built by Nintendo could be downloaded from the service, along with "Big Name Games", microgames created by well-known individuals such as other game developers or television personalities.

Additionally, the WiiWare game WarioWare: D.I.Y. Showcase allows users to play the microgames on the Wii using the Wii Remote.

Aside from the user-generated microgames, WarioWare D.I.Y. includes 167 pre-made microgames featuring the characters Mona, Jimmy T., Ashley, Orbulon, 9-Volt, 18-Volt, Dribble & Spitz, Kat & Ana, and Wario-Man. Each character has microgames set to certain themes, similar to the original WarioWare, Inc.: Mega Microgames!.

== Plot ==
One day, Dr. Crygor dreams that he is playing on a game console (which resembles a Wii with a Classic Controller). Suddenly, the characters in the game emerge from the screen, causing a stampede. Waking up from the nightmare, Dr. Crygor comes up with a brainstorm and invents the Super MakerMatic 21, an invention that can make Nintendo DS games that can be played in DS cartridges or also be uploaded onto a Wii, comic books and graphic novels, and music records, soundtracks, and songs. While the machines are being assembled in Dr. Crygor's lab, Wario enters with a broken television set for repair and notices the Super MakerMatic 21 is being assembled. He wants to trade his broken television for one of the Super MakerMatics (thinking that it is a television set as well), at which point Dr. Crygor explains what it actually is and its ability to make DS/Wii games, comic books, and music records easily. Wario is amazed and realizes that Dr. Crygor's invention is the key to making huge fortunes and revamps WarioWare, Inc. once again, as well as a subsidiary called Wario-Man Software. Unfortunately, many of his employees (Mona, Jimmy T, Ashley and Red, Orbulon, and 9-Volt) had quit for a rival company, Diamond Software, and its subsidiaries, recording studio Diamond Studios and book publisher Diamond Publishing, leaving Dr. Crygor, Penny, Young Cricket and Master Mantis, Dribble and Spitz, Kat and Ana, and 18-Volt behind with Wario, so they hire the player, a shop manager, to help make their games, books, & records.

== Development ==
Development of WarioWare D.I.Y. began in September 2003 when series director Goro Abe decided that due to how entertaining it was for the team to create microgames, they should make a game that allowed players to do the same. In an interview, Abe referenced other video games that allow players to create their own role-playing or shooting games, but despite finding it fun he would quit making them before finishing them. Because of this, he decided that the short nature of the WarioWare series' microgames were perfect for this kind of game, allowing for those with a shorter attention span to make use of the game. Development took a long time as a result of the launch of the successor to the Game Boy Advance, the touch-controlled Nintendo DS, which Abe felt was a more ideal way to create microgames. However, due to a combination of the difficulty in creating microgames and other projects Abe had to develop at the time, the title was put on hold and development ceased for a time.

The project gained new life during the development of the Wii title WarioWare: Smooth Moves when the developers learned of the WiiConnect24 feature that allows players to exchange or send data to other players. He decided that with D.I.Y., players would be able to make microgames on the Nintendo DS and then send them to the Wii to play. Development restarted after the completion of Smooth Moves. Another designer, Masahito Hatakeyama, got involved after discussing the project with Abe. Hatakeyama was also interested in video games that allow players to make their own content, but he suffered from the same problem and would quit creating his content a third of the way through. He also cited Mario Paint as another influence for allowing him to make his own content. He eventually asked Abe if he could participate in the game's development, which Abe agreed to. Taku Sugioka, an employee of Intelligent Systems who had also worked on the DSiWare video game WarioWare: Snapped!, had heard that after Smooth Moves was completed, Abe was going to try something new. Soon after, Abe asked him if he would be interested in participating in its development. He found it to be an interesting project, but was not sure if Abe's ideas could translate well into a video game.

The drawing and music-making portions were made to be based on the drawing and music-making tools of Mario Paint. However, they found difficulty in designing the portion of the game where players designate the objectives of the microgames. Originally, they intended to make characters and items, which they designated as "objects", able to move depending on the players wishes, but they needed to make the game interactive and approachable for players. After Smooth Moves, development of D.I.Y. took two more years to complete; one of those years was spent attempting to figure out how to make such interaction and approachability doable. Eventually, they decided on splitting the microgame design process into three phases – the object phase, the background phase, and the sound phase. They created a framework on which they viewed as successful after a designer created a microgame in a few hours. The first version of the editor was far less complex than that of the final version, the approach being to start with a small number of necessary functions and only add others if necessary, rather than having an overly complex editor and removing unnecessary functions. To test its capabilities, the development team set to recreate Wario's stage in WarioWare: Touched! They were able to replicate "almost 100%", with some adjustments made to games that could not be fully recreated. During development, Abe emphasized to the other staff members that it was unnecessary to create highly complex and technical games, as they would only last a few seconds.

At this point, the development had picked up, Sugioka commenting that the team was amazed by this since he was just a designer and not a programmer, meaning he did not have access to special techniques to do this. As the development continued, the game design mechanics grew from the simple test model, as if they were adding to a puzzle, in Sugioka's words. The developers intended on keeping it simple, however, only implementing six buttons. For example, for a microgame that features a jumping character, players may dictate where the character may jump by selecting the "Boing!" button. While Hatakeyama wanted to add more functionality, Abe retorted by commenting either that the player could combine two functions to do what Hatakeyama wanted or that the microgames only lasted a few seconds and did not need to be too complex. The development team attempted to recreate microgames from WarioWare: Touched! to test how easy it would be for players to do so. For some they could recreate, while others they could not. In response, they adjusted the game to make the ones they could not recreate workable. The debugging process was a difficult part of the development due to how many possibilities there were in creating microgames.

While the game originally was going to use a normal Nintendo DS game cartridge, it uses a NAND flash memory card in order to save and load microgames faster and allow players to store more microgames. While this was initially rejected due to a tight schedule, it was eventually implemented. However, during the mass production phase of the development, the game would stop when they tried to utilize the memory. Sugioka was placed in charge of debugging the NAND card, and eventually found the cause. While Abe considered that there would be people who would not want to make microgames, he implemented a feature that would allow players to edit the microgames the developers included to make their own. Initially, they considered having players download microgames from people who have given their friend codes to them, Abe commenting that microgames made by friends and family are more entertaining than those downloaded from anonymous people. Both methods of exchanging microgames were eventually implemented in the final game.

In 2017 a site named DoujinSoft launched as an archive of games, records, and comics that users created. Most games prior to the Nintendo WFC closure are preserved, and all content can be played through the website. Additionally, content can be sent to a modded Wii console that has Showcase installed.

== WarioWare: D.I.Y. Showcase ==
WarioWare: D.I.Y. Showcase
- Developers: Nintendo SPD; Intelligent Systems
- Publisher: Nintendo
- Series: Wario
- Platform: WiiWare
- Release: JP: April 29, 2009; NA: March 29, 2010; EU: April 30, 2010; AU: May 20, 2010
- Genre: Action
- Mode: Multiplayer

WarioWare D.I.Y. also uses connectivity with a WiiWare title called WarioWare: D.I.Y. Showcase, (Note: Known in Japan as Asobu Made in Ore (Japanese: あそぶメイドイン俺; lit. "Play Made by Me")) known as WarioWare: Do It Yourself - Showcase in PAL regions, allowing users to upload their creations to play on a big screen, and even upload them for contests. The game allows players to play up to 72 pre-made games, listen to pre-made music, or read pre-made comics. Players can also play, listen, or read the things they have already made. Along with that, users can fill out surveys for games that their friends have made. They can also download new content as it becomes available and upload their games for other players to download. WarioWare: D.I.Y. Showcase also includes an unlockable versus mode, but options are limited to shuffling every game, user-created and pre-made, alike.

== Reception ==
Reception

Aggregate scores
Aggregator	Score
GameRankings	84.64%
Metacritic	82/100

Review scores
Publication	Score
Destructoid	8.5/10
Edge	8/10
Eurogamer	8/10
Game Informer	8.5/10
GameRevolution	7/10
GamesRadar+	4.5/5
Giant Bomb	4/5
IGN	9/10
Nintendo Life	9/10
Nintendo World Report	8.5/10
Official Nintendo Magazine	92%
Pocket Gamer	9/10

WarioWare D.I.Y. holds a score of 82/100 on the review aggregation website Metacritic, indicating generally favorable reviews. IGN gave the game an 'Outstanding' score of 9/10. Wiiloveit.com awarded the WiiWare download a similar grade, with a 27/30 (or 90%), claiming it's a "great complement to the DS release". Additionally, British publication Official Nintendo Magazine gave the game a 92%.

=== Sales ===
Famitsu reported that by May 2009, WarioWare D.I.Y. sold 156,692 units in Japan.
