= WarioWare: Smooth Moves =

2006 video game

- North American box art
- Developers: Nintendo SPD; Intelligent Systems
- Publisher: Nintendo
- Directors: Goro Abe; Taku Sugioka
- Producers: Yoshio Sakamoto; Ryoichi Kitanishi
- Designer: Yoshio Sakamoto
- Programmer: Taku Sugioka
- Artist: Ko Takeuchi
- Composers: Naoko Mitome; Masanobu Matsunaga; Yasuhisa Baba; Kenichi Nishimaki
- Series: Wario
- Platform: Wii
- Release: JP: December 2, 2006; EU: January 12, 2007; NA: January 15, 2007; AU: January 25, 2007
- Genre: Party
- Modes: Single-player, multiplayer

WarioWare: Smooth Moves (Note: Known in Japan as Odoru Made in Wario (おどるメイド イン ワリオ; lit. "Dancing: Made in Wario")) is a party video game developed by Nintendo and Intelligent Systems and published by Nintendo for the Wii. It was released in Japan in December 2006, and in Europe, North America, and Australia in January 2007. It is the fifth game in the WarioWare series of games, and the only game in the series to be physically released for the Wii (excluding WarioWare D.I.Y. Showcase, another WarioWare game available on WiiWare). Additionally, this was the first spin-off Mario game to be released for the console.

Like its predecessors, WarioWare: Smooth Moves is built around a collection of microgames that last about five seconds each, and which require that the player hold the Wii Remote in specific positions. The game offers the microgames to the player in rapid succession, by first instructing the player to hold the Wii Remote in a specific manner, and then showing them the microgame. The microgames are divided into several stages, each of which loosely connects the microgames with the help of a story.

Smooth Moves received positive reviews from critics and was a commercial success; it was the United States' 4th best-selling game in its debut month of January 2007. In Japan, it sold 63,954 copies in its debut week of November 27 – December 3, 2006, making it the 4th best-selling launch game for the Wii after Wii Sports, Wii Play, and The Legend of Zelda: Twilight Princess.

== Gameplay ==
The player is first told to hold the Wii Remote like a remote control, positioning it straight forward.

Similar to the previous games in the WarioWare series, WarioWare: Smooth Moves is a puzzle game focusing on microgames, which are short games that last for about five seconds. Each microgame requires that the player position the Wii Remote in a specific way, such as holding it vertically, or placing the bottom end of the device against the nose. In each stage, microgames appear consecutively, presenting the player with a simple prompt with which to clear the microgame. Failing a microgame, either by losing the game or running out of time, one of four lives will be deducted, with the stage ending once the player runs out of lives. The player is required to use the Nunchuk attachment for the Wii Remote in certain microgames. Before each microgame begins, the required position for the Wii Remote is shown to the player, to allow them time to position the device. The game is broken up into stages, each represented by a WarioWare character and loosely connected by a story, with the microgames divided among the stages. After the player completes a certain number of microgames, they advance to the boss stage, which is a microgame that is longer and more complex than the others. After the player completes all of the single-player stages, the game unlocks a hotseat multiplayer mode, in which only one Wii Remote is used and shared by up to 12 players. While a player plays a microgame in this mode, other players watch, and after the microgame is completed, the player passes the Wii Remote to the next person.

== Plot ==
A long time ago, a stone Wii Remote called the Form Baton was found by humans and a race of creatures called the Splunks. With it, they could do many things with its forms and the Splunks became their loyal companions with it. As years passed, the Splunks preserve the Form Baton in the Temple of Form. In present-day Diamond City, a Splunk steals all of Wario's food. He chases it all the way to the Temple of Form where he finds the Form Baton. After escaping a boulder, Wario gloats about his newly discovered "treasure".

The rest of the game consists of segments of stories centered around the characters. Mona cheers as a cheerleading captain for the Diamond City football team at Diamond City Stadium, with one of the football players developing a crush on her. Kat and Ana try to defeat an ogre attacking Diamond Dojo, who was only trying to find his missing child. At Park Street, a kung-fu student named Young Cricket tries to get pork buns from Mona to feed himself & his teacher, Master Mantis. Jimmy T. dances with a group of cats at Club Sugar and a cat hands back an umbrella that he lent it earlier. Ashley and Red listen to a talking spell book called Chatty Mr. Spell Book about growing a monster plant after failing to create one. Dribble and Spitz deliver a person to Tomorrow Hill, who is revealed to be an alien. Dr. Crygor's granddaughter, Penny, participates against him in the Invent-Off at Diamond Academy and wins by making a tiny Wario-motorbike. 9-Volt gets upset with 18-Volt for breaking his new Game & Watch and he tries to get another, but the two reconcile soon after. At Club Spice, a doppelganger of Jimmy T. named Jimmy P. dances with a group of dogs in a story similar to Jimmy T.'s and the two meet each other at the end of the segment.

In the final level, Forever Form Baton, Wario receives the motorbike that Penny made at the Invent-Off. Wario accidentally gets sucked into the bike engine while riding it, which ends up turning him into an endless super-swarm of Tiny Warios that are shot out by the engine, which then invade and take over Diamond City. After he comes back together, the Splunks demand that he returns the Form Baton to the temple. Wario refuses and it leads into an open chase around Diamond City, resulting in the chase leading back to the Temple of Form, where Wario accidentally drops it back in its rightful place (it can be presumed that after that, Wario left the Form Baton alone or was thrown out of the temple to ensure that he can't steal it again). The motorbike also stops right in front of the temple. Completing the game unlocks an additional story featuring Orbulon called The Secret of the Balance Stone. In it, his ship gets hit by the Balance Stone, the stone form of the Nunchuk and ends up at the Temple of Form. Orbulon attempts to turn the temple into a ship by using the Form Baton and the Balance Stone together, but ends up with the same results as Wario after the Splunks, still inside the temple, forcibly beat him up into giving them back before they toss him and his ship back to space. After beating that stage, a special level involving Dr. Crygor called The Kelorometer is unlocked, where he and Mike try out a workout machine called the Kelorometer with the player as a test subject.

== Development ==
Nintendo first revealed WarioWare: Smooth Moves for the Wii at the 2006 E3 convention. The game was co-developed by Intelligent Systems and the Software Planning Development department of Nintendo. Development on the game began in late 2005 with a team of 20 people, directed by Goro Abe and produced by Yoshio Sakamoto. Abe first came up with the idea for the game when the Wii Remote was revealed to him. Since the developers believed that holding the controller in only one way limited the game's entertainment value, they decided to introduce new positions and motions to the game for the Remote to be held. The software used to register the Remote's movements was written from scratch because of the unique movements required for the game. Similar to previous games in the WarioWare series, the game's subtitle, "Smooth Moves", was used to represent the basic movement that players perform in the game. The developers wanted players to move as if they were dancing when playing the game, so they decided that Smooth Moves was the best phrase to use to describe the game's actions. Because of its party genre, the developers made the game's multiplayer mode its "best point".

There are about 200 microgames included in WarioWare: Smooth Moves, an amount similar to previous WarioWare titles. Abe determined which microgames were included after each team member wrote down an idea on a piece of paper and sent it to him. The microgames were inspired by "very original, everyday life issues". To offer a different visual style for each minigame, developers were asked to make their own design for the minigame that they were working on. During development, one of the game's basic concepts was to "make a different taste for every single game". The only rule that Abe imposed on the minigame designs was for the developers to make it instantly obvious as to what is happening in the microgames. The Wii Remote's speaker is used in the game to "add a greater sense of feel". For example, in one microgame, the player must bounce a tennis ball on a racquet. When the ball touches the racquet, the Wii Remote's speaker emits a bouncing sound and a rumble to "add a very strong reality to the game". The game mostly forgoes the Wii nunchuk attachment and functions strictly with the Wii Remote. Its visual presentation is similar to WarioWare, Inc.: Mega Party Games! for the GameCube, and it does not run in widescreen mode.

== Reception ==
Reception

Aggregate scores
Aggregator	Score
GameRankings	81.82%
Metacritic	83/100

Review scores
Publication	Score
1Up.com	B+
Computer and Video Games	8.4/10
Eurogamer	7/10
Game Informer	7.75/10
GamePro	4/5
GameSpot	9.1/10
GameSpy	4.5/5
GamesRadar+	4/5
GameTrailers	8.3/10
GameZone	8.1/10
IGN	8.2/10
Nintendo Life	7/10
Nintendo World Report	8.5/10
Official Nintendo Magazine	92%
The Age	4/5
The Courier-Mail	9/10
The Sunday Age	5/5
Toronto Sun	4/5

Smooth Moves was released by Nintendo for the Wii in Japan on December 2, 2006, and in January 2007 for other markets. The game received "generally favorable reviews", receiving aggregated scores of 83 out of 100 from Metacritic and 82% from GameRankings. Praise focused on the game's entertainment value, especially at parties, while criticism targeted its length. WarioWare: Smooth Moves received a ToyAward in the Trend and Lifestyle category from the 2007 Nuremberg International Toy Fair. It was also given the award for Best Action Game at IGN's Wii Best of E3 2006 Awards; the website later named the game their Game of the Month for January 2007. WarioWare: Smooth Moves was the United States' 4th best-selling game in its debut month of January 2007. It dropped to 8th the following month, selling 109,000 units. In Japan, WarioWare: Smooth Moves sold 63,954 copies in its debut week of November 27 – December 3, 2006, making it the 4th best-selling launch game for the Wii after Wii Sports, Wii Play, and The Legend of Zelda: Twilight Princess. It dropped to 20th for the week of December 18–24, 2006. The game received a "Platinum" sales award from the Entertainment and Leisure Software Publishers Association (ELSPA), indicating sales of at least 300,000 copies in the United Kingdom. It was re-released in May 2011, in Europe as part of the Nintendo Selects program. It sold 1.82 million copies overall.

Several reviews praised the game as one of the Wii's best. The Official Nintendo Magazine said that Wario should "now take his place alongside Mario and Link as a true Nintendo great". Appreciating the game's "terrific use of the Wii's unique control features", GameSpot remarked that the game also had "amazing" graphics, concluding that it belongs in the game libraries of Wii owners. This sentiment was shared by GameTrailers, which said that WarioWare: Smooth Moves was "without a doubt" the best collection of minigames for the Wii. GameSpy found that the game had "a lot of value", especially for people who host parties or have groups of friends or family who already enjoy games such as Wii Sports or Rayman Raving Rabbids. Naming WarioWare: Smooth Moves the Game of the Week from January 28 – February 4, 2007, The Observer gave particular praise to the game's graphics, stating that "there are nicely colourful cartoon intros to each level, and the microgames utilise a plethora of visual styles. You'll notice snippets of favourites from yesteryear, whether it be pulling the Master Sword out of the stone in the Nintendo 64's The Legend of Zelda: Ocarina of Time or jumping to collect coins as NES-era Mario". Australia's The Age found the game "as entertaining to watch as it is to play", rating it four stars out of five. The Sunday Age newspaper predicted that WarioWare: Smooth Moves, which is "totally unlike anything else out there", could convert non-gamers into fans of video games.

Computer and Video Games predicted that the game "will be the one you come back to when you've got a full house", and appreciated its "crazy genius" gameplay. Nintendo World Report was pleased with the game's variety, but found the small number of unlockable items and lack of high scores disappointing. Although video game review website IGN noted that the game was not the best in the Wario series of video games, they still considered it an "essential piece of the Wii collection". The website was also entertained by the single-player mode as well as the multiplayer, especially when "shov[ing] the controller off on unsuspecting houseguests or non-gamers months and years down the road". They considered the game's use of the Wii Remote to be "slick and intuitive", the graphics to be "nearly inexplicable", and the sound to be "totally off the wall". GameZone called the game "original and addictive", but noted that it would not appeal to everyone. The Courier-Mail praised the game's use of the Wii's motion-sensitive controllers as one of its best features, which helps push it "over-the-top" as "one of the most inventive games designed for the Wii's interactive controls". Canada's Toronto Sun also appreciated its "novel use" of the Wiimote.

A lack of "eye-popping unpredictability [like] its predecessors" and difficult controller positions disappointed 1UP.com, but the website still called WarioWare: Smooth Moves a "welcome addition to any Wii library". Described as a "certifiably insane party game that is a must buy for any Wii owner", GamePro felt that the game further proves that the Wii is the "must-have" console when playing with friends. GamesRadar shared this sentiment, noting that although the game's single-player mode is only several hours long, its multiplayer mode is the "definite Wii party experience" for up to 12 people. Game Informer felt excited, surprised, and a "little stupid" when waving the Wii remote with the game, concluding that the game will make "friends laugh pretty much non-stop for an hour or two, and that may very well be worth the price of admission". Despite writing positively about how the game utilizes the Wii remote, Eurogamer was disappointed with its weak long-term appeal because "it never really dares to test players".

During the 11th Annual Interactive Achievement Awards, WarioWare: Smooth Moves received a nomination for "Family Game of the Year" by the Academy of Interactive Arts & Sciences.

== Legacy ==
In the Nintendo Direct dated 21 June 2023, a direct sequel, WarioWare: Move It!, was announced.
