= List of Wario video games =

Wario
- Wario's emblem on his hat and gloves is used to represent him in many games.
- Genres: Platformer; Puzzle
- Developers: Nintendo R&D1; Nintendo SPD; Nintendo EAD; Nintendo EPD; Intelligent Systems; Good-Feel; Suzak Inc.; Treasure
- Publisher: Nintendo
- Platforms: Game Boy, Nintendo Entertainment System, Super Nintendo Entertainment System, Virtual Boy, Game Boy Color, Game Boy Advance, GameCube, Nintendo DS, Wii, Nintendo DSi, Wii U, Nintendo 3DS, Nintendo Switch
- First release: Wario Land: Super Mario Land 3; 1994
- Latest release: WarioWare: Move It! 2023
- Parent series: Mario
- Spin-offs: Wario Land; WarioWare

Wario video games have been developed by several companies, including Nintendo, Suzak, Good-Feel, Treasure and Intelligent Systems, for Nintendo video game consoles and handhelds dating from the Game Boy. The first game to feature Wario was Super Mario Land 2: 6 Golden Coins, as the antagonist; Wario Land: Super Mario Land 3 was the first to feature Wario as a playable character.

The Wario series includes platform games in the Wario Land series and a series of microgame-focused titles in the WarioWare series. The changes from the Super Mario Land series, both stylistically and storywise—make the ''Wario Land'' games unique from other platformers in the genre. The WarioWare games are minigame compilations in which the player is required to perform a series of short activities at a quickening pace, with the player having four lives. Wario games also include occasional games of other genres such as Wario's Woods and Mario & Wario.

== Wario platforming games ==
Game	Details
Wario Land: Super Mario Land 3 Original release date(s): JP: January 22, 1994; NA: March 14, 1994; PAL: May 14, 1994	Release years by system: 1994 – Game Boy; 2011 – Nintendo 3DS (VC)
Wario Land: Super Mario Land 3 Original release date(s): JP: January 22, 1994; NA: March 14, 1994; PAL: May 14, 1994	Notes: Developed by Nintendo's Nintendo R&D1 team.; First game to feature Wario as a playable character.; Third game in the Super Mario Land series and the first game in the Wario Land series.; Re-released in Europe under the Game Boy Nintendo Classics brand in 2001.; Re-released on the Nintendo 3DS's Virtual Console service in 2012 for Japan, Europe, and North America.
Virtual Boy Wario Land Original release date(s): JP: December 1, 1995; NA: November 27, 1995	Release years by system: 1995 – Virtual Boy; 2026 – Nintendo Switch (NC)
Virtual Boy Wario Land Original release date(s): JP: December 1, 1995; NA: November 27, 1995	Notes: Developed by Nintendo.; Features gameplay similar to the other Wario Land games.
Wario Land II Original release date(s): JP: October 21, 1998; NA: March 31, 1999; EU: April 25, 1999	Release years by system: 1998 – Game Boy; 1998 – Game Boy Color; 2012 – Nintendo 3DS (VC)
Wario Land II Original release date(s): JP: October 21, 1998; NA: March 31, 1999; EU: April 25, 1999	Notes: Developed by Nintendo.; Includes support for the Super Game Boy peripheral.
Wario Land 3 Original release date(s): JP: March 21, 2000; NA: June 1, 2000; PAL: April 14, 2000	Release years by system: 2000 – Game Boy Color; 2012 – Nintendo 3DS (VC); 2023 – Nintendo Switch (NC)
Wario Land 3 Original release date(s): JP: March 21, 2000; NA: June 1, 2000; PAL: April 14, 2000	Notes: Developed by Nintendo.; More non-linear in structure than previous games in the series.
Wario Land 4 Original release date(s): JP: August 21, 2001; NA: November 18, 2001; PAL: November 16, 2001	Release years by system: 2001 – Game Boy Advance; 2011 – Nintendo 3DS (VC, Ambassador Program exclusive); 2014 – Wii U (VC); 2025 – Nintendo Switch (NC)
Wario Land 4 Original release date(s): JP: August 21, 2001; NA: November 18, 2001; PAL: November 16, 2001	Notes: Developed by Nintendo.
Wario World Original release date(s): JP: May 27, 2004; NA: June 23, 2003; PAL: June 20, 2003	Release years by system: 2003 – GameCube
Wario World Original release date(s): JP: May 27, 2004; NA: June 23, 2003; PAL: June 20, 2003	Notes: Developed by Treasure.; First Wario platform game for a home console.
Wario: Master of Disguise Original release date(s): JP: January 18, 2007; NA: March 5, 2007; EU: June 1, 2007; AU: May 17, 2007	Release years by system: 2007 – Nintendo DS; 2015 – Wii U (VC)
Wario: Master of Disguise Original release date(s): JP: January 18, 2007; NA: March 5, 2007; EU: June 1, 2007; AU: May 17, 2007	Notes: Developed by Suzak.; Fuses puzzles into a Wario platforming setting.
Wario Land: Shake It! Original release date(s): JP: July 24, 2008; NA: September 22, 2008; EU: September 26, 2008; AU: September 25, 2008	Release years by system: 2008 – Wii; 2016 – Wii U
Wario Land: Shake It! Original release date(s): JP: July 24, 2008; NA: September 22, 2008; EU: September 26, 2008; AU: September 25, 2008	Notes: Known as Wario Land: The Shake Dimension in Europe and Australia, Wario Land: Shake It! in North America, and Wario Land: Shake (Note: Japanese: ワリオランド シェイク) in Japan.; 2D platform game; Developed by Good-Feel.; Requires the player to shake the Wii Remote to perform certain actions.

== WarioWare games ==
Game	Details
WarioWare, Inc.: Mega Microgames! Original release date(s): JP: March 21, 2003; NA: May 26, 2003; EU: May 23, 2003	Release years by system: 2003 – Game Boy Advance; 2003 – GameCube; 2011 – Nintendo 3DS (VC, Ambassador Program exclusive); 2014 – Wii U (VC); 2023 – Nintendo Switch (NC)
WarioWare, Inc.: Mega Microgames! Original release date(s): JP: March 21, 2003; NA: May 26, 2003; EU: May 23, 2003	Notes: Known as Made in Wario (Note: Japanese: メイド イン ワリオ) in Japan and WarioWare, Inc.: Minigame Mania in Europe.; Developed by Nintendo.; First game in the WarioWare series.; Consists of a series of minigames presented in a hectic format.; Re-released for the GameCube as Warioware, Inc.: Mega Party Game$! with multiplayer support.
WarioWare: Twisted! Original release date(s): JP: October 14, 2004; NA: May 23, 2005; AU: May 19, 2005	Release years by system: 2004 – Game Boy Advance
WarioWare: Twisted! Original release date(s): JP: October 14, 2004; NA: May 23, 2005; AU: May 19, 2005	Notes: Known as Mawaru Made in Wario (Note: Japanese: まわるメイドインワリオ; lit. Turning Made in Wario) in Japan. Not released in Europe.; Developed by Nintendo.; Uses a rotation sensor in the cartridge to play most of the minigames.
WarioWare: Touched! Original release date(s): JP: December 2, 2004; NA: February 14, 2005; EU: March 11, 2005	Release years by system: 2004 – Nintendo DS; 2015 – Wii U (VC); 2016 – Nintendo 3DS
WarioWare: Touched! Original release date(s): JP: December 2, 2004; NA: February 14, 2005; EU: March 11, 2005	Notes: Known as Sawaru Made In Wario (Note: Japanese: さわる メイドインワリオ; lit. Touching Made in Wario) in Japan.; Co-developed by Intelligent Systems.; Uses the Nintendo DS touch screen for most of the minigames.
WarioWare: Smooth Moves Original release date(s): JP: December 2, 2006; NA: January 15, 2007; EU: January 12, 2007	Release years by system: 2006 – Wii; 2016 – Wii U
WarioWare: Smooth Moves Original release date(s): JP: December 2, 2006; NA: January 15, 2007; EU: January 12, 2007	Notes: Known as Odoru Made in Wario (Note: Japanese: おどるメイド イン ワリオ; lit. Dancing Made in Wario) in Japan.; Co-developed by Intelligent Systems.; Players must hold the Wii Remote in different positions to play the minigames.
WarioWare: Snapped! Original release date(s): JP: December 24, 2008; NA: April 5, 2009; EU: April 3, 2009	Release years by system: 2008 – DSiWare; 2011 – Nintendo 3DS
WarioWare: Snapped! Original release date(s): JP: December 24, 2008; NA: April 5, 2009; EU: April 3, 2009	Notes: Known as Utsusu Made in Wario (Note: Japanese: うつす メイド イン ワリオ; lit. Projecting Made in Wario) in Japan.; Co-developed by Intelligent Systems.; Uses the Nintendo DSi's camera to control the minigames.
WarioWare D.I.Y. Original release date(s): JP: April 29, 2009; NA: March 28, 2010; EU: April 30, 2010	Release years by system: 2009 – Nintendo DS
WarioWare D.I.Y. Original release date(s): JP: April 29, 2009; NA: March 28, 2010; EU: April 30, 2010	Notes: Known as Made in Ore (Note: Japanese: メイド イン 俺; lit. Made in Me) in Japan.; Co-developed by Intelligent Systems.; Allows the user to create their own minigames, music, and comics.
WarioWare D.I.Y. Showcase Original release date(s): JP: April 29, 2009; NA: March 29, 2010; EU: April 30, 2010	Release years by system: 2009 – WiiWare
WarioWare D.I.Y. Showcase Original release date(s): JP: April 29, 2009; NA: March 29, 2010; EU: April 30, 2010	Notes: Known as Asobu Made in Ore (Note: Japanese: あそぶメイドイン俺; lit. Play Made in Me) in Japan.; Co-developed by Intelligent Systems.; Allows the user to import games and content made in WarioWare D.I.Y. for TV play.
Game & Wario Original release date(s): JP: March 28, 2013; NA: June 23, 2013; EU: June 28, 2013	Release years by system: 2013 – Wii U
Game & Wario Original release date(s): JP: March 28, 2013; NA: June 23, 2013; EU: June 28, 2013	Notes: Described as a spiritual successor to the WarioWare series.; Features various games utilizing the Wii U GamePad, including its touchscreen, motion controls and camera.
WarioWare Gold Original release date(s): EU: July 27, 2018; AU: July 28, 2018; JP: August 2, 2018; NA: August 3, 2018	Release years by system: 2018 – Nintendo 3DS
WarioWare Gold Original release date(s): EU: July 27, 2018; AU: July 28, 2018; JP: August 2, 2018; NA: August 3, 2018	Notes: Known as Gorgeous Made in Wario (Note: Japanese: ゴージャス メイド イン ワリオ, Hepburn: lit. Gōjyasu Meido in Wario) in Japan.
WarioWare: Get It Together! Original release date(s): September 10, 2021	Release years by system: 2021 – Nintendo Switch
WarioWare: Get It Together! Original release date(s): September 10, 2021	Notes: Known as Osusowakeru Made in Wario (Note: Japanese: おすそわける メイド イン ワリオ; lit. Share With Others: Made in Wario) in Japan.
WarioWare: Move It! Original release date(s): November 3, 2023	Release years by system: 2023 – Nintendo Switch
WarioWare: Move It! Original release date(s): November 3, 2023	Notes: Known as Chō Odoru Made in Wario (Note: Japanese: 超おどるメイド イン ワリオ; lit. Super Dancing Made in Wario) in Japan.; Direct sequel to WarioWare: Smooth Moves, as shown by its Japanese title and similar English title.

=== Individual microgames ===
Game	Details
Bird & Beans Original release date(s): JP: December 24, 2008; PAL: April 6, 2009; NA: April 3, 2009	Release years by system: 2008 – DSiWare
Bird & Beans Original release date(s): JP: December 24, 2008; PAL: April 6, 2009; NA: April 3, 2009	Notes: Developed by Nintendo.; Known in Europe and Australasia as Pyoro.; Originally found in WarioWare, Inc.: Mega Microgames!, Pyoro that was modified to use both of the Nintendo DS's screens.
Paper Airplane Chase Original release date(s): JP: December 24, 2008; PAL: April 3, 2009; NA: April 27, 2009	Release years by system: 2008 – DSiWare
Paper Airplane Chase Original release date(s): JP: December 24, 2008; PAL: April 3, 2009; NA: April 27, 2009	Notes: Developed by Nintendo.; Known in Europe and Australasia as Paper Plane.; Originally a single microgame with expanded modes that was released for the DSiWare download service.

== Other games ==
Game	Details
Mario & Wario Original release date(s): JP: August 27, 1993	Release years by system: 1993 – Super Nintendo Entertainment System
Mario & Wario Original release date(s): JP: August 27, 1993	Notes: Developed by Game Freak.; Released exclusively in Japan.; Uses the Super Famicom mouse.
Wario's Woods Original release date(s): JP: February 19, 1994; NA: December 10, 1994; PAL: 1995	Release years by system: 1994 – Nintendo Entertainment System, Super Nintendo Entertainment System; 1995 – Satellaview; 2006 – Wii (VC); 2013 – Nintendo 3DS (VC); 2013 – Wii U (VC); 2018 – Nintendo Switch (NC)
Wario's Woods Original release date(s): JP: February 19, 1994; NA: December 10, 1994; PAL: 1995	Notes: Developed by Nintendo.; Last game to be released for the Nintendo Entertainment System.; Features Toad as the protagonist, and Wario as the villain.; Puzzle game in which the player's cursor is Toad.
Wario Blast: Featuring Bomberman! Original release date(s): JP: August 10, 1994; NA: November 1994; PAL: June 29, 1995	Release years by system: 1994 – Game Boy
Wario Blast: Featuring Bomberman! Original release date(s): JP: August 10, 1994; NA: November 1994; PAL: June 29, 1995	Notes: Developed by Hudson Soft.; Originally released as Bomberman GB in Japan, and not featuring Wario in any way. It was altered and re-released as Wario Blast: Featuring Bomberman! in North America and Europe in the hopes that the game would reach a larger audience.
Wario's Woods: Bakushō Version Original release date(s): JP: 1995	Release years by system: 1995 – Satellaview
Wario's Woods: Bakushō Version Original release date(s): JP: 1995	Notes: Featuring a vocal track from the Japanese radio comedy show, Bakushō Mondai.; Re-released in 1997 without the Bakushō Mondai vocal track as Wario no Mori: Futatabi in two different versions (time- and score-attack).
