= Wario Land: Super Mario Land 3 =

1994 video game

- North American box art
- Developer: Nintendo R&D1
- Publisher: Nintendo
- Directors: Hiroji Kiyotake; Takehiko Hosokawa
- Producer: Gunpei Yokoi
- Programmers: Masaru Yamanaka; Yuguru Ozawa; Isao Hirano; Yoshinori Katsuki
- Artists: Hiroji Kiyotake; Takehiko Hosokawa; Kenichi Sugino
- Composers: Ryoji Yoshitomi; Kozue Ishikawa
- Series: Wario Land; Super Mario
- Platform: Game Boy
- Release: JP: January 21, 1994; NA: March 13, 1994; EU: April 28, 1994
- Genre: Platform
- Mode: Single-player

Wario Land: Super Mario Land 3, known in Japan as Super Mario Land 3: Wario Land, (Note: Japanese: スーパーマリオランド3 ワリオランド, Hepburn: Sūpā Mario Rando Surī: Wario Rando) is a 1994 platform game developed and published by Nintendo for the Game Boy. A spin-off of the Mario series, it follows Wario, the antagonist of Super Mario Land 2: 6 Golden Coins (1992), as he travels around an island in an attempt to find the treasures necessary to purchase his own castle. The player traverses through side-scrolling levels, avoiding obstacles and jumping between platforms, while collecting coins and treasure in order to progress.

Wario Land received positive reviews from critics, lauding its length and aesthetic quality, though it garnered mixed opinions on the game's difficulty. It sold more than five million copies and established the Wario series of spin-offs and sequels. The game was re-released for the Nintendo 3DS's Virtual Console in 2012 and for the Nintendo Classics service in 2026.

== Gameplay ==
Wario with the Bull Helmet power-up

Wario Land features gameplay markedly different from the previous two games in the Super Mario Land series. The game takes place on a route through several themed areas, which are split into several courses, culminating in a boss fight. Wario is able to jump on or bump into enemies to knock them over. Enemies thus stunned can be picked up and thrown at other enemies. When in his grown form, Wario is also able to perform a shoulder charge, which is used to attack enemies, break through blocks and open hidden treasure chests.

There are additionally three unique helmets that Wario can obtain, with their own abilities. The Bull Helmet increases Wario's strength and doubles the length of his shoulder charge attack, allowing him to smash through blocks more easily. It also gives Wario the abilities to stick onto ceilings and perform a "butt stomp" into the ground, which stuns nearby enemies and breaks through blocks underneath him. The Jet Helmet increases Wario's running speed and lets him fly in purely horizontal directions in the air, as well as to shoulder charge underwater. Finally, the Dragon Helmet lets Wario shoot long-ranged bursts of flames both on land and underwater, which destroy enemies and blocks on contact. This attack replaces his shoulder charge so long as he wears the Dragon Helmet. Players can also collect a Starman to gain temporary invincibility. If Wario takes damage from an opponent or obstacle, he will shrink, losing his shoulder charge move, and will remain small until he collects a clove of garlic, a helmet, or reaches the end of the level. If Wario is hit while small, runs out of time, or is hit by an instant kill obstacle, such as pits or lava, he will lose a life and all the coins he had collected in that level.

Unlike the Super Mario series, in which coins are typically used to earn extra lives, coins in this game are instead used as currency. They can be earned by collecting them, finding them in blocks, or shoulder charging enemies. If Wario has acquired 10 or more coins in a level, he can pull out a 10-coin piece, which he can throw at enemies, and pick up again if desired. They can also be spent to open level exits, or activate checkpoints. Extra lives are earned by collecting heart points, which are earned by defeating enemies or collecting Hearts, with an extra life earned for every 100 points. At the end of each level, the player can choose to either gamble the coins they have collected in the level in a game of chance, or spend them to try and earn heart points.

Certain levels contain a locked treasure room, each of which contains a unique treasure. To acquire the treasure, the player must find the key in the level, carry it to the treasure room (Wario cannot use helmet abilities or the shoulder charge while carrying the key), break open the treasure chest, take the treasure, and finish the level. Upon finishing the game, each treasure the player has acquired is traded in for a set amount of coins. Even the least valuable treasure is worth roughly as many coins as the player would normally acquire over the entire game. The game's ending varies according to how many total coins the player has.

== Plot ==
After being ejected from Mario's castle in the previous game, Wario resolves to get his own castle, one even bigger and more impressive than Mario's. To fund this extravagant dream, he travels to Kitchen Island, where the Brown Sugar Pirates have hidden many treasures and coins, including a golden statue of Princess Peach, stolen from the Mushroom Kingdom. Wario intends to retrieve this statue and sell it back to Mario for the price of a castle. After exploring the island, stealing the pirates' treasures, and infiltrating their Syrup Castle, Wario confronts the leader of the pirates, a female buccaneer named Captain Syrup. She summons a genie to destroy Wario, but he defeats the genie and Syrup destroys the castle with a large bomb as she escapes. In doing so, the pirates' biggest treasure is revealed: the giant gold statue of Princess Peach. However, Mario appears in a helicopter, thanks Wario and takes the statue away in front of his eyes.

Still holding the genie's lamp, Wario summons the genie and wishes for a castle. The genie tells him that he requires money to grant his wish, and so Wario gives him all the coins the player has collected over the course of the game, plus trades in all the found treasures for more coins. Exactly how well the genie grants Wario's wish depends on the final amount of coins he is given: Wario can get (from best to worst outcome) a European-style castle, a Japanese-style castle, a log cabin, a treehouse, or a tiny birdhouse. If the player collects all the treasures and has enough coins to reach the 99,999 limit, the genie will give Wario an entire planet with his face etched on its surface.

== Release ==
Originally released for the Game Boy on January 21, 1994 in Japan, it was released from March 13 to May 13 in North America and Europe after being delayed from a speculated December 1993 release date. The game was re-released on the Nintendo 3DS's eShop Virtual Console download service in Japan on December 14, 2011, and in 2012 in Europe on February 16, and North America on July 26. The game was added to the Nintendo Classics service on July 8, 2026.

== Reception ==
Reception

Aggregate score
Aggregator	Score
GameRankings	81.00%

Review scores
Publication	Score
Electronic Gaming Monthly	7/10, 7/10, 7/10, 7/10
Famitsu	6/10, 6/10, 6/10, 7/10
GamePro	18.5/20
IGN	7.9/10
Jeuxvideo.com	16/20
Nintendo Life	9/10
Power Unlimited	85%

In the United States, it was the top-selling Game Boy game in March and April 1994. By 1997, 4 million units had been sold worldwide. The game has sold 5.19 million copies worldwide to date.

In Weekly Famicom Tsūshin, the four reviewers gave mixed opinions on whether the game was appropriately difficult or not for an action game. Two reviews felt that Wario moved a bit too slow in the game while another two said it lacked the freshness of the Mario games with one preferring Super Mario Land. The fourth reviewer found the game to be surprisingly fun, and admired small details within the game like the save data being erased with a bomb.

Game Informer's Ben Reeves called it the 13th best Game Boy game and called it the most successful spin-off from the Mario series. In the United Kingdom, it was the top-selling Game Boy game for three months in 1994, from May to July.

GamePro named it the best Game Boy game at the 1994 Consumer Electronics Show, praising the new power-ups and the multiple endings. In their later review, they deemed the game faster, more challenging, and more fun than its hand-held predecessors. They particularly commented that the backgrounds were not as cluttered as in the previous games, making the action easier to follow, that the music was less obtrusive, and that the sprites were better detailed. The four reviewers of Electronic Gaming Monthly gave it a unanimous 7 out of 10, criticizing that the game is too easy but praising the new power-ups and strong graphics. Power Unlimited gave the game a review score of 85%, describing it addictive, long and varied, and called it a worthy successor to the first two Super Mario Land titles.

Pocket Gamer awarded the Virtual Console re-release a 9 out of 10. Nintendo Life similarly awarded the game 9 out of 10, praising the game as one of the best platforming games for the Game Boy system.

== Legacy ==
Wario Land, the sequel to Super Mario Land 2: 6 Golden Coins, was designed to promote Wario to a starring role and expand the Mario universe. Wario Land spawned five popular sequels: Virtual Boy Wario Land, Wario Land II, Wario Land 3, Wario Land 4, and Wario Land: Shake It!. Other Wario titles have been released following the success of Wario Land, including Wario World, Wario: Master of Disguise, and the WarioWare Inc. series.

Several Mario spin-off titles have referenced the original Wario Land. In Mario's Super Picross, Bull Wario, Dragon Wario, and Small Wario appear in the background of the Wario stage selection screens. Subsequently, in Picross 2, Wario is depicted wearing his safari helmet that was introduced in this title. Similarly, Wario's Amiibo board map in Mario Party 10 features his safari helmet as a background element. In Mario Kart 7, Wario's bull transformation appears as a billboard on the Wario Shipyard racetrack. Additionally, the music track of this course is based on the main theme of Wario Land.
