= List of best-selling Game Boy video games =

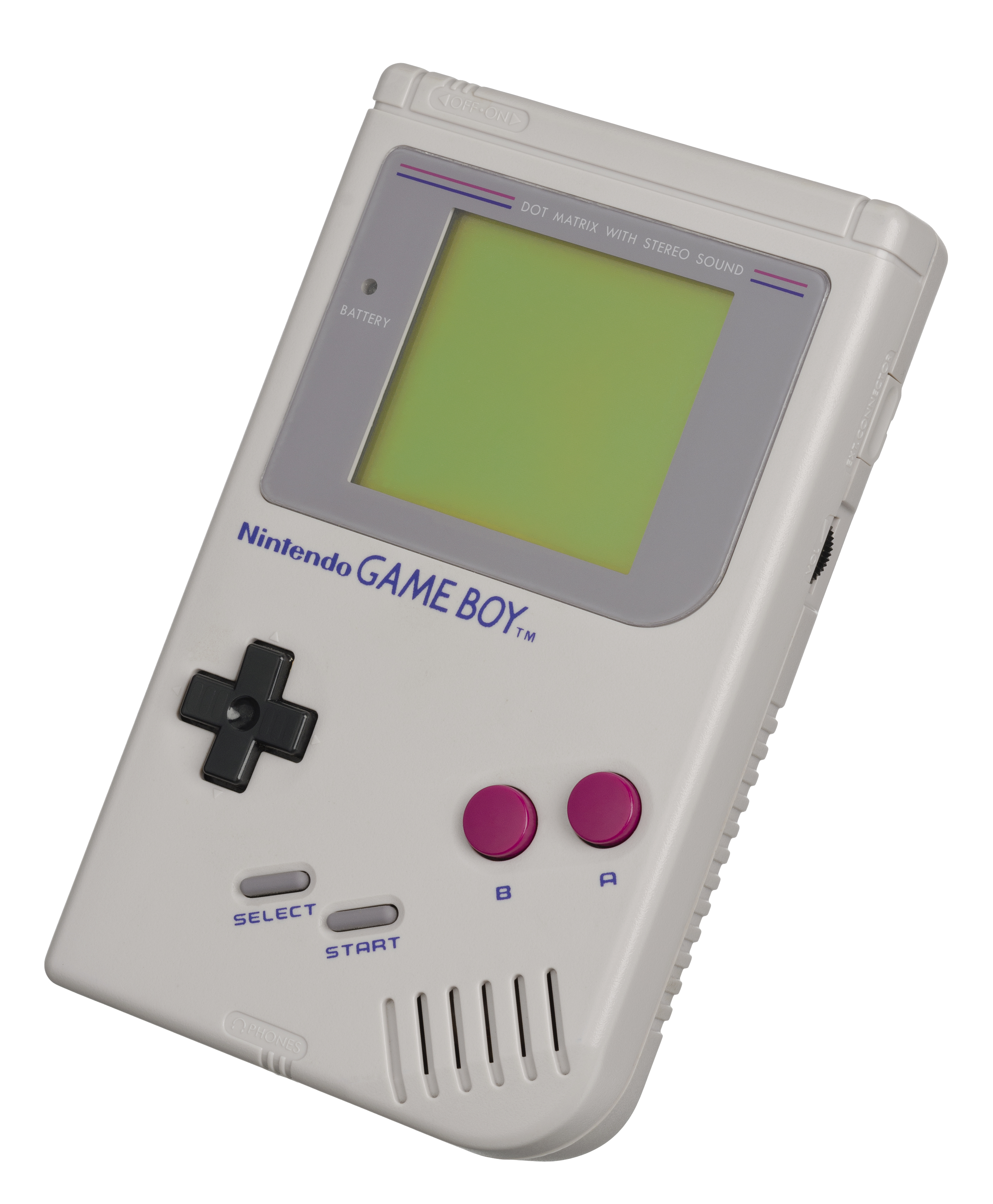
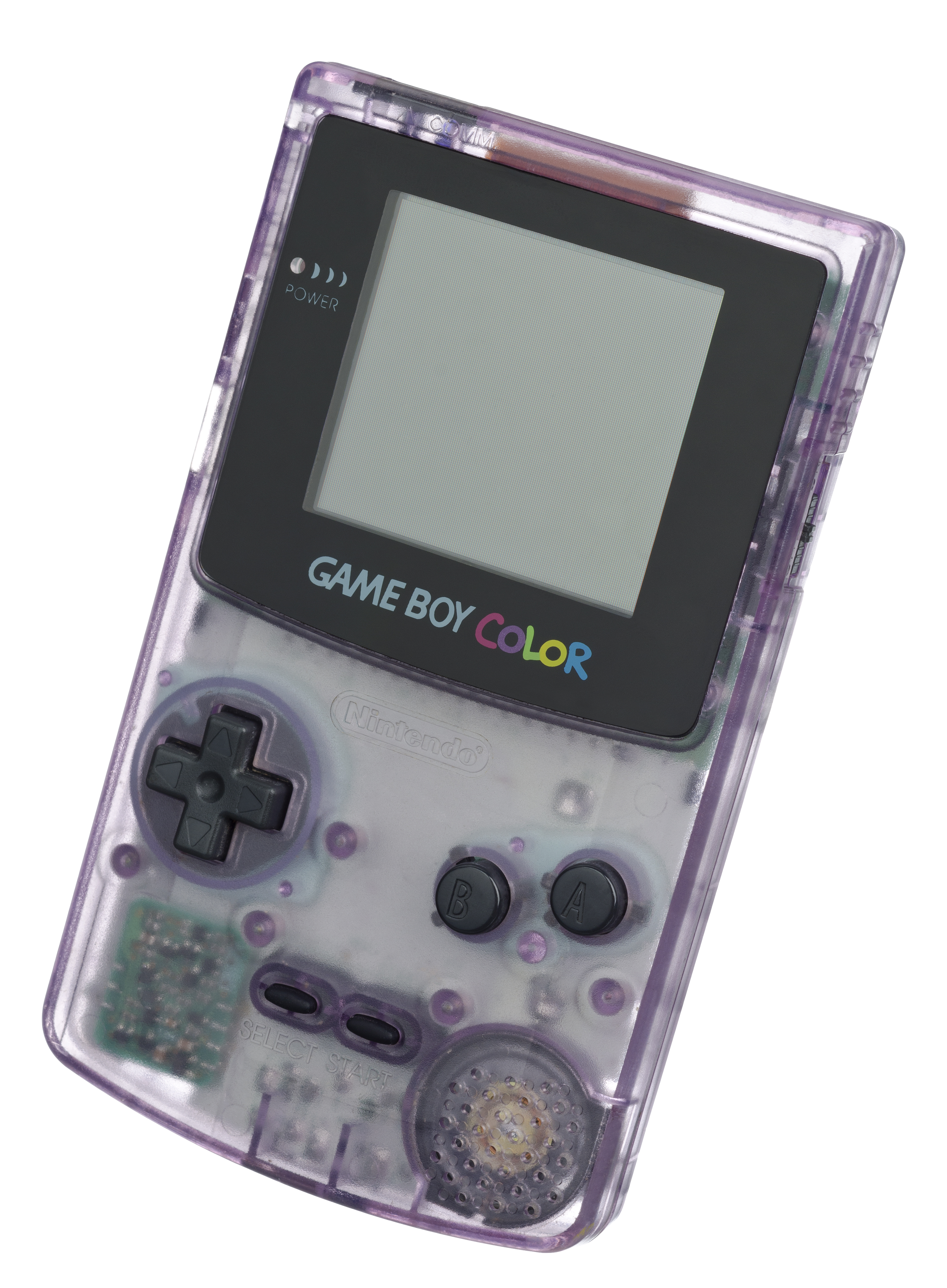
Game Boy (original) and Game Boy Color

This is a list of video games for the Game Boy and Game Boy Color handheld video game consoles that have sold or shipped at least one million copies. It includes games with publicly available sales figures as well as those that received the Player's Choice label for surpassing one million units sold.

The best-selling title is the first generation of Pokémon (Red/Blue and Yellow), released in 1996, with combined sales of approximately 46 million units worldwide. The second best-selling game is Tetris, originally released in Japan on June 14, 1989. Frequently bundled with the Game Boy, over 35 million copies of Tetris were shipped worldwide. It is followed by the best-selling Game Boy Color game, the second generation of Pokémon (Gold/Silver and Crystal), which collectively sold 29 million units. Rounding out the top five are Super Mario Land, the first Super Mario title on the platform, with over 18 million units sold, and Dr. Mario, which surpassed 5.34 million copies. The most successful franchises on the Game Boy and Game Boy Color include Pokémon (84.54 million combined units), Tetris (38.12 million), Super Mario (34.39 million), Donkey Kong (12.55 million), and Kirby (10.91 million).

In total, 67 Game Boy and Game Boy Color games have been confirmed to have sold or shipped at least one million units. Of these, 20 were developed by Nintendo's internal studios. Capcom follows with seven million-selling titles, while Game Freak, Rare, and Tose each have five. Other publishers with multiple million-selling games include Konami (three titles) and both Bandai and Enix (two titles each).

== List ==
Key
†	Game was bundled with Game Boy or Game Boy Color consoles during its lifetime
†	Game is part of a series, total sales listed above

Game	Developer(s) (Note: Only developers and publisher for the original release of each game are listed.)	Publisher	Platform	Release date (Note: Only the initial release date on this platform is listed.)	Sales	Ref.
Pokémon Generation I	Game Freak	Nintendo	GB	February 27, 1996	45,900,000	
Pokémon Red, Green and Blue	Game Freak	Nintendo	GB	February 27, 1996	31,300,000	
Pokémon Yellow	Game Freak	Nintendo	GB	September 12, 1998	14,600,000	
Tetris †	Nintendo R&D1	Nintendo	GB	June 14, 1989	35,000,000	
Pokémon Generation II	Game Freak	Nintendo	GBC	November 21, 1999	30,000,000	
Pokémon Gold and Silver	Game Freak	Nintendo	GBC (Note: Also compatible with the original Game Boy.)	November 21, 1999	23,700,000	
Pokémon Crystal	Game Freak	Nintendo	GBC	December 14, 2000	6,300,000	
Super Mario Land †	Nintendo R&D1	Nintendo	GB	April 21, 1989	18,140,000	
Super Mario Land 2: 6 Golden Coins †	Nintendo R&D1	Nintendo	GB	October 21, 1992	11,180,000	
Dr. Mario	Nintendo R&D1	Nintendo	GB	July 27, 1990	5,340,000	
Pokémon Pinball	HAL Laboratory; Jupiter	Nintendo	GBC	April 14, 1999	5,310,000	
Wario Land: Super Mario Land 3	Nintendo R&D1	Nintendo	GB	January 21, 1994	5,190,000	
Kirby's Dream Land	HAL Laboratory	Nintendo	GB	April 27, 1992	5,130,000	
Super Mario Bros. Deluxe	Nintendo R&D2	Nintendo	GBC	May 1, 1999	5,070,000	
The Legend of Zelda: Oracle of Seasons and Oracle of Ages	Flagship	Nintendo	GBC	February 27, 2001	3,990,000	
Donkey Kong Land	Rare	Nintendo	GB	June 26, 1995	3,910,000	
The Legend of Zelda: Link's Awakening †	Nintendo EAD	Nintendo	GB	June 6, 1993	3,830,000	
Pokémon Trading Card Game	Hudson Soft; Creatures Inc.	Nintendo	GBC	December 18, 1998	3,720,000	
F1 Race	Nintendo R&D1	Nintendo	GB	November 9, 1990	3,410,000	
Yoshi	Game Freak	Nintendo	GB	December 14, 1991	3,120,000	
Donkey Kong	Nintendo EAD; Pax Softnica	Nintendo	GB	June 14, 1994	3,070,000	
Tamagotchi	Tom Create	Bandai	GB	June 27, 1997	3,000,000	
Yu-Gi-Oh! Duel Monsters 4: Battle of Great Duelists	Konami	Konami	GBC	December 7, 2000	2,500,000	
Yu-Gi-Oh! Dark Duel Stories	Konami	Konami	GBC	July 13, 2000	2,396,518	(Note: 726,518 copies sold in Japan. 1.67 million units sold in the United States and Europe.)
Kirby's Dream Land 2	HAL Laboratory	Nintendo	GB	March 21, 1995	2,360,000	
Donkey Kong Land 2	Rare	Nintendo	GB	September 23, 1996	2,350,000	
Dragon Warrior Monsters	Tose	Enix	GBC	September 25, 1998	2,350,000	
The Legend of Zelda: Link's Awakening DX	Nintendo EAD	Nintendo	GBC	December 12, 1998	2,220,000	
Wario Land 3	Nintendo R&D1	Nintendo	GBC	March 21, 2000	2,200,000	
Kirby's Pinball Land	HAL Laboratory	Nintendo	GB	November 27, 1993	2,190,000	
Donkey Kong Country	Rare	Nintendo	GBC	November 4, 2000	2,190,000	
Golf	Nintendo	Nintendo	GB	November 28, 1989	2,120,000	
Tennis	Nintendo R&D1	Nintendo	GB	May 29, 1989	1,990,000	
Alleyway	Nintendo R&D1; Intelligent Systems	Nintendo	GB	April 21, 1989	1,940,000	
Tetris DX	Nintendo R&D1	Nintendo	GBC	October 21, 1998	1,880,000	
Metroid II: Return of Samus	Nintendo R&D1	Nintendo	GB	November 1991	1,720,000	
Baseball	Nintendo R&D1	Nintendo	GB	April 21, 1989	1,610,000	
Yu-Gi-Oh! Duel Monsters	Konami	Konami	GB	December 16, 1998	1,610,000	
Dragon Warrior Monsters 2	Tose	Enix	GBC	March 9, 2001	1,570,000	
Yoshi's Cookie	Bullet-Proof Software	Nintendo	GB	November 21, 1992	1,530,000	
Wario Land II	Nintendo R&D1	Nintendo	GB	March 1, 1998	1,480,000	
Game de Hakken!! Tamagotchi 2	Bandai	Bandai	GB	1997	1,450,000	
Yu-Gi-Oh! Duel Monsters II: Dark Duel Stories	Konami	Konami	GBC	July 8, 1999	1,450,000	
DuckTales	Capcom	Capcom	GB	September 21, 1990	1,430,000	
The Final Fantasy Legend	Square	Square	GB	December 15, 1989	1,370,000	
Yakuman	Intelligent Systems	Nintendo	GB	April 21, 1989	1,280,000	
Tetris 2	Nintendo R&D1; Tose	Nintendo	GB	December 1993	1,240,000	
Kirby Tilt 'n' Tumble	Nintendo R&D2	Nintendo	GBC	August 23, 2000	1,230,000	
Game & Watch Gallery 2	Tose	Nintendo	GBC	September 27, 1997	1,220,000	
Game & Watch Gallery 3	Tose	Nintendo	GBC	April 8, 1999	1,220,000	
Solar Striker	Minakuchi Engineering	Nintendo	GB	January 26, 1990	1,200,000	
Mario Tennis	Camelot Software Planning	Nintendo	GBC	November 1, 2000	1,180,000	
Qix	Minakuchi Engineering	Nintendo	GB	April 13, 1990	1,150,000	
Super R.C. Pro-Am	Rare	Nintendo	GB	June 1991	1,140,000	
Donkey Kong Land III	Rare	Nintendo	GB	October 27, 1997	1,030,000	
The Bugs Bunny Crazy Castle	Kemco	Kemco	GB	September 5, 1989	1,000,000	
The Bugs Bunny Crazy Castle 2	Kemco	Kemco	GB	April 26, 1991	1,000,000	
Mickey's Dangerous Chase	Now Production	Capcom	GB	May 15, 1991	1,000,000	
The Little Mermaid	Capcom	Capcom	GB	July 19, 1991	1,000,000	
Mega Man: Dr. Wily's Revenge	Minakuchi Engineering	Capcom	GB	July 26, 1991	1,000,000	
Mega Man II	Japan System House	Capcom	GB	December 20, 1991	1,000,000	
Wave Race	Nintendo EAD; Pax Softnica	Nintendo	GB	July 1, 1992	1,000,000	
Star Wars	NMS Software	Capcom	GB	November 1992	1,000,000	
DuckTales 2	Make Software	Capcom	GB	April 23, 1993	1,000,000	
Mortal Kombat	Probe Software	Acclaim	GB	September 13, 1993	1,000,000	
Mickey Mouse: Magic Wands!	Kemco	Kemco	GB	December 22, 1993	1,000,000	
Space Invaders	Taito	Nintendo	GB	1994	1,000,000	
The Smurfs	Bit Managers	Infogrames	GB	1994	1,000,000	
Street Fighter II	Sun L	Nintendo	GB	August 11, 1995	1,000,000	
Game & Watch Gallery	Tose	Nintendo	GB	February 1, 1997	1,000,000	
James Bond 007	Saffire	Nintendo	GB	January 29, 1998	1,000,000	

== See also ==
- List of best-selling Nintendo video games
