= Hiroji Kiyotake =

Japanese game designer

Hiroji Kiyotake 清武 博二
- Born: December 21, 1960 (age 65); Kagoshima Prefecture, Japan
- Education: Kyoto Seika University
- Occupations: Game designer, developer
- Employer: Nintendo (1983–present)
- Known for: Metroid series; Wario Land series

Hiroji Kiyotake (清武 博二, Kiyotake Hiroji), born December 21, 1960, in Kagoshima Prefecture, Japan) is a game designer for Nintendo and has been a part of the history of Nintendo since 1983.

== Education ==
Kiyotake graduated from Kyoto Seika University with a BA of Visual Design and was part of the rugby club.

== Career ==
Kiyotake started his employment at Nintendo in 1983, working in the Nintendo Research & Development 1 and Product Engineering Departments, and is currently a member of the Planning and Development Department.

== Game design ==
=== Metroid ===
Hiroji was a designer for Metroid, which was originally designed for the Famicom Disk System. Hiroji is the character designer of Samus Aran and named the Metroid character after Pelé, but he later found out that Pelé's full name was Edson Arantes do Nascimento, not Samus Arantes. Hiroji and Yoshio Sakamoto and the rest of the team decided at the end of Metroid to reveal that Samus was a female character, making Samus Aran one of the first female protagonists in a video game.

=== Wario series ===
Wario emblem

Kiyotake is the original designer of Mario's rival Wario and one of the key people in the Wario series. Kiyotake and Takehiko Hosokawa were the directors and graphic designers of Super Mario Land 2: 6 Golden Coins and Wario Land: Super Mario Land 3. For Virtual Boy Wario Land, he acted as a director, and for Wario games released after Wario Land 4, his role is mostly limited to the Wario design and advising, according to the staff credits of the respective games. During the development of Wario: Master of Disguise, Kiyotake supervised the numerous forms of disguised Wario designed by SUZAK.

== Games ==
Year	Title	Role
1983	Pinball (Game & Watch)	Graphic Designer
1984	Bassmate Computer	Designer
1984	Duck Hunt	Graphic designer
1984	Wrecking Crew	Graphic designer
1986	Metroid	Character designer
1986	Kid Icarus	Assistant
1988	Famicom Wars	Graphic designer
1989	Tennis (Game Boy)	Graphic designer
1990	Dr. Mario	Graphic designer
1991	Metroid II: Return of Samus	Director, graphic designer
1992	Super Mario Land 2: 6 Golden Coins	Director, graphic designer
1994	Wario Land: Super Mario Land 3	Director, graphic designer
1994	Wario Blast	Graphic designer
1994	Wario Blast: Featuring Bomberman!	Graphic designer
1995	Virtual Boy Wario Land	Director
1997	Excitebike: Bun Bun Mario Battle Stadium	Technical Support
1998	Wario Land 2	Character Designer
1998	Tetris DX	Director
2000	Wario Land 3	Graphic designer
2001	Wario Land 4	Graphic designer
2003	Wario World	Advisor
2007	Wario: Master of Disguise	Wario supervisor
2007	Zekkyō Senshi Sakeburein	Supervisor
2010	Metroid: Other M	Concept Art

== Interviews ==
- Super Mario Land 2 - 1992 Developer Interview (Shmuplations)
- Nintendo Dream: Famicom Disk System
- Metroid Developer Interview - NES Classic Edition
