= Wario: Master of Disguise =

2007 video game

- European cover art
- Developer: Suzak
- Publisher: Nintendo
- Directors: Yutaka Hirata; Azusa Tajima; Akira Kinashi
- Producers: Masahiro Yonezawa; Hitoshi Yamagami
- Designers: Daisuke Ike; Koji Watanabe; Yutaka Hirata
- Writers: Saiko Takahori; Daisuke Ike
- Composer: Kenji Hikita
- Series: Wario
- Platform: Nintendo DS
- Release: JP: January 18, 2007; NA: March 5, 2007; AU: May 17, 2007; EU: June 1, 2007
- Genres: Platform, Metroidvania
- Mode: Single-player

Wario: Master of Disguise (Note: Known in Japan as Phantom Thief Wario the Seven (怪盗ワリオ・ザ・セブン, Kaitō Wario the Seven)) is a 2007 platform game developed by Suzak and published by Nintendo for the Nintendo DS. Its Japanese title, Phantom Thief Wario the Seven, refers to the fact that he has seven "forms" (other than his normal "Thief" form). The game was released on the Wii U's Virtual Console in PAL regions and Japan in 2015 and North America in 2016. The game received mixed reviews from critics, with the touchscreen controls and minigames receiving the most criticism.

== Gameplay ==
Wario: Master of Disguise has the player access new areas of the map after unlocking new items and abilities, similar to a metroidvania. The player maneuvers Wario with either the directional pad or the A, B, X and Y buttons. All other actions are controlled by the touch-screen. To advance through levels, the player is required to take advantage of various different forms of Wario. Like Wario Land 4, Wario: Master of Disguise features health as opposed to the invulnerability found in Wario Land II and 3.

== Plot ==
This game starts out with Wario sitting back in his house, watching television. As he flips through the channels, he comes upon a show about a thief, Silver Zephyr, who can wield various disguises. Jealous of this character, Wario quickly creates the Telmet, a helmet that allows him to enter the TV show. He steals the thief's disguise changing wand, Goodstyle, and starts looting the ocean liner that the Silver Zephyr had been about to clear out. The Silver Zephyr, now known as his regular identity, Count Cannoli, gives chase, and eventually catches up with Wario, only to be defeated. He attempts to make a deal with Wario, in an attempt to retrieve Goodstyle, but then breaks the pact when he discovers that a piece of the Wishstone, an ancient tablet that supposedly grants wishes, is being carried by the ship. Wario gets to it first, and decides to track down the rest of the five pieces. Later in some ice caves, he meets a third thief named Carpaccio who is also seeking the Wishstone.

Before entering a volcano, Wario meets a girl named Tiaramisu who really is a demon named Terrormisu sealed inside the Wishstone, but she acts like an ally at first, even helping Wario defeat a boss. In the final episode, Wario finds out about her real nature and defeats her with help from Cannoli and Carpaccio. Finally, Wario finds out that Goodstyle is actually the first of all the count Cannolis. Goodstyle grants Wario's wish for all the treasures the Cannoli clan have. But when he leaves the show, Wario does not find the money and treasures because the Telmet only teleported him out. Wario then resolves to re-enter the television to get them back. What happens afterward is never revealed.

== Reception ==
Reception

Aggregate scores
Aggregator	Score
GameRankings	62.41%
Metacritic	60/100

Review scores
Publication	Score
1Up.com	4/10
Edge	4/10
Eurogamer	4/10
Game Informer	7.25/10
GameSpot	6.1/10
GamesTM	4/10
GameTrailers	6/10
IGN	6/10
Jeuxvideo.com	13/20
Nintendo Life	3/10
Nintendo Power	6.5/10
Nintendo World Report	5/10
Official Nintendo Magazine	68%

Wario: Master of Disguise has received mixed responses among critics. A GameSpot reviewer opined that while it is a passable puzzler, it lacks polish, and the touch screen controls were not very necessary, and thus gave it a 6.1.

According to Craig Harris of IGN, the game has an "uncomfortably strange" story and plays more like a third-party game rather than a first-party due to "its clunky and inconsistent gameplay but also in its inconsistent visual style." However he praised the levels saying they have "some creative moments that add a bit of challenge and variety" though criticised the minigames, saying they were "terribly uncreative."

Mathew Kumar of Eurogamer gave the game a 4/10, criticising the controls for being "unsuitable" for the level design as well as the prominent use of touch screen. He also criticised the pacing and dialogue of the game observing, "the plot drags on for an interminable amount of time during levels, with characters waffling on (and on) about their motivation, or making very weak fart jokes. Even Wario's stolen wand won't shut up! You can, at least, skip the majority of these scenes, but as in some cases you require information from them to solve puzzles, you really do have to sit through them." and concluded, "Despite some obvious effort, Wario: Master of Disguise is just utterly tedious in every respect and an absolute chore to play."

Jon Wahlgren of Nintendo Life gave a negative review on the game, giving it a 3/10 rating. He ridiculed its visuals, saying it is "a fairly ugly game and lacks much of the charm of the Wario Land series. Wario himself and his various guises are appealing enough, but the environments are generic, bland and just plain boring to look at." He further claimed "The whole production just feels cheap and makes you wonder how in the world this game was published by Nintendo." and concluded "Master of Disguise is a victim of focusing too heavily on the DS's feature set. It tries too hard to be a touchscreen showpiece and in the meantime forgets to make the platforming fun. What we're left with feels like a half-baked minigame collection with an underwhelming game taped to it, all marred terribly by poor controls."

The Official Nintendo Magazine gave a score of 68%, stating it had "Inaccurate touch-screen controls, repetitive mini-games and endless cut-scenes hamper otherwise enjoyable disguise-switching antics." and that it was a game for hardcore Wario fans only.
