= Wario World =

2003 video game

- North American box art
- Developer: Treasure
- Publisher: Nintendo
- Directors: Kouichi Kimura; Hitoshi Yamagami
- Producers: Takehiro Izushi; Masato Maegawa
- Programmers: Yoshiyuki Matsumoto; Kanta Watanabe; Yuji Yamanaka; Tahei Katagai; Yusuke Asai
- Composers: Norio Hanzawa; Minako Hamano
- Series: Wario
- Platform: GameCube
- Release: EU: June 20, 2003; NA: June 23, 2003; AU: July 10, 2003; JP: May 27, 2004
- Genres: Platform, beat 'em up
- Mode: Single-player

Wario World (Note: Japanese: ワリオワールド, Hepburn: Wario Wārudo) is a 2003 platform game developed by Treasure and published by Nintendo for the GameCube. The player controls Wario as he attempts to regain his treasure and castle from the evil sentient gem, Black Jewel. The gameplay sees Wario progressing through a series of 3D linear levels in a bid to find collectibles and defeat enemies in order to progress.

The game received mixed reception from critics, who praised the game's gameplay while criticizing its short length. It was a commercial success, selling over 142,000 copies in Japan and over 256,000 copies in the United States. In 2004, it was re-released as a Player's Choice title, and on the Nintendo Switch 2 via the Nintendo Classics service in December 2025.

== Gameplay ==
Wario about to throw an enemy at a group of foes. He can also spin the enemy around him or piledrive them.

Wario World is a 3D platformer with an emphasis on exaggerated combat. The player, controlling Wario, attempts to reclaim his treasure trove and newly built castle from an evil sentient gem named Black Jewel. To accomplish this, Wario traverses linear levels containing enemies and obstacles alongside collectibles, such as Spritelings, and coins which can be collected to help further progression. Each level also holds trapdoors which, when found, lead to either a platforming or puzzle-oriented challenge. These challenges help in obtaining more treasures, a type of collectible that when all obtained unlock minigames from the Game Boy Advance title WarioWare, Inc.: Mega Microgames! which can be played by using the GameCube – Game Boy Advance link cable.

Wario can attack enemies in a variety of ways. Alongside basic punches, Wario can grab enemies and either spin them around, throw them, or piledrive them into the ground. Wario can also grab certain items from the environment, allowing him to deal more damage and have a wider range in his attacks. If Wario is hit by an enemy, he loses a heart from his health bar. When all of Wario's hearts are depleted the player loses coins; when all coins are lost the game is over. Wario can obtain more hearts by collecting pieces of golden statues resembling himself.

== Plot ==
The game begins with Wario enjoying his newly built castle, which is filled with treasures that he has collected from earlier adventures. An evil, sentient gem called Black Jewel, hidden amongst Wario's treasure collection, suddenly awakens and takes over the castle. Black Jewel turns Wario's treasure into monsters, and transforms the castle into four worlds. Wario proceeds through the worlds controlled by Black Jewel, recovering his treasure and rescuing Spritelings (the creatures that had sealed Black Jewel away in the past), then engages Black Jewel in a battle to destroy it. As thanks for his help, the Spritelings build Wario a new castle. Depending on how many Spritelings Wario rescued, his new castle can range from a simple camping tent to a castle that is more majestic than his previous one.

== Development and release ==
Wario World was shown at E3 2002 as a technical demo. At the next E3 in 2003, it was shown with levels of gameplay polish and tweaking, which the previous E3 demo was lacking. On August 22, 2002, at Nintendo's Gamer's Summit, Wario World's North American release date was set to November 11, 2002. The game's release date was pushed back to May 26, 2003, but was further delayed again by one month until June 23, 2003. The game was released in Europe on June 20, in Australia on July 10, and in Japan the following year on May 27, 2004.

It was uncertain who was developing Wario World, until April 22, 2003, when Nintendo of America revealed that Treasure was developing the game. After the successful development collaboration Treasure and Nintendo shared with the Nintendo 64 title, Sin and Punishment, the two companies wanted to work together again. The R&D1 team wanted to continue their co-development juncture with a 3D installment of the Wario franchise. Wario World's music was composed by Norio Hanzawa and Minako Hamano. Wario was voiced by Charles Martinet, who also voices Mario and Luigi in the Mario series.

== Reception ==
Reception

Aggregate scores
Aggregator	Score
GameRankings	71.24%
Metacritic	71/100

Review scores
Publication	Score
1Up.com	B+
Electronic Gaming Monthly	7.5/10
Eurogamer	7/10
Game Informer	8.5/10
GameSpot	6.4/10
GameSpy	3/5
IGN	7.1/10
Nintendo World Report	6/10
X-Play	3/5

Wario World was a commercial success, selling over 142,000 copies in Japan and 256,000 copies in the US. In 2004, the game was re-released alongside Mario Golf: Toadstool Tour and F-Zero GX as part of the Player's Choice line, a selection of games with high sales sold for a reduced price.

Wario World received "mixed or average" reviews, according to review aggregator website Metacritic. The US version of Play magazine gave the game a perfect score, and the reviewer commented that Wario World "pays off every second [he is] holding the controller, and that, to [him], is greatness". Nintendo Power said that the game was "tons of fun". GamePro stated that Wario World "stays addictive by weight of sheer design innovation". The American-based publication Game Informer praised the game for including "droves of awesome boss battles". Matt Casamassina of IGN declared that Wario World had "some great control mechanics and inventive level work". Electronic Gaming Monthly's Greg Ford said, "Wario [World] delivers a great time while it lasts and is well worth checking out. Just don't expect a Mario-quality adventure". Worthplaying gave the game 9 out of 10, stating that "Treasure has done itself proud with this title, and Wario himself can lift his head up high. At least in my book, he's got at least one game that's better than Mario's."

Wario World received criticism for its length, with some reviewers stating that the game was shorter than the average console title. Tom Bramwell of Eurogamer compared Wario World to Luigi's Mansion, a game also criticized for its length, and said that the game was like Luigi's Mansion "all over again". GameSpy stated that Wario World "offers little above and beyond the standard 3D platform romp, and what is offered turns out to be very short and repetitive". GameSpot commented that "the final product is too short and simplistic to hold your attention for more than a day".
