= Super Mario Land =

1989 video game

- North American box art
- Developer: Nintendo R&D1
- Publisher: Nintendo
- Director: Satoru Okada
- Producer: Gunpei Yokoi
- Designer: Hirofumi Matsuoka
- Programmers: Takahiro Harada; Masao Yamamoto
- Artists: Hirofumi Matsuoka; Masahiko Mashimo
- Composer: Hirokazu Tanaka
- Series: Super Mario
- Platform: Game Boy
- Release: JP: April 21, 1989; NA: July 31, 1989; EU: September 1990; AU: 1990
- Genre: Platform
- Mode: Single-player

Super Mario Land (Note: Japanese: スーパーマリオランド) is a 1989 platform game developed and published by Nintendo for the Game Boy, as one of four launch titles for the console. It was first released in Japan in April 1989, followed by North America in August of that year, and Europe and Australia in 1990. It is the first handheld entry in the Super Mario series, as well as the first mainline title not designed by series creator Shigeru Miyamoto. Modeled after the original Super Mario Bros. (1985), the game adapts side-scrolling gameplay for the Game Boy's smaller screen, with the player guiding Mario through 12 levels to rescue Princess Daisy (in her debut appearance) from the alien Tatanga in the new setting of Sarasaland.

The game is notable for its distinctive sound effects, minimalist line-art visuals, inconsistent use of familiar Mario elements, and the inclusion of shooting stages inspired by titles such as Gradius. Nintendo developed Super Mario Land under the direction of Game Boy creators Gunpei Yokoi and Satoru Okada, intending it to be the system's pack-in game. However, during development, Tetris captured their attention, and they recognized its potential for a handheld platform. Henk Rogers, who held the rights to Tetris, convinced Nintendo of America that it would appeal to a broader audience than Super Mario Land; as a result, Tetris was bundled with the Game Boy instead.

Super Mario Land played a key role in the Game Boy's commercial success, selling over 25 million copies worldwide and becoming the fourth best-selling title for the system. Despite its short length, critics praised the game for successfully adapting the Mario formula to portable hardware. Since its release, Super Mario Land has been widely recognized as one of the most influential Game Boy titles, and introduced Princess Daisy as a recurring character in the Mario franchise. The game received two sequels: Super Mario Land 2: 6 Golden Coins (1992) and Wario Land: Super Mario Land 3 (1994), the latter of which spawned the Wario Land sub-series. Super Mario Land was later re-released via the Virtual Console for the Nintendo 3DS in 2011 and on Nintendo Switch Online in 2024.

== Gameplay ==
Mario standing atop a platform in World 3-1, with four moai heads in the background

As a side-scrolling platform game, Super Mario Land is similar in gameplay to the original Super Mario Bros. (1985). As Mario, the player advances to the end of the level by moving to the right and jumping across platforms to avoid enemies and pitfalls, the screen only scrolls to the right, as the player advances, but will not scroll back to the left, and sections of a level that have passed off screen cannot be revisited. Mario travels to Sarasaland to save Princess Daisy from Tatanga, an evil spaceman. Two of the game's twelve levels are "forced-scrolling" Gradius-style shooters where Mario helms a submarine or airplane and fires projectiles towards oncoming enemies, destructible blocks and bosses. Levels end with a platforming challenge to reach an alternative exit located above the regular exit, the former leading to a bonus minigame styled after a Ghost Leg lottery that awards 1 to 3 extra lives or a Superball Flower power-up.

Unlike other games in the series, Super Mario Land features several differences that sets it apart from the traditional Super Mario premises. Rather than being set in the Mushroom Kingdom, it is set in Sarasaland and drawn in line art. Mario rescues Princess Daisy in her debut, rather than the series' standard damsel in distress Princess Peach. When jumped on, Koopa Troopa shells explode after a short delay, Mario throws black bouncing balls rather than fireballs (referred to as "Superballs" in the manual), 1-Up power-ups are depicted as hearts, and the level-end flagpoles are replaced with a platforming challenge. Compared to Super Mario Bros., which contains 32 levels subdivided into 8 "worlds" with 4 levels each, Super Mario Land is substantially smaller, with 12 levels subdivided into 4 "worlds" with 3 levels each. There are five unique bosses, one at the end of each of the four worlds, and a fifth and final boss being Tatanga, who appears when the fourth boss is defeated. The first three bosses may be destroyed with projectiles, or the player may move past them to the exit without destroying them first; the last level has no regular exit, and the two bosses at the end of that level must be destroyed with projectiles to complete the level and the game.

A few elements recur from the previous Mario games, such as blocks suspended in midair, moving platforms that must be used to traverse pitfalls, pipes that lead to other areas, collectible coins that grant an extra life when 100 are collected, and Goomba enemies. After the player has completed the game they may play through again on a harder mode, in which the levels are the same apart from enemies being more numerous; if the player completes the harder mode, the game allows the player to start another play on any level in the game.

== Development and release ==
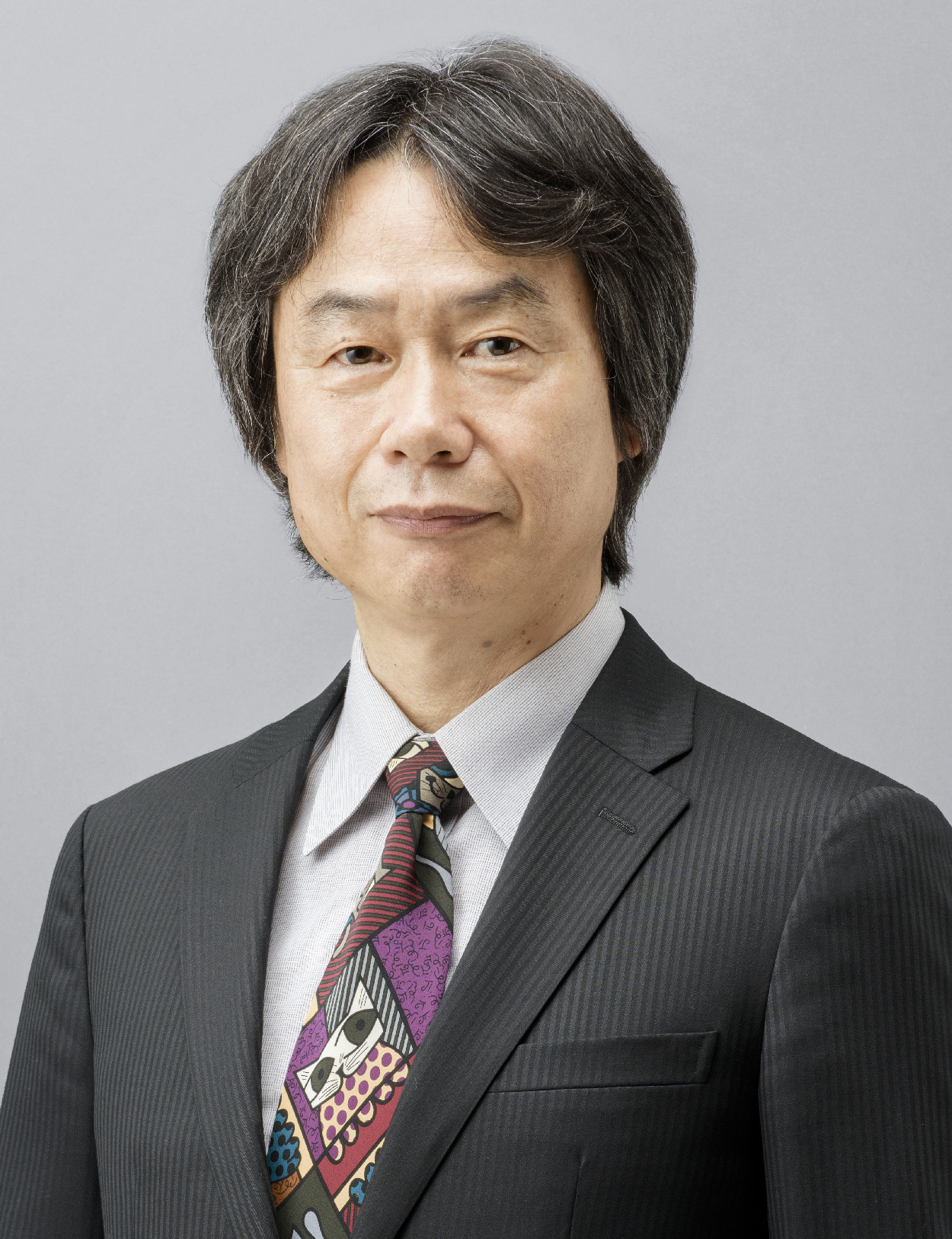
Mario creator Shigeru Miyamoto (pictured 2015) was "famously hands-off" in the development of Super Mario Land.

Development of Super Mario Land began in the second half of 1988 and lasted between six to nine months. It was developed by Nintendo R&D1 and published by Nintendo as a launch game for its Game Boy handheld console. Nintendo CEO Hiroshi Yamauchi believed that fun games promote console sales, so when the company created the Game Boy, he wanted a fun game featuring Nintendo's mascot, Mario. The task came to Nintendo R&D1, a development team led by Game Boy inventor Gunpei Yokoi. Yokoi had previously created the Game & Watch series and worked with his protégé, Shigeru Miyamoto, on the game that introduced Mario, Donkey Kong (1981). Super Mario Land is the fourth Super Mario game, the first portable Mario game, and the first in the series to be made without Miyamoto.

Absent Miyamoto's direction, the development team used elements new and inconsistent with the series as Super Mario Land shrunk elements of the series to fit the portable device's small screen. Yokoi, the head of R&D1, served as producer, and Satoru Okada served as director. They had previously developed Metroid (1986) and Kid Icarus (1986) together, and the two subsequently designed the Game Boy—Yokoi on its industrial design, and Okada on its engineering. Their Super Mario Land was planned as the portable console's showcase title until Henk Rogers brought Tetris to Nintendo of America and convinced Minoru Arakawa that the addictive computer game would help Nintendo reach the largest audience. The company subsequently chose to bundle Tetris with every Game Boy purchase.

The Game Boy was released in Japan in April 1989, North America in July, and Europe in September 1990, and Super Mario Land became a launch game. Its official first release was on April 21, 1989, in Japan, and its North American release followed on August 1. On June 6, 2011, Super Mario Land was released for the Nintendo 3DS's Virtual Console as one of the first titles for the service. Its new features include an increased size (about 60 percent zoom) and an optional "shades of green" color palette to match the effect of the original Game Boy's monochrome. The game was re-released on the Nintendo Classics service for Nintendo Switch on May 15, 2024.

== Reception ==
=== Contemporary reviews ===
Contemporary reception

Review scores
Publication	Score
Computer and Video Games	93%
Electronic Gaming Monthly	8/10, 8/10, 7/10, 8/10
Famitsu	6/10, 7/10, 7/10, 6/10
Player One	98%
The Games Machine (UK)	94%
Mean Machines	90%

Many critics saw Super Mario Land as a "smaller" and shorter version of Super Mario Bros. At the time of its release in 1989, reviewers were excited to have a portable Mario game. Paul Rand of Computer and Video Games called the game "an arcade machine in your pocket" and the graphics "remarkable" for their size. French games magazine Player One said that Super Mario Land adequately compromised where necessary to bring Mario to a portable device. Electronic Gaming Monthly's Steve Harris considered the game "fantastic" and "very fun to play", though short. Ed Semrad and Donn Nauert of the same outlet both declared Super Mario Land "easily the best Game Boy cart" of the time. One reviewer in Famitsu wrote that it was the best of the Game Boy's early titles.

Tony Mott of Superplay said the game proved that Nintendo's Game Boy "had playability to match" its competitors. Matt Regan of Mean Machines agreed: "Playability to the nth degree!". British magazines Mean Machines and The Games Machine both commented on the many secrets to find. Player One too complimented the music. Player One further pronounced Super Mario Land a "masterpiece", "the pinnacle of portable video gaming". Three reviewers in Famitsu were not enthusiastic about the graphics, describing them as blurry, less appealing than the Famicom Mario games as it was monochrome. One reviewer felt that although the game was short, it was probably better that way due to the nature of the Game Boy.

=== Retrospective reviews ===
Retrospective reception

Aggregate score
Aggregator	Score
GameRankings	77.94% (8 reviews)

Review scores
Publication	Score
AllGame	GB: 4/5
Eurogamer	3DS: 7/10
IGN	3DS: 7.5/10
Nintendo Life	3DS: 7/10

IGN's Lucas Thomas wrote that the protagonist, enemies, and overall game were shorter, and noted that Mario himself was just 12 pixels in height on the Game Boy's small screen. With this in mind, Thomas was concerned about player "eyestrain" in rereleases of the game. Still, IGN's Levi Buchanan thought the game made no compromises in its size reduction. Complex's Gus Turner wrote that the graphics were "simple", and Official Nintendo Magazine said the game was "ridiculously short". Eurogamer reported that the game could be finished in under an hour. Reviewing the original Game Boy game, Brett Alan Weiss of AllGame said that similarly found the easy to beat despite a lack of save points and the graphics were too small even for a Game Boy title while finding the gameplay "fittingly super."

Complex's Gus Turner wrote that the game had the fun, intuitiveness, and difficulty associated with the series. Eurogamer's Chris Schilling called Hirokazu Tanaka's soundtrack "surely one of the all-time greats", and Official Nintendo Magazine said it was among the "greatest videogame music ever composed". Eurogamer and Complex too complimented the music.

=== Sales ===
Following the Game Boy's "overnight success", Super Mario Land became the second best-selling 1989 release in North America (behind the bundled Tetris). In the United States, the game topped Babbage's Game Boy sales charts for two months in 1992, from August to September.

Super Mario Land went on to sell more than 25 million copies, making it the fourth best-selling game on the console. The game also outsold Super Mario Bros. 3 (1988), the best-selling stand-alone (non-bundled) game on the NES home console.

== Legacy ==
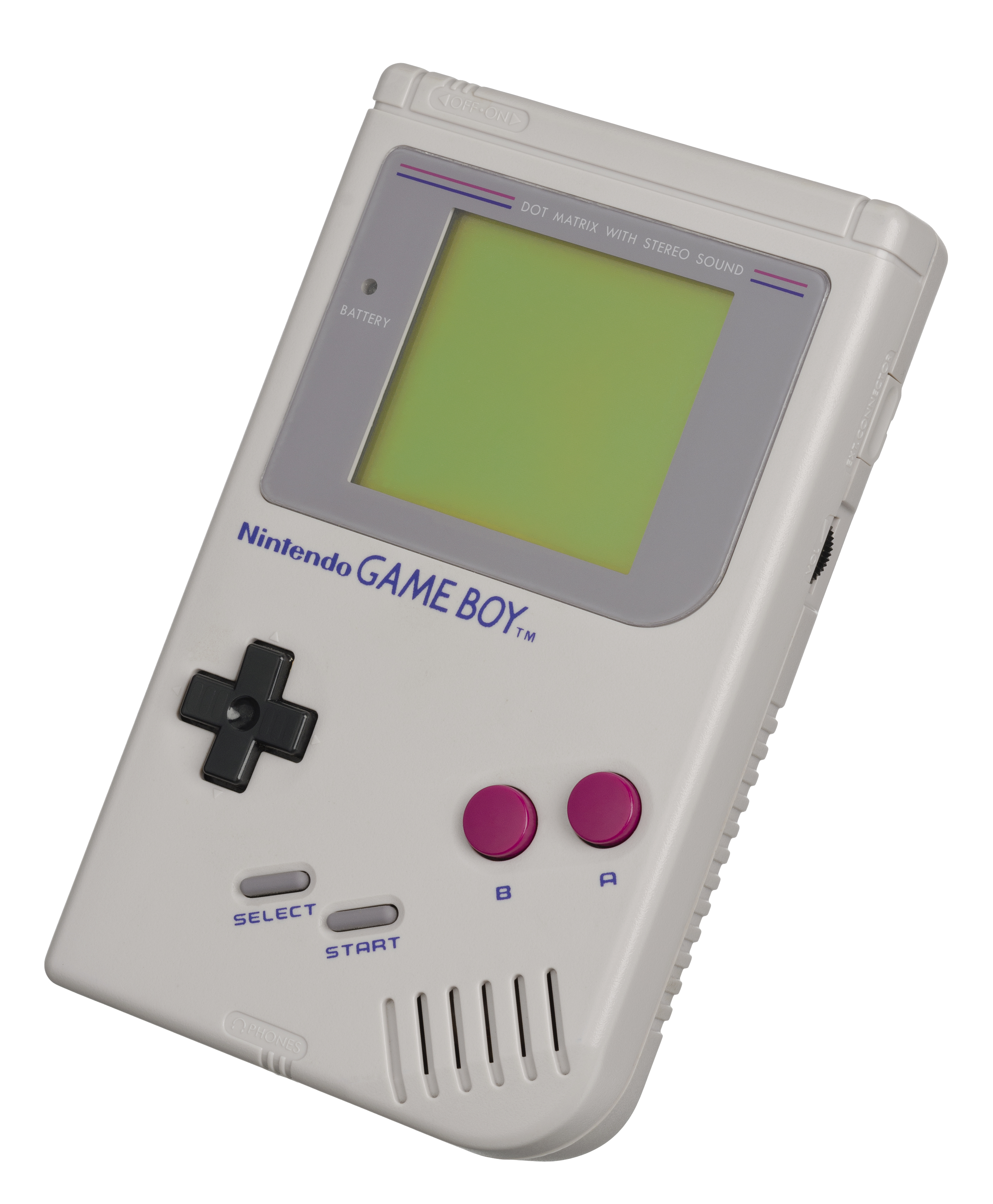
Super Mario Land was one of four launch games for the Game Boy in 1989.

The game began a Super Mario Land series of portable Mario games. Super Mario Land 2: 6 Golden Coins added a non-linear overworld and introduced villain Wario, an evil version of Mario. The subsequent Wario Land: Super Mario Land 3 began the Wario franchise. After 19 years, the 2011 game Super Mario 3D Land for the Nintendo 3DS became Mario's first game in stereoscopic 3D. Audrey Drake of IGN argued that both Wario Land and Super Mario 3D Land are not "legitimate sequels", and wrote that the latter seems more like "Super Mario Bros. 3 with Mario Galaxy influences" than a successor to Super Mario Land 2. The Superball Flower appears in Super Mario Maker 2 as an unlockable power-up item, usable only in the Super Mario Bros. style.

Super Mario Land is remembered for its miniaturized Super Mario elements and "twist on just about every Mario mainstay imaginable". Many of its new elements do not recur later in the series, making Super Mario Land strange compared to the rest of the series, or what IGN's Thomas described as a "singular oddball". IGN's Marc Nix said retrospectively that Super Mario Land was the only uninspired Mario game, with "funky voids of white" and UFOs instead of the "strikingly original" Mushroom Kingdom. Mean Machines was also put off by the alien theme, easy difficulty, and dot matrix screen blur. IGN's Travis Fahs wrote that the game was comparatively not as "ambitious" as Super Mario Bros. 3. Mean Machines said it was not "a true Mario game", not worth its originally high review score, and "in retrospect, not really a classic". Glen Fox of Nintendo Life agreed, writing that it was an impressive achievement at the time but did not age as well as other Mario games.

Eurogamer's Schilling wrote that Mario felt different—lighter, with more friction—and that the game felt "radical and distinctive" for the risks it took. IGN's Thomas cited "out of place" gameplay elements like the shooter levels, exploding Koopa shells, non-extinguishing fireballs, and non-Princess Peach plot as departures from the series. Thomas attributed this to Mario creator Miyamoto's lack of involvement in the game's development, which he described as "famously hands-off". Schilling of Eurogamer instead blamed the Game Boy's technical limitations. But he too was perplexed by the new sphinx, seahorse, and Moai head enemies, and considered the exploding Koopa shells a "cruel trick" disdainful of the series' core gameplay. Super Mario Land's shooter levels, new to the series, were not revisited in subsequent Super Mario games except the Maker games. Subsequent series games such as Super Mario Land 2 both dropped the original's tiny scale and chose the classic fire flower fireballs over the first installment's bouncing balls.

The game was included in multiple rankings of top Game Boy games, and Official Nintendo Magazine listed it at 73 in its top 100 Nintendo games. After her debut in Super Mario Land, Princess Daisy appears in later Mario series sports and racing games.

=== Popular music ===
The song "Supermarioland" (1992) by British group Ambassadors of Funk was inspired by the game and became a novelty hit, appearing in the UK top ten charts. Simon Harris, the mastermind behind Ambassadors of Funk, said that he initially had no intention to create Super Mario-themed compositions, but after his friend introduced him to Nintendo's Game Boy console, he became fond of the theme music from Super Mario Land, composed by Hirokazu Tanaka. He realised that the songs on the game's score had a similar tempo to house music, so he was able to incorporate the samples into "Supermarioland" easily, recruiting Einstein to provide the rap vocals. After Harris created the track, he contacted Nintendo to clear the music samples, and the company, liking what Harris had done, also requested that he and Einstein record an album of Super Mario material. Nintendo UK quickly began to promote and market "Supermarioland", even providing an actor for the music video, but Nintendo of America was difficult to contact, and the track was never released in the United States. Mario's designer, Shigeru Miyamoto, approved the project, and the album, titled Super Mario Compact Disco, was released in Japan in August 1993, featuring tracks from other Mario games such as Super Mario Bros. 3 and Super Mario Kart.

=== New Super Mario Land ===
A homebrew for Super Nintendo Entertainment System called New Super Mario Land came to light in 2019 after a series of posts on Twitter by a user named ChronoMoogle. The remake features enhanced visuals, music and a multiplayer mode for up to 4 players. According to its creator, who gave an interview to Nintendo Life while asking to remain anonymous, the remake was built totally from scratch (hence, no ROM hacking was performed) using Assembly language, a few tools for graphics and sound and a Super Nintendo emulator for testing. After developing the game, the creator flashed the game in thirty Nintendo Power cartridges and distributed them to his "Nintendo-loving friends" as a Christmas gift to commemorate the 30th anniversary of the original game. The creator no longer has involvement with the game, stating that "the project is terminated already" after sending the gift cartridges.
