= Wario Land =

Video game series

- Logo from 1994–1998
- Genre: Platform
- Developers: Nintendo R&D1 (1994‍–‍2001); Treasure (2003); Suzak (2007); Good-Feel (2008)
- Publisher: Nintendo
- Creators: Hiroji Kiyotake; Takehiko Hosokawa
- Platforms: Game Boy; Virtual Boy; Game Boy Color; Game Boy Advance; Wii
- First release: Wario Land: Super Mario Land 3 January 21, 1994
- Latest release: Wario Land: Shake It! July 24, 2008
- Parent series: Wario

Wario Land (Note: Japanese: ワリオランド) is a platforming video game series, a spin-off of the Mario franchise. It comprises various video games created by Nintendo, starring the character Wario. The series began with Wario Land: Super Mario Land 3, the first game to feature Wario as a playable character, following Wario's first appearance in Super Mario Land 2: 6 Golden Coins. In Wario Land, Wario has a castle in Kitchen Island, and often journeys to find treasure. Its gameplay consists of platforming through levels, tossing enemies, breaking blocks and using other abilities.

== History ==
Before appearing in his own games, Wario was the main antagonist of Super Mario Land 2: 6 Golden Coins. Wario was designed by Kiyotake, who described the character as "the Bluto to Mario's Popeye". The name "Wario" is a play on "Mario" and the Japanese word warui, which literally means "bad". The team also realized that the letter "W" was coincidentally similar to the letter "M" turned upside-down, and chose to stylize the character as such, giving him a hat similar to Mario's but with a "W" emblem rather than an "M". Additionally, the creation of Wario is said to have been representative of R&D1's attitude towards having to work on Super Mario Land at the time of development. Apparently, the R&D1 team had little creative passion for the Super Mario series, which was originally created by Nintendo's Nintendo Entertainment Analysis & Development (EAD) team led by Shigeru Miyamoto, who was busy working on Wave Race and Super Mario Kart; thus, Wario was created by R&D1 out of the disdain they felt towards having to work on a game starring a character that they didn't create.

== Games ==
Release timeline
1994	Wario Land: Super Mario Land 3
1995	Virtual Boy Wario Land
1996–1997
1998	Wario Land II
1999
2000	Wario Land 3
2001	Wario Land 4
2002–2007
2008	Wario Land: Shake It!

=== Wario Land: Super Mario Land 3 ===
Wario Land: Super Mario Land 3 (1994) is a Game Boy platform game developed and published by Nintendo, following Wario as he searches an island for treasure to fund the purchase of his own castle. Levels are side-scrolling courses across themed areas, with Wario able to stun enemies, pick them up, and throw them. In his larger form he can shoulder-charge, and the game features helmet power-ups (e.g., Bull, Jet, Dragon) that modify movement and attacks; the ending varies based on the player’s total coins.

=== Virtual Boy Wario Land ===
Virtual Boy Wario Land (1995) is a Virtual Boy platform game where Wario becomes trapped underground after discovering a treasure-filled cave and must return to the surface. Progress centers on exploration for items and power-ups while fighting enemies and bosses. A signature mechanic lets Wario jump between background and foreground planes, using the system’s stereoscopic 3D effect.

=== Wario Land II ===
Wario Land II (1998) is a Game Boy platform game in which Wario pursues Captain Syrup to recover his stolen treasure. It keeps side-scrolling platforming but shifts emphasis toward exploration, coins, and puzzle-like progression through levels. The game introduces Wario’s “immortality” mechanic: enemies cannot kill him, instead causing coin loss or transformations that grant situational abilities to reach new areas.

=== Wario Land 3 ===
Wario Land 3 (2000) is a Game Boy Color platform game whose plot centers on Wario being pulled into a mysterious music box world and trying to free the figure trapped inside. Like its predecessor, Wario is generally unable to die and instead uses enemy-caused transformations to access new routes, with progression built around collecting treasures across stages. The game’s structure is strongly collectible-driven (treasure chests and keys) and also features alternating day/night states that can change level layouts and available paths.

=== Wario Land 4 ===
Wario Land 4 (2001) is a Game Boy Advance platformer in which Wario gathers four treasures to open a pyramid and rescue Princess Shokora from the Golden Diva. Each passage contains multiple levels and ends in a boss, with collectible pieces and keys used to unlock progression within and between areas. The game adds a switch-triggered escape timer that forces a rapid return to the start, and—unlike earlier entries—gives Wario a health meter and restarts the level if it reaches zero.

=== Wario Land: Shake It! ===
Wario Land: Shake It! (2008) is a Wii platform game developed by Good-Feel and published by Nintendo, following Wario into the “Shake Dimension” in pursuit of the Bottomless Coin Sack. It is played with the Wii Remote held sideways and incorporates motion controls, including shaking to perform certain actions, alongside Wario’s standard moves. Levels emphasize money collection (coins, bags, and hidden treasures) while progressing through sequential stages across themed regions and bosses.

== Characters ==
- Wario (Japanese: ワリオ) was designed as an antagonist to Mario, and first appeared in the 1992 handheld video game Super Mario Land 2: 6 Golden Coins as the main villain and final boss. Since that time, Wario has developed into the protagonist and antihero of his own video game series spanning both handheld and console markets, in addition to his numerous appearances in spin-offs of the Mario franchise. He is voiced by Charles Martinet, who also voices the Mario, Luigi, and Waluigi characters. Wario and Waluigi seem to have been named with respect to the Japanese word warui [悪い], meaning "bad". Therefore, Wario is a "warui Mario" or "bad Mario", and Waluigi is a "warui Luigi" or "bad Luigi".
- Captain Syrup (Japanese: キャプテン・シロップ, Hepburn: Kyaputen Shiroppu) is the main antagonist of Wario Land: Super Mario Land 3 and Wario Land II. She is the leader of a legion of seafaring thieves known as the Brown Sugar Pirates, and is Wario's true archenemy, with Mario close behind. She is a technological genius and inventor, constantly building mechanized apparatuses to assist her in attacking whatever target she chooses. The Pirates' base of operations is Kitchen Island, a gigantic coved island in the middle of the ocean, and their main mode of transportation is the S.S. Teacup, a massive pirate ship. She acts as Wario's ally in Wario Land: Shake It! to have him do all of the work for her, however she betrays him in the end and steals his treasure.
- Rudy the Clown (Japanese: ナゾのぞう, Hepburn: Nazo no Zō) is the main antagonist of Wario Land 3. Rudy lures Wario into the music box world, claiming that he is the god of the world. He convinces Wario to help break the seal that was placed upon him by the other creatures of the world, with the promise of keeping any treasure Wario finds. After the seal is broken, Rudy reveals himself and attacks Wario. Wario defeats him, and the curse on the other inhabitants is broken. Rudy returns in the video game Dr. Mario 64, where he and Mad Scienstein concoct a plan to steal the Megavitamins from Dr. Mario because he has a cold, and wants the power to cure any illness.
- Golden Diva (Japanese: ヨーキ, Hepburn: Yōki) is the main antagonist of Wario Land 4. She is responsible for taking over the golden pyramid that was originally ruled by Princess Shokora whom she placed a curse upon turning her into a black cat. Wario decides to explore the pyramid after reading about its legend in an article. She is not encountered until later in the game when the player gains access to the innermost chamber of the pyramid where various treasures are being kept.
- Princess Shokora (Japanese: ショコラ姫, Hepburn: Shokora-hime) appears in Wario Land 4. In the game's manual, it is mentioned that she was the original owner of the golden pyramid where the game takes place in, but was cursed by the Golden Diva. In her cursed form, Shokora is capable of shapeshifting, her most common forms being a tiny black cat and a black stick figure. For a price, Wario can get her help in boss fights by inflicting damage on the boss before the fight begins. After Wario recovers her belongings from the pyramid's bosses and destroys the Golden Diva, Shokora is released from the curse and thanks Wario for saving her (though her appearance and Wario's reaction changes based on how many other treasures Wario obtained from the bosses), then is escorted by angels into the heavens.
- The Shake King (Japanese: シェイキング, Hepburn: Sheikingu) is the main antagonist of Wario Land: Shake It! who kidnaps Queen Merelda and takes the Shake Dimension's treasures, among them the Bottomless Coin Bag that holds an infinite number of coins. Sweet-talked by Captain Syrup with promises of treasure, Wario defeats the Shake King and frees the Shake Dimension from his evil, though this registers as a complete afterthought in Wario's mind.
- Queen Merelda (Japanese: クイーンメルフル, Hepburn: Kuīn Merufuru) appears in Wario Land: Shake It! as the ruler of the Shake Dimension. She is captured by the Shake King in the game's beginning. After being rescued by Wario, Merelda gives him her gratitude, but Wario throws her aside and takes the Bottomless Coin Bag, only for Syrup to steal it from him due to a deal that Merfle made with her.
- Merfle (Japanese: メルフル, Hepburn: Merufuru) appears in Wario Land: Shake It!. She is a small fairy-like creature who helps Wario enter and leave the Shake Dimension. Many of her friends (all of them the same species as Merfle) are captured by the Shake King, and Wario must save them in addition to recovering treasures. At the end of the game, Captain Syrup steals the Bottomless Coin Bag from Wario and Merfle explains that it was already promised to her. This sends Wario into a rage as he chases Merfle through his garage.
- Count Cannoli (Japanese: アルデンテ, Hepburn: Arudente) is the original star of the television show The Silver Zephyr, in which he is the titular thief. A master of disguise, Cannoli uses his magic wand Goodstyle to change his appearance, but Wario leaps into the television world of the show and steals Goodstyle out of jealousy. Over the course of the game, Cannoli chases Wario demanding Goodstyle back and is a frequent obstacle as he sets traps and attacks Wario in his mechanical Mad Hat vehicle.
- Goodstyle (Japanese: ステッキオ, Hepburn: Sutekkio) is a sentient magic wand that grants its wearer the power to change their appearance. He has been passed down through the Cannoli family for many generations, but Wario steals him from the current-day Count Cannoli and uses him to become his own alter-ego "The Purple Wind". Goodstyle accepts Wario as his new master and teaches him how to use his power. After Wario defeats Terrormisu, Goodstyle reveals his true form as the very first member of the Cannoli Clan and the one who originally banished Terrormisu. He thanks Wario for his help and gives him all the accumulated wealth of the Cannoli Clan as gratitude. However, Wario discovers that he can't take the treasure out of the television world, leaving him both penniless and furious.
- Carpaccio (Japanese: カルパッチョ, Hepburn: Karupaccho) is a rival thief to Count Cannoli. He owns a corporation called Sigil Securities and can transform into a giant blue ball with a face on it. He initially does not think much of Wario, but quickly realizes that "The Purple Wind" is more than he appears. At one point, Carpaccio teams with Count Cannoli to stop Wario from reassembling the Wishstone, a magical relic that supposedly can grant any wish.
- Tiaramisu (Japanese: マルゲリータ, Hepburn: Marugerīta) is a blonde woman in a pink dress who first appears to Wario on Sweatmore Peak and helps him briefly during his search for the Wishstone. After Wario fully reassembles the Wishstone, she reveals her true identity as the demon Terrormisu, the true main antagonist of the game who had been sealed away in the Wishstone by the first of the Cannoli Clan and had been manipulating Wario to reassemble it so she can return and cause disaster. She is ultimately defeated by Wario and runs back into the underworld crying, never to return.

== Development ==
The Wario Land series are primarily side-scrolling platform games that star the character Wario, who is designed to be the opposite of the character Mario from the Mario series. Wario made his debut in the 1992 video game Super Mario Land 2: 6 Golden Coins on the Game Boy, serving as the antagonist to its protagonist, Mario. During the events of Super Mario Land, where Mario was away in another country, Wario took Mario's castle, losing it to Mario in the end when he is defeated. Wario has had other games crossing over with Mario characters before the Wario Land series began, such as Mario & Wario and Wario's Woods.

The first entry of the Wario Land series is Wario Land: Super Mario Land 3 for the Game Boy, where Wario serves as the protagonist and the gameplay focuses on Wario's strength, giving him a shoulder charge. Wario has similar mechanics to Mario in his series, such as shrinking when injured and acquiring power-ups. His goal is to steal a statue of Princess Toadstool from the antagonist, Captain Syrup, as well as get money and a castle. The game will have a different ending depending on how many coins are earned by the end. The next Wario Land was titled Virtual Boy Wario Land for the Virtual Boy, featuring similar gameplay to its predecessor.

Another Game Boy game was released titled Wario Land II, which changes the gameplay from the previous two entries. While continuing to be a platformer, Wario is now unable to be defeated by enemies and obstacles, instead losing coins and being knocked back upon damage.

== Reception ==
Sales and aggregate review scores As of December 2014.
Game	Year	Units sold (in millions)	GameRankings	Metacritic
Wario Land: Super Mario Land 3	1994	5.19	83.11%	–
Virtual Boy Wario Land	1995	–	–	–
Wario Land II	1998	1.48	88.04%	–
Wario Land 3	2000	2.20	90%	–
Wario Land 4	2001	2.20	85.34%	88/100
Wario Land: Shake It!	2008	1.06	77.80%	78/100

Den Fami Nico Gamer writer Shelloop believed that the first Wario Land game was created out of a dissatisfaction with how Super Mario Bros. played, citing how tough Wario is as a character in it. He also believed that Wario's toughness was attributed out of consideration for players who struggle to dodge attacks, also allowing for players to be more daring with Wario. He cited the game's creator, who stated that dissatisfaction with how Super Mario Bros. handled enemy interaction led him to create the Screw Attack for Samus Aran in the video game Metroid. He felt that Wario Land II was a departure from the more traditional mechanics found in the first game, calling it ahead of its time for eliminating extra lives, citing how games such as Super Princess Peach, Yoshi's Woolly World, and Super Mario Odyssey eventually adopted a similar system. He also believed that the Wario Land series was ahead of its time in other ways compared to Mario, such as featuring female villains and vocalized music.
