= Wario Land 4 =

2001 video game

- Australian box art
- Developer: Nintendo R&D1
- Publisher: Nintendo
- Director: Hirofumi Matsuoka
- Producer: Takehiro Izushi
- Designers: Hiroji Kiyotake; Tomoyoshi Yamane; Takehiko Hosokawa; Masani Ueda; Isao Hirano; Shinya Sano; Ryuichi Nakada; Takayasu Morisawa
- Programmers: Katsuya Yamano; Yoshinori Katsuki; Nobuhiro Ozaki; Kota Fukui; Goro Abe; Ko Takeuchi
- Artists: Yasuo Inoue; Sachiko Nakamichi
- Composer: Ryoji Yoshitomi
- Series: Wario Land
- Platform: Game Boy Advance
- Release: JP: August 21, 2001; AU: November 9, 2001; EU: November 16, 2001; NA: November 19, 2001
- Genre: Platform
- Mode: Single-player

Wario Land 4 (Note: Known in Japan as Wario Land Advance (Japanese: ワリオランドアドバンス, Hepburn: Wario Rando Adobansu); supporting material further titles the game Wario Land Advance: Treasures of Yoki (Japanese: ワリオランドアドバンス ヨーキのお宝, Hepburn: Wario Rando Adobansu: Yōki no Otakara).) is a 2001 platform game developed by Nintendo R&D1 and published by Nintendo for the Game Boy Advance. It is the fourth installment in the Wario Land subseries of the Wario series. It was released in Japan in August 2001 and November 2001 internationally. In the game, Wario has to gather four treasures to unlock a pyramid and save Princess Shokora from the Golden Diva. The game received acclaim for its graphics and gameplay.

== Gameplay ==
Wario jumps between platforms on the Monsoon Jungle level of the Emerald Passage. Ahead of him lie four blue crystals; behind him, an enemy crocodile has jumped out of the water in an attempt to bite him.

The gameplay of Wario Land 4 (which is generally similar to that of Wario Land II and Wario Land 3) allows for some open-endedness as well as some order of difficulty. After an Entry Passage that serves as a tutorial for the game, there are four main passages: the Emerald, Ruby, Topaz, and Sapphire Passages. The Emerald Passage is themed around nature. The Ruby Passage is themed around mechanics and technology. The Topaz Passage is themed around toys, games, and other "playtime" ideas. The Sapphire Passage is themed around horror and danger, prominently involving ghosts and the like. Every passage contains four levels and culminates in a boss fight. After these four main passages is the "Final" Golden Pyramid, which serves as a recap of these four themes and houses the Golden Passage level and the final boss.

Each level contains four jewel pieces, which are found in boxes scattered throughout the level that need to be collected. Finding all jewel pieces within a passage unlocks access to the boss. The player must also find a creature called a Keyzer, which will unlock the door to the next level. The player can also collect treasure that increases their score in the form of coins that are dropped by enemies and floating crystals.

Wario begins every level by jumping through a Vortex that then closes behind him. It can only be reopened by finding a Switch located somewhere in the level. When the Switch is pressed, a timer will appear, and the player must travel back to the beginning of the level as quickly as possible before it expires. If the player fails to backtrack to the start of the level before the timer runs out, their score will begin to rapidly deplete, which results in Wario getting kicked out of the stage and losing all of the player's collectibles that were obtained in the level, forcing the player to start over. Switches can also make certain blocks appear or disappear, often making the player take a completely different path to the Vortex.

Unlike previous entries, Wario now has a health meter that depletes when he takes damage. If Wario loses all of his health, the player will lose any collectibles they had found and must start the level over.

Every Passage ends with a boss, which must be defeated within a time limit. Players can optionally use medals gained from playing minigames to buy an item that deals damage to the boss before the fight begins.

== Plot ==
Wario is reading the newspaper when he notices an article about a mysterious pyramid found deep in the jungle. The legend related to the pyramid is that of Princess Shokora, ruler of the pyramid, who was cursed by the money-crazed Golden Diva. As he enters it, he finds a black cat and chases it. Doing so, he falls down a precipice and is stuck inside the pyramid.

Exploring the pyramid, Wario has to fight several bosses, each of whom is in possession of both items Princess Shokora once wore and several treasure chests. After completing these passages, Wario gains access to the innermost part of the pyramid, which ends up being the stronghold of the Golden Diva. Wario meets the cat again, who turns out to be Princess Shokora herself. Wario defeats the Golden Diva and exits the pyramid with all the treasure he has acquired.

Upon their escape, Shokora is restored to her true form—this may be a brattish child, a female version of Wario, a Peach-like princess, and, ultimately, a superheroine-like princess (what form Shokora is restored to depends on the total number of treasure chests Wario had acquired from the other bosses prior to facing the Golden Diva as well as how quickly each boss, the Golden Diva included, is defeated—if he took too long to defeat any of them, some of these chests will be withheld). Shokora gives Wario a kiss on the cheek and ascends to the sky as Wario watches. After she leaves, Wario grabs his loot, and the ending implies that he went off to celebrate by going to an all-you-can-eat steak buffet.

== Re-releases ==
Wario Land 4 was included in the list of Game Boy Advance games that were available for download by the Nintendo 3DS Ambassador Program since December 16, 2011. It was rereleased on the Wii U Virtual Console in 2014: in Japan on April 30, in North America on May 8, and in Europe and Australia on June 5. It was rereleased on the Nintendo Classics service on February 14, 2025.

== Reception ==
Reception

Aggregate scores
Aggregator	Score
GameRankings	85.34%
Metacritic	88/100

Review scores
Publication	Score
Electronic Gaming Monthly	7.5/10
Eurogamer	8/10
Famitsu	9/10, 8/10, 8/10, 8/10
Game Informer	8.5/10
GamePro	4.5/5
GameSpot	8.7/10
IGN	9/10
Nintendo Life	9/10
Nintendo Power	4/5
Nintendo World Report	9/10

In the United States, Wario Land 4 sold 720,000 copies and earned $20 million by August 2006. During the period between January 2000 and August 2006, it was the 33rd highest-selling game launched for the Game Boy Advance, Nintendo DS or PlayStation Portable in that country. The game sold a total of 2.2 million copies worldwide.

The game received critical acclaim. IGN gave Wario Land 4 a 9 out of 10, or "Outstanding", citing its well thought out level design and replayability. GamePro stated "Boasting fantastic graphics and awesome transparency effects for water and fog, Wario Land 4 pushes the GBA to its visual limits". GameSpot commented "The gameplay is tight and varied, the graphics are detailed and bright, and the sound is second to none". GameSpy called the game "an incredibly entertaining, diverse, and humorous addition to the Mario/Wario legacy. It's challenging and creative, but not as outright frustrating as Wario Land 3." Game Informer wrote: "It's nothing new to the Wario Land enthusiast, but it's enjoyable nonetheless". Nintendo Power stated: "It's polished variety paired with a mishmash of moves, which makes Wario Land 4 fun through and through."

Wario Land 4 was a runner-up for GameSpot's annual "Best Game Boy Advance Game" and, among console games, "Best Platform Game" awards. These went respectively to Advance Wars and Conker's Bad Fur Day.

== Legacy ==
Nintendo R&D1 would use Wario Land 4's engine to create Metroid Fusion (2002). Wario Land 4 also inspired several indie games. Antonball Deluxe (2021), Pizza Tower (2023), and Antonblast (2024) were all directly inspired by Wario Land 4, as confirmed by their respective developers, with Pizza Tower and Antonblast incorporating their own takes on Wario's transformations and the game's level-end escape segments (the latter known as "Pizza Time" in Pizza Tower and "Happy Hour" in Antonblast). While Antonball Deluxe incorporated the shoulder-bash ability renamed as the "clutch".
