= Wario Land: Shake It! =

2008 video game

- North American box art
- Developer: Good-Feel
- Publisher: Nintendo
- Director: Madoka Yamauchi
- Producers: Takahiro Harada; Etsunobu Ebisu
- Designer: Madoka Yamauchi
- Programmers: Koichi Yagi; Takanori Mori; Hironori Kuraoka; Yuhei Matsuda; Naoya Sakamoto
- Artist: Tadanori Tsukawaki
- Composers: Tomoya Tomita; Minako Hamano
- Series: Wario Land
- Platform: Wii
- Release: JP: July 24, 2008; NA: September 22, 2008; EU: September 26, 2008
- Genre: Platform
- Mode: Single-player

Wario Land: Shake It!, known in Europe as Wario Land: The Shake Dimension and in Japan as Wario Land Shake, (Note: Japanese: ワリオランドシェイク, Hepburn: Wario Rando Sheiku) is a 2008 platform game developed by Good-Feel and published by Nintendo for the Wii, with animation produced by Production I.G. The game is the sixth installment in the Wario Land series, and is part of the Wario franchise. It follows Wario as he enters the Shake Dimension with the goal of obtaining the Bottomless Coin Sack, which provides an endless supply of coins.

It was digitally re-released on the Wii U eShop during 2016: in PAL regions on April 7, in Japan on August 24, and in North America on November 17.

== Gameplay ==
Wario Land: Shake It! is a side-scrolling platform game in which the player controls the protagonist, Wario, who must travel through five distinct continents, each of which offers up to seven sequential levels, defeating the boss in each of them. The game is played by holding the Wii Remote horizontally, and makes use of the controller's motion control features; in addition to Wario's standard moveset, including a forward charge attack and a butt stomp, Wario also possesses several new moves which utilize the Wii Remote's motion-sensitive features. By shaking the controller, Wario can perform a powerful ground punch, which stuns nearby enemies and activates certain mechanisms. He can also pick up stunned enemies and coin bags, and shake them using the Wii Remote to make them spit out coins and items, and can throw picked up enemies and objects, aiming by tilting the controller. Various vehicle-based sections, which involve activities such as riding mine carts and piloting a submarine, also make use of the Wii Remote's tilt controls.

The primary goal of each level in the game is to rescue creatures known as Merfles, who are imprisoned inside a cage located at the end of each level. Except for submarine levels, breaking open a Merfle cage triggers a countdown, with the player required to return to the beginning of the level before time runs out. Wario can make use of special machines to put him into a speedy dash which can break blocks in his path, with players encouraged to maintain their dash in order to return to the beginning quickly, as well as reach treasures and coins that are otherwise inaccessible. Players can replay levels in order to attempt optional objectives. The player's secondary objective is to collect as much money as possible, either from collecting coins scattered across the level or obtained from coin bags, or by finding the three hidden treasures that can be found in each level. Players can use any earned money at Captain Syrup's shop to purchase items, such as health upgrades and maps to new continents.

== Plot ==
Wario Land: Shake It! starts with Captain Syrup breaking into a museum and observing the surface of an ancient globe, which houses the Shake Dimension. Captain Syrup witnesses a crisis occurring in the Shake Dimension, in which the Shake King has imprisoned Queen Merelda and her Merfle subjects and claimed the legendary "Bottomless Coin Sack", which releases an endless supply of coins when shaken. She steals the ancient globe and mails it to Wario, claiming that the real treasure is inside. Before Wario is able to break the globe open, one of the escaped Merfles emerges and asks for help. Wario becomes interested in the affair only after learning of the Bottomless Coin Sack, and follows the Merfle back into the Shake Dimension.

After progressing through multiple worlds, Wario eventually confronts the Shake King and defeats him. Queen Merelda crowns Wario a hero, though he instead nonchalantly claims the Bottomless Coin Sack and takes it home. Much to Wario's dismay, however, Captain Syrup takes the sack for herself as payment for agreeing to help Merfle save the Shake Dimension. Outraged, Wario chases Merfle around the garage.

== Development ==
Wario Land: Shake It! was developed by the Japanese video game developer, Good-Feel. Madoka Yamauchi was the game's director, while Takahiro Harada and Etsunobu Ebisu were the producers. Development for the game began after Harada approached Ebisu and suggested that a new Wario platform game be made. Harada wanted to extend a gameplay dynamic prevalent in previous Wario Land games, which is Wario's "use of strength to overcome opposition", and had the developers at Good-Feel play those games to understand that dynamic. Design director Tadanori Tsukawaki asked Wario's animators "to strongly emphasize his manly characteristics" to help re-create this feel. Composer Tomoya Tomita used Wario Land 4 for inspiration when writing the game's music. As with previous Wario games, Wario in Wario Land: Shake It! was voiced by Charles Martinet.

Wario Land: Shake It! was designed to be played by holding the Wii Remote sideways to emulate holding a NES gamepad or SNES gamepad. Yamauchi suggested shaking the Wii Remote as a key method of control after hearing Harada say that "when he sees something placed high up, he wants to knock it down." In early development for the game, the player would shake the Wii Remote in either horizontal or vertical directions to perform distinct actions, but this idea was dropped when tests indicated that the controller could not differentiate shaking in one direction versus another. The limited number of buttons easily accessible by the player when holding the Wii Remote sideways also presented difficulties; having the player to tilt the Wii Remote at different angles to perform different actions was chosen to overcome this obstacle. Yamauchi stated that this simple control scheme would potentially benefit newer video game players.

Yamauchi proposed the hand-drawn art style which is featured in the final game, though Tsukawaki was initially opposed to the idea since future changes to a character's design meant changes to all of its individual animation frames for the game. Over 2,000 frames were drawn to animate over 200 actions for Wario alone; over 6,000 frames were drawn for all enemy characters, including those that were removed from the final game. All the game's backgrounds and scenery were also hand-drawn. Program director Koichi Yagi stated that clever programming techniques were required to efficiently store and handle both the non-repeating backgrounds and the thousands of character frames in the Wii console RAM during gameplay. Japanese anime studio Production I.G assisted with character animations and both the opening and closing cutscenes, while studio Kusanagi drew the backgrounds.

=== Marketing ===
Nintendo held various marketing campaigns, most notably an interactive YouTube video. The company also held a competition at Six Flags near Los Angeles and St. Louis, where competitors competed for a "bottomless coin sack." Participants received fake Wario mustaches, and the winner won both the sack and an all-expense-paid trip to Nintendo World in New York. Another marketing campaign had Nintendo giving away gasoline at a Los Angeles Mobile Gas area to market Wario Land: Shake It! in reference to Wario's flatulence.

== Reception ==
Reception

Aggregate scores
Aggregator	Score
GameRankings	77.80%
Metacritic	78/100

Review scores
Publication	Score
1Up.com	C+
Edge	6/10
Famitsu	31/40
Game Informer	6.75/10
GameSpot	7.5/10
IGN	8.4/10
Nintendo Life	8/10
Nintendo Power	8/10
Nintendo World Report	9/10
Official Nintendo Magazine	88%

Wario Land: Shake It! received "generally favorable" reviews from critics, according to the review aggregation website Metacritic. The game received a score of 8.4 out of 10 from IGN and a score of 31 out of 40 from Famitsu. Nintendo Power gave a score of 8.0. X-Play gave the game a 4 out of 5, praising the gameplay, but calling the constant shaking of the Wii Remote tedious and repetitive. GameSpot gave it 7.5 out of 10, praising the beautiful art style and fun gameplay, but criticizing the gimmicky motion controls and short game length. It was nominated for multiple Wii-specific awards by IGN in its 2008 video game awards, including Best Platform Game and Best Artistic Design. Author Roger Pederson listed it as one of the best Wii games of 2008.

Wario Land: Shake It! entered Japanese sales charts as the eighth best-selling game of the release week at 25,000 copies. The game eventually slipped several places on the charts, but climbed back to tenth place for the week ending August 21, 2008. Japanese sales for the game reached approximately 114,263 units by the end of 2008, according to Media Create. As of December 2008, Wario Land: Shake It! sold about 150,000 copies in the United States. This figure fell short of the game's 350,000 sales goal, which the marketing team attributes to a weak economy and lower video game sales overall. Despite this, the game sold 1.06 million copies worldwide.
