= Super Mario Land 2: 6 Golden Coins =

1992 video game

- North American box art
- Developer: Nintendo R&D1
- Publisher: Nintendo
- Directors: Hiroji Kiyotake; Takehiko Hosokawa
- Producer: Gunpei Yokoi
- Programmers: Takahiro Harada; Yuzuru Ogawa
- Artists: Hiroji Kiyotake; Takehiko Hosokawa; Makoto Kano
- Composer: Kazumi Totaka
- Series: Super Mario
- Platform: Game Boy
- Release: JP: October 21, 1992; NA: November 2, 1992; UK: November 28, 1992; EU: January 28, 1993; AU: March 12, 1993
- Genre: Platform
- Mode: Single-player

Super Mario Land 2: 6 Golden Coins (Note: Japanese: スーパーマリオランド2 6つの金貨, Hepburn: Sūpā Mario Rando Tsū Muttsu no Kinka) is a 1992 platform game developed and published by Nintendo for the Game Boy. It is the sequel to Super Mario Land. In Super Mario Land 2, the player assumes the role of the protagonist Mario, whose main objective is to reclaim his personal island, Mario Land, from the clutches of his greedy rival Wario. The gameplay builds and expands on that of its precursor with innovations carried over from Super Mario World and Super Mario Bros. 3.

Super Mario Land 2 received critical acclaim upon release and sold over 11 million copies, becoming one of the most successful and highest-rated titles on the Game Boy. Reviewers emphasized that the game surpassed its predecessor in all aspects. Super Mario Land 2 marks the debut appearance of Wario, who would become a prominent character in the Super Mario series as the antihero of several games, the first being this game's sequel Wario Land: Super Mario Land 3. Super Mario Land 2 was re-released in 2011 as a downloadable title for the Nintendo 3DS, and the Nintendo Switch in 2023, as part of the Nintendo Classics service.

== Plot ==
Super Mario Land 2 takes place immediately following the events of Super Mario Land. While Mario was away in Sarasaland, a jealous childhood acquaintance named Wario puts an evil spell over Mario's private island, Mario Land. After several prior unsuccessful attempts, he finally takes over Mario's castle with the spell, brainwashing its inhabitants into believing Wario is their master and Mario is their enemy. Wario's motive behind this sudden attack is to steal Mario's castle out of a desire to have a palace of his own.

After traveling through Mario Land and collecting the six Golden Coins, Mario regains entry to his castle. Inside, Mario confronts and defeats Wario, who shrinks and flees, breaking his spell and causing Mario's castle to revert to its normal form.

== Gameplay ==
In-game screenshot

The objective of Super Mario Land 2 is to reach the end of each level, defeating or avoiding enemies while doing so. The game retains several enemies from the Mario series, such as the Goomba and the Koopa Troopa, and also introduces several new enemies. Enemies can usually be defeated by jumping on their head, but also may need to be defeated by different means, such as by use of fireballs. Other established mechanics include Warp Pipes, allow the player to enter hidden areas or find shortcuts, coins, and ? blocks which hide coins and items. Unlike in previous Mario games, coins are not accumulated to automatically grant extra lives; instead, they are used to play games in a special area that awards lives and other power-ups. To gain lives, instead, the player must find hearts like they did in the previous Game Boy entry. After 100 enemies are defeated, a star drifts down to provide a short period of invincibility when touched. The star can also be found in other places in the game. While Mario is invincible, the fifth and each subsequent enemy he defeats will provide one extra life.

While its predecessor was similar to the original Super Mario Bros., Super Mario Land 2 has more in common with Super Mario Bros. 3 and Super Mario World: there is an overworld map, the player is no longer restricted to moving only right in a stage, many stages contain higher and lower areas instead of entire stages all at a single level, and any stage (except for the introductory stage and "boss" levels) can be replayed multiple times. At the end of a level, there is a door that must be touched to clear a level. In addition, there is also a bell high above the door which, if touched, activates a mini-game where the player can try to get either a power-up or 1-ups. The game saves the player's progress after beating a stage, being the first Mario game released on a portable system to have a save feature.

There are 32 levels in total, based in several different themed zones. There are some secret levels that can only be accessed by finding alternative exits found in regular levels. Once a player clears or loses a life in these secret levels, they are returned to the level where the secret exit was found. Each zone has its own boss, which must be defeated to get one of the six Golden Coins. If the player loses all of Mario's lives, all of the Coins Mario retrieved are returned to the bosses, which must be defeated again to retrieve the coins. From the beginning of the game, the player may choose to complete the zones in any order.

Super Mario Land 2 features three returning power-ups—the Super Mushroom, Fire Flower, and Starman. The Super Mushroom increases Mario's size, the Fire Flower gives him the ability to shoot fireballs, and the Starman makes Mario invulnerable for a short time to anything besides pits. Both the Super Mushroom and the Fire Flower also allow Mario to do a spin jump like in Super Mario World. Due to the grayscale palette, Fire Mario is differentiated from Super Mario by having a feather in his cap, a feature not seen in any other Mario series game. Also unique to Super Mario Land 2 is the Magic Carrot power-up, which turns Mario into Bunny Mario. Bunny Mario can jump higher, jump repeatedly by holding down the jump button, and descend slowly using his ears.

Upon collecting all Golden Coins, Mario's Palace is unlocked, where Mario must fight Wario in the castle throne room. To defeat Wario, Mario must jump on his head three times, a process that must subsequently be repeated in two additional rooms where Wario uses power-ups identical to Mario's.

== Development ==
Super Mario Land 2: 6 Golden Coins, the sequel to 1989's Super Mario Land, was developed by Nintendo's Nintendo Research & Development 1 (R&D1) department led by Gunpei Yokoi, who were responsible for several other Game Boy titles, including the original Super Mario Land game. As with its predecessor, Yokoi served as the game's producer, while it was directed by Hiroji Kiyotake, who had previously worked on other R&D1 titles such as Dr. Mario and Metroid II: Return of Samus, and Takehiko Hosokawa, who also designed several of the game's enemies. Hosokawa initially came onto the project as "assistant character designer" before ultimately becoming "half a director" alongside Kiyotake.

Development for Super Mario Land 2 began in November 1991, lasting about a year and ending in September 1992. According to Kiyotake in an interview included within the game's official strategy guide, the development team wanted the game not to feel "bound by the conventions of the previous games", striving to make it feel unique compared to the previous Super Mario games. This attitude was toned down slightly after the team completed the first draft and concluded that what they were making didn't feel much like a Super Mario title, opting to make the game closer in design to Super Mario World.

The plot of Super Mario Land 2, which depicts Mario trying to reclaim ownership of his castle, was intended to be a change in routine from other Super Mario games by having him pursue something for his own benefit, as opposed to other entries in which he is fighting to help another individual, such as Princess Peach. The game's antagonist, Wario, was designed by Kiyotake, who described the character as "the Bluto to Mario's Popeye". The name "Wario" is a play on "Mario" and the Japanese word warui, which literally means "bad". The team also realized that the letter "W" was coincidentally similar to the letter "M" turned upside-down, and chose to stylize the character as such, giving him a hat similar to Mario's but with a "W" emblem rather than an "M". Additionally, the creation of Wario is said to have been representative of R&D1's attitude towards having to work on Super Mario Land at the time of development. Apparently, the R&D1 team had little creative passion for the Super Mario series, which was originally created by Nintendo's Nintendo Entertainment Analysis & Development (EAD) team led by Shigeru Miyamoto, who was busy working on Wave Race and Super Mario Kart; thus, Wario was created by R&D1 out of the disdain they felt towards having to work on a game starring a character that they did not create.

The music and sound effects were made by Kazumi Totaka, who had previously done sound design for Mario Paint. "Totaka's Song", a signature piece of Totaka's found in most of his works, is also hidden in the game and can be heard in the Game Over screen after waiting for 2 minutes and 30 seconds. According to Totaka, the team chose to use different sound effects from those in other Super Mario games, as they were worried that players would otherwise become subconsciously aware of the game's hardware inferiorities compared to the Super NES's Super Mario World, such as its small screen size and lack of sprite scaling.

== Release ==
In Japan, the game was released on October 21, 1992.

In the United Kingdom, the game was released on November 28, 1992. Nintendo UK marketed it with a print ad and slogan that states: "Why did the Hedgehog cross the road? To get to Super Mario Land 2".

=== Re-release ===
The game was released for the Nintendo 3DS's Virtual Console service via the eShop; in 2011 on September 29 in North America and PAL regions, followed by Japan on October 12, and on June 1, 2016, in South Korea. When Game Boy games were added to the Nintendo Classics service on February 8, 2023, the game was one of nine titles made available at launch.

== Reception ==
=== Critical response ===
Reception

Aggregate score
Aggregator	Score
GameRankings	79.56% (GB & 3DS)

Review scores
Publication	Score
AllGame	4.5/5
Electronic Gaming Monthly	9/10, 9/10, 9/10, 8/10
Famitsu	7/10, 6/10, 7/10, 5/10
IGN	9/10
Nintendo Life	9/10
Bad Influence!	8/10
Mega Guide	Positive

Award
Publication	Award
Nintendo Power	Best Overall Game (Game Boy)

Like its predecessor, Super Mario Land 2 received critical acclaim, with many critics considering it an improvement over the original. Official Nintendo Magazine ranked the game 44th on their list of the "100 Greatest Nintendo Games". In Nintendo Power, the three reviewers complimented the game's graphics, its new levels and themes, and new power-ups. Nintendo Power also listed it as the seventh best Game Boy/Game Boy Color video game, praising it for its improvements over Super Mario Land and for having impressive visuals for a handheld game. The reviewers in Electronic Gaming Monthly praised the game in terms of graphics and variety in its gameplay. One reviewers said the large sprites helped reduce the "horrible blurring" on the Game Boy. A review in GamePro also complimented the graphics saying that it was especially important that they look "since the advent of color hand-helds." Allgame also commented on the graphics, stating that the similar platform game Donkey Kong Land displays "more detailed graphics, the downside to this is that levels tend to blur quite a bit more when in motion. So in this respect, you get a fair trade off". The review concluded that "in overall fun and enjoyment, it's hard to go wrong with this title. It's not a very long game, but even experienced players should find a little challenge in it. It's excellent for road-trips where you may only play in short sessions".

Before it became available for the Nintendo 3DS, GamesRadar listed Super Mario Land 2 as one of the titles that they want on the 3DS Virtual Console. PC Magazine listed it in the "Top 10 Best Game Boy Games". In their ranking of every Super Mario game from best to worst, Digital Trends listed Super Mario Land 2 as the 19th best game in the series, calling it "likely the game fans were hoping for" due to its comparable gameplay to the home console games, but considering it somewhat obsolete now that there are other options for playing Super Mario games portably. The UK-based magazine Total gave the first Super Mario Land game 94%, but only gave the sequel 70%. The Washington Post ranked Super Mario Land 2 the 15th best Mario game overall.

=== Sales ===
In Japan, it topped the Famitsu sales chart in November 1992, and went on to sell 2.6 million units in Japan alone. In the United States, the game topped Babbage's Game Boy sales charts for two months in 1992, from November to December. By March 1993, more than 5 million cartridges had been sold worldwide. The game sold a total of approximately 11.18 million copies worldwide, making it the fifth best-selling Game Boy game of all time.

== Legacy ==
The character Wario, introduced in this game, would go on to star in his own spin-off series beginning with 1994's Wario Land: Super Mario Land 3, and after that also starred in the WarioWare series. Wario has also continued to regularly appear in various Mario spin-offs such as Mario Kart, Super Smash Bros., and the Mario sports titles, while also getting his own Luigi equivalent with the introduction of Waluigi in Mario Tennis.

The January 1993 issue of Nintendo Power magazine contained a 10-page comic entitled Mario vs. Wario which was a loose retelling of Super Mario Land 2's plot. In the comic, Mario's childhood playmate Wario invites him over to his castle to "catch up on things". Unbeknownst to Mario, however, Wario is secretly plotting revenge on Mario, whom he believes used to bully him when they were children. During his trip to Wario's castle, Mario encounters several of the bosses from the game who were sent by Wario to eliminate Mario, a detail of which Mario is unaware. Upon reaching Wario's castle, Mario encounters a giant Wario, whom he defeats by pulling a plug on his overalls. The comic ends with Mario apologizing to Wario and playing cowboys, with Wario once again vowing revenge on Mario. In 2016, Mario vs. Wario and its predecessor Super Mario Adventures were re-released by VIZ Communications.
