= Wario Land 3 =

2000 video game

- European box art
- Developer: Nintendo R&D1
- Publisher: Nintendo
- Director: Takehiko Hosokawa
- Producer: Takehiro Izushi
- Designers: Hiroji Kiyotake; Masahiko Mashimo; Masani Ueda; Isao Hirano; Shinya Sano
- Programmers: Masaru Yamanaka; Katsuya Yamano; Nobuhiro Ozaki; Yoshinori Katsuki
- Composer: Kozue Ishikawa
- Series: Wario Land
- Platform: Game Boy Color
- Release: JP: March 21, 2000; EU: April 14, 2000; NA: May 30, 2000
- Genre: Platform
- Mode: Single-player

Wario Land 3, known in Japan as Wario Land 3: Mysterious Music Box, (Note: Japanese: ワリオランド3 不思議なオルゴール, Hepburn: Wario Rando Surī: Fushigi na Orugōru) is a 2000 platform game developed by Nintendo R&D1 and published by Nintendo for the Game Boy Color. The game's plot centers around Wario who must free a mysterious figure who is trapped inside a music box. The game was released in Japan on March 21, 2000, Europe on April 14, 2000, and North America on May 30, 2000.

The game was later re-released for the Nintendo 3DS Virtual Console in 2013, and as part of the Nintendo Classics service on February 8, 2023.

== Gameplay ==
The gameplay in Wario Land 3 is very similar to that of its predecessor, Wario Land II. Wario must take advantage of his enemies' attacks to physically change and access new areas. For example, if Wario eats a donut thrown by a certain enemy, he temporarily bulks up to twice his size, giving him extra protection against attacks and the ability to break certain blocks. While Wario will always be affected by his enemies, he must also find new powers and abilities in order to progress through the game.

The world of the music box is divided into four different areas, East, West, North, and South, with a total of 25 individual stages spread between them. Each stage contains four treasures, for a total of 100, each of which is locked in a colored treasure chest that can only be opened with the corresponding key. The colors of the chests are, in the approximate order that they are intended to be opened, Gray, Red, Green, and Blue. This order is not fixed, although the game provides hints as to the next stage to travel to and the next treasure to obtain. Often, when a treasure chest in one stage cannot be reached, Wario must backtrack to retrieve a new item to make it accessible.

Finding new treasures usually opens a path to a new stage, or unlocks a new area in a previous stage. Some treasures grant Wario a new ability, allowing him to access previously unreachable areas. Whenever Wario obtains a new treasure, he is transported back to the music box overworld. Time alternates between day or night each time Wario exits a stage. Some stages change depending on the time of day; certain enemies may be replaced or different paths may open up. Wario cannot control time initially, but gains this ability when he finds a certain treasure.

In some stages, Wario will have to play a golfing minigame to progress. He must knock the enemy into the cup without going over par for that hole, while avoiding hazards such as water, bunkers, lava and rough. Upon collecting certain treasures in the game, this golf minigame is available to be played at any time from the overworld map.

Coins can be found in each stage, and are used primarily to play the golfing minigame described above. Wario can carry a maximum of 999 coins. In addition, eight Music Coins are hidden in each level for Wario to find. If all eight are found in each of the 25 stages, an extra fourth golf hole will be available for play.

As in the previous Wario Land game, Wario has no health points and cannot die; the lone exception is that he can get captured by the game's final boss, Rudy the Clown and get a game over. This simply returns Wario back to the music box overworld.

== Plot ==
One day, Wario's plane stalls and crashes while he is flying over the woods. Uninjured, he spends the rest of his afternoon wandering amongst the trees and underbrush until he stumbles upon a mysterious cave. Inside the cave, he discovers a magical music box and is suddenly sucked into it. There, a mysterious figure informs Wario that he had once ruled the world inside the music box, until an evil being sealed away his magical powers in five music boxes. In exchange for freeing it, the being promises to send Wario back to his own world and let him keep any treasure he finds. Enticed by the thought of returning to his own world with a cache of treasure, Wario departs on his quest, in search of the music boxes and the many treasures of this mysterious land.

After collecting all the music boxes, Wario returns to the mysterious being's temple. The music boxes play a medley together that frees the being, revealed to be Rudy the Clown. It transpires that Rudy is in fact the villain and had been imprisoned, although not before turning the music box's inhabitants into monsters, who had been attacking Wario simply to try to stop him from freeing the evil clown. After Wario defeats Rudy, he is met by the inhabitants of the music box, now restored to their former selves. They thank Wario and transport him back to his own world, along with the treasure that he has collected, as promised.

== Reception ==
Reception

Aggregate score
Aggregator	Score
GameRankings	90%

Review scores
Publication	Score
AllGame	4.5/5
Famitsu	8/10, 8/10, 9/10, 8/10
GameSpot	9.8/10
IGN	9/10
Nintendo Life	9/10
Nintendo Power	8.2/10
Nintendojo	10/10

Wario Land 3 was released in Japan for the Game Boy Color on March 21, 2000.

Wario Land 3 received highly positive reviews. It holds an aggregate score of 90% on GameRankings based on 15 reviews, making it the highest-rated game in the Wario series. It was a runner-up for GameSpot's annual "Best Game Boy Color Game" and "Best Platform Game" awards, losing to Dragon Warrior I & II and Banjo-Tooie, respectively.

GameSpot rated the game 9.8 out of 10, while IGN gave it an "outstanding" score of 9 out of 10. Nintendo Power ranked it ninth on its list of the best Game Boy titles, describing it as the pinnacle of Wario's early action-platform adventures. Nintendojo awarded it a perfect 10 out of 10 and called it one of the best platform games available for the Game Boy.

It was the 24th best-selling Game Boy title, with 2.2 million copies sold worldwide. In Japan, it ranked as the tenth best-selling Game Boy Color game, with 255,536 copies sold.

== Legacy ==
Rudy the Clown and several of Wario Land 3's enemies return as antagonists and playable characters in Dr. Mario 64 (2001).
