= Wario Land II =

1998 video game

- North American Game Boy box art
- Developer: Nintendo R&D1
- Publisher: Nintendo
- Director: Takehiko Hosokawa
- Producer: Takehiro Izushi
- Designer: Masani Ueda
- Programmers: Masaru Yamanaka; Katsuya Yamano; Nobuhiro Ozaki
- Artist: Hiroji Kiyotake
- Composer: Kozue Ishikawa
- Series: Wario Land
- Platforms: Game Boy, Game Boy Color
- Release: Game Boy: NA: March 9, 1998; EU: March 26, 1998; AU: May 15, 1998; Game Boy Color: JP: October 21, 1998; AU: December 23, 1998; NA: February 10, 1999; EU: February 25, 1999
- Genre: Platform
- Mode: Single-player

Wario Land II, known in Japan as Wario Land 2: The Stolen Treasure, (Note: Japanese: ワリオランド2 盗まれた財宝, Hepburn: Wario Rando Tsū: Nusumareta Zaihō) is a 1998 platform game developed and published by Nintendo for the Game Boy. Players control Wario as he sets out to recover his stolen treasure from Captain Syrup.

The gameplay retains the side-scrolling platforming of Wario Land: Super Mario Land 3, with the player guiding Wario through various levels with the goal of finishing with as many coins as possible. Wario Land II introduces an immortality game mechanic in which enemies cannot inflict damage, but instead cause Wario to lose coins or transform into forms with abilities that allow players to access new areas.

The original version was released for the Game Boy in North America and Europe in March 1998. A colorized version, sometimes called Wario Land II DX, was released in Japan in October 1998 as a launch game for the Game Boy Color, and later in other regions. It received positive reviews. The Game Boy Color version was rereleased as a Virtual Console game for the Nintendo 3DS in 2012.

== Gameplay ==
Wario dashes through a thin wall to find a secret room full of coins.

Wario Land II differs from many platformers of its era by emphasizing exploration and puzzle-solving over traditional mechanics like timers, health points, or limited lives. The game's challenge lies in navigating obstacles, solving environmental puzzles, and unlocking paths blocked by coins or treasure locks. Some levels feature hidden exits that can alter the storyline, unlock additional stages, and lead to different endings. A total of five alternate endings can be unlocked by collecting all treasures, in addition to the "Really Final Chapter".

Unlike most platformers, Wario is invincible, he cannot die. Instead, enemy attacks cause him to lose coins or undergo transformations. Certain transformations grant him new abilities that allow access to previously unreachable areas. For example, touching fire turns him into Hot Wario, enabling him to defeat enemies on contact and burn through obstacles.

The game also features a minigame based on the Game & Watch game Flagman, which becomes available after collecting all picture tiles. Unlike its predecessor, Wario Land: Super Mario Land 3, Wario Land II imposes no time limits, allowing players to explore levels at their own pace, a feature retained in later entries of the series.

== Plot ==
Following the events of the second-best ending in Wario Land: Super Mario Land 3, Captain Syrup and her minions, the Black Sugar Gang, infiltrate Wario's castle early one morning while he is still asleep. They steal his treasure and sabotage the castle by setting off his giant alarm clock and by leaving the tap running, flooding parts of the castle. After waking up and discovering the chaos, Wario quickly puts things in order and sets off in pursuit across the surrounding lands to reclaim his stolen treasure. After many close encounters, he eventually reaches their base, Syrup Castle, defeats Captain Syrup and reclaims his treasure.

Depending on the player's progress and choices, the game can conclude with one of several endings but they generally conclude with Wario safely back at his castle and his treasures returned. Eventually in the true final chapter, Wario returns to Syrup Castle and proceeds to a mountain range somewhere near the building. There he discovers a secret cave in which the pirates store their treasures. In a final raid, Wario overcomes the difficulties in the pirate cave and plunders Syrup's riches.

== Reception ==
Reception

Aggregate score
Aggregator	Score
GameRankings	GB: 80% GBC: 88%

Review scores
Publication	Score
AllGame	GBC: 4/5
Electronic Gaming Monthly	GB: 8.5/10, 8.5/10, 8/10, 9/10
IGN	GBC: 9/10
Nintendo Life	GBC: 9/10; 3DS: 9/10
Nintendo Power	7.5/10
Nintendo World Report	GBC: 9/10
Official Nintendo Magazine	GBC: 90/100

Awards
Publication	Award
PC Magazine	10 Best Game Boy Games
Electronic Gaming Monthly	Game of the Month (May 1998)

Wario Land II received acclaim. Electronic Gaming Monthly awarded it "Game of the Month," with reviewers praising its large scope, hidden secrets, and inventive gameplay. Dan Hsu highlighted the unconventional mechanic in which the player cannot die, noting that it leads to humorous outcomes that sometimes unlock new areas: "Wario Land II reminds me of so many old-school platformers, yet it's like nothing I've seen before."

The Game Boy Color version holds an aggregate score of 88% on GameRankings, based on 14 reviews. Writing for IGN, Alec Matias called it "the perfect game to accompany you on a long road trip because of its lastability and replayability". AllGame criticized the Game Boy Color version for lacking significant improvements beyond the addition of color, but praised its strong puzzle design and consistently solid platforming. Reviewing the Virtual Console re-release, Nintendo Life acknowledged the shift in gameplay from earlier entries but concluded that it is good once players adapt. In 2019, PC Magazine named Wario Land II one of the 10 best Game Boy games.
