= Nintendo Player's Guide =

Video game strategy guides by Nintendo

The Nintendo Player's Guides are a series of video game strategy guides from Nintendo based on Nintendo Power magazine.

== Original format ==
The first Player's Guide was simply named The Official Nintendo Player's Guide, featuring dozens of different NES games. The following 22 games were covered in depth, with enemy descriptions, level maps, and strategy tips.

- The Legend of Zelda
- Mike Tyson's Punch-Out!!
- Commando
- Super Mario Bros.
- Top Gun
- Ghosts 'n Goblins
- Double Dribble
- Zelda II: The Adventure of Link
- Metroid
- Rad Racer
- Ring King
- Kid Icarus
- Pro Wrestling
- Castlevania
- Excitebike
- Arkanoid
- Rush'n Attack
- Rygar
- Ikari Warriors
- Spy Hunter
- The Goonies II
- Kung-Fu Master

Screenshots and short descriptions of other games were also included. As an early published Nintendo work, it featured some errors, including referring to Metroid heroine Samus Aran as a male, and referring to the playable bar in Arkanoid as "Bowse" instead of the proper "Vaus", most likely the result of a translation mistake.

The Official Nintendo Player's Guide was followed in the early 1990s by a number of publications, which were produced under the slightly different moniker of Nintendo Power Strategy Guides. These were sent between the then bi-monthly magazine issues to subscribers or mailed alongside them. Nintendo Entertainment System games covered by their Strategy Guides included:

- Super Mario Bros. 3
- Ninja Gaiden II: The Dark Sword of Chaos
- Final Fantasy
- 4-Player Extra, which covered multiple four-player games on the NES.

Nintendo ceased production of these bimonthly Strategy Guides due to a lack of important game releases in the pre-holiday seasons of the year.

== Player's Guide ==
After converting Nintendo Power to a monthly format came the more well-known mainstay of Player's Guides. Early guides covered groups of games in one book. These books covered strategy for:

- NES Game Atlas
  - Castlevania
  - Castlevania II: Simon's Quest
  - Castlevania III: Dracula's Curse
  - Chip 'n Dale Rescue Rangers
  - DuckTales
  - The Legend of Zelda
  - Mega Man
  - Mega Man 2
  - Mega Man 3
  - Ninja Gaiden
  - Ninja Gaiden II: The Dark Sword of Chaos
  - StarTropics
  - Super Mario Bros.
  - Super Mario Bros. 2
  - Super Mario Bros. 3
  - Teenage Mutant Ninja Turtles
  - Teenage Mutant Ninja Turtles II: The Arcade Game
  - Zelda II: The Adventure of Link
- Game Boy
  - Batman
  - Castlevania: The Adventure
  - Cosmo Tank
  - Days of Thunder
  - Double Dragon
  - Dr. Mario
  - DuckTales
  - F1 Race
  - The Final Fantasy Legend
  - Fortified Zone
  - Gargoyle's Quest
  - Golf
  - Gremlins 2: The New Batch
  - The Hunt for Red October
  - Kwirk
  - Nemesis
  - Operation C
  - Quarth
  - R-Type
  - Revenge of the 'Gator
  - Super Mario Land
  - Teenage Mutant Ninja Turtles: Fall of the Foot Clan
  - Solar Striker
  - Solomon's Club
  - Super R.C. Pro-Am
  - The Sword of Hope
  - Tetris
  - Ultima: Runes of Virtue
- Mario Mania
  - Super Mario World, along with a history of the character, Mario.
- Super Nintendo Entertainment System
  - ActRaiser
  - Bill Laimbeer's Combat Basketball
  - Chessmaster
  - Darius Twin
  - Drakkhen
  - Extra Innings
  - F-Zero
  - Final Fantasy II
  - Final Fight
  - Gradius III
  - Home Alone
  - HyperZone
  - Joe & Mac
  - John Madden's Football
  - Hal's Hole in One Golf
  - Lagoon
  - The Legend of the Mystical Ninja
  - The Legend of Zelda: A Link to the Past
  - Miracle Piano Teaching System
  - Nolan Ryan's Baseball
  - Paperboy 2
  - Pilotwings
  - Pit-Fighter
  - Populous
  - RPM Racing
  - SimCity
  - Smash TV
  - Super Bases Loaded
  - Super Baseball Simulator 1.000
  - Super Castlevania IV
  - Super Ghouls 'n Ghosts
  - Super Mario World
  - Super Off Road
  - Super R-Type
  - Super Tennis
  - True Golf Classics: Waialae Country Club
  - Ultraman: Towards the Future
  - U.N. Squadron
  - Ys III: Wanderers from Ys
- Top Secret: Passwords

Outside of offering an optional Player's Guide as a free gift for a Nintendo Power subscription or subscription renewal, Nintendo Power did not include Player's Guides with the magazine. They were, however, made available separately, both through mail-order and at book and video-game shops. Nintendo did also once offer a subscription motive that included four of the aforementioned Player's Guides instead of only one.

Following these four Player's Guides, a fifth was released to Nintendo Power subscribers entitled Top Secret Passwords, containing passwords for a wide variety of NES, SNES, and Game Boy games. While initially billed as a subscriber exclusive, this guide was eventually sold at retailers.

== Later era ==
In its later years, each Player's Guide published features one specific game, much like the earlier Nintendo Power Strategy Guides. These Nintendo Power branded Player's Guides were available for Nintendo-published games as well as select high-profile third party titles, such as Final Fantasy III and Chrono Trigger, but the concept is now emulated by other publishing companies such as Brady Games or Prima for major releases on all video game consoles. Almost all major video games released today will have one or more official Guides associated with them.

While the rise of the World Wide Web and the increasing availability of free on-line FAQs and walkthroughs has taken away some of the need for commercial strategy guides, there is still a market for them. Guides often feature extensive picture-by-picture walkthroughs, maps, game art, and other visual features that cannot be provided by a bare text online walkthrough.

Among the games that have been given Nintendo Player's Guides:

- Animal Crossing
- Animal Crossing: Wild World
- Advance Wars: Dual Strike
- Advance Wars 2: Black Hole Rising
- Banjo-Kazooie
- Banjo-Tooie
- Battalion Wars
- Chrono Trigger
- Conker's Bad Fur Day
- Diddy Kong Racing
- Donkey Kong 64
- Donkey Kong Country
- Donkey Kong Country (Game Boy Advance version)
- Donkey Kong Country 2: Diddy's Kong Quest
- Donkey Kong Country 3: Dixie Kong's Double Trouble!
- EarthBound
- Eternal Darkness: Sanity's Requiem
- Final Fantasy I & II: Dawn of Souls
- Final Fantasy III (VI)
- Final Fantasy IV Advance
- Final Fantasy V Advance
- Final Fantasy Crystal Chronicles
- Final Fantasy Tactics Advance
- Fire Emblem: The Blazing Blade
- Fire Emblem: Path of Radiance
- Fire Emblem: The Sacred Stones
- F-Zero GX
- GoldenEye 007
- Golden Sun: The Lost Age
- Jet Force Gemini
- Killer Instinct
- The Legend of Zelda: Collector's Edition
- The Legend of Zelda: Four Swords Adventures
- The Legend of Zelda: Link's Awakening
- The Legend of Zelda: A Link to the Past
- The Legend of Zelda: A Link to the Past and Four Swords
- The Legend of Zelda: Majora's Mask
- The Legend of Zelda: The Minish Cap
- The Legend of Zelda: Ocarina of Time
- The Legend of Zelda: Oracle of Seasons and Oracle of Ages
- The Legend of Zelda: Twilight Princess
- The Legend of Zelda: The Wind Waker
- Luigi's Mansion
- Mario & Luigi: Partners in Time
- Mario & Luigi: Superstar Saga
- Mario Kart 64
- Mario Kart: Double Dash
- Mario Paint
- Metroid Fusion
- Metroid Prime
- Metroid Prime 2: Echoes
- Metroid Prime Hunters
- Metroid: Zero Mission
- New Super Mario Bros.
- Nintendogs
- Paper Mario
- Paper Mario: The Thousand-Year Door
- Perfect Dark
- Pikmin
- Pikmin 2
- Pokémon Battle Revolution
- Pokémon Colosseum
- Pokémon Crystal
- Pokémon Diamond and Pearl
- Pokémon Emerald
- Pokémon FireRed and LeafGreen
- Pokémon Gold and Silver
- Pokémon Mystery Dungeon
- Pokémon Ranger
- Pokémon Red and Blue
- Pokémon Ruby and Sapphire
- Pokémon Snap
- Pokémon Stadium
- Pokémon Stadium 2
- Pokémon Trading Card Game
- Pokémon Special Edition: Red, Blue & Yellow
- Pokémon XD: Gale of Darkness
- Star Fox 64
- Star Fox Adventures
- Star Fox Assault
- Star Wars Episode I: Racer
- Star Wars: Rogue Squadron
- Star Wars Rogue Squadron II: Rogue Leader
- Star Wars Rogue Squadron III: Rebel Strike
- Street Fighter II Turbo
- Super Game Boy
- Super Mario 64
- Super Mario Advance 4: Super Mario Bros. 3
- Super Mario All-Stars
- Super Mario RPG: Legend of the Seven Stars
- Super Mario Sunshine
- Super Mario World 2: Yoshi's Island
- Super Metroid
- Super Paper Mario
- Super Smash Bros. Melee
- Sword of Mana
- Wario World
- Wave Race: Blue Storm
- Yoshi's Island DS
- Yoshi's Island: Super Mario Advance 3
- Yoshi's Story

== Discontinuation ==
Around mid-2007, Nintendo discontinued the series after the publication of the guide for Pokémon Battle Revolution.

This end of guide production was apparently due to the impending switch from in-house publication of NP to publication by Future US, which occurred in November 2007.

In an issue of Nintendo Power, an NP subscriber wrote to Nintendo, asking about the status of the Player's Guide series. Nintendo replied that the series is indeed discontinued indefinitely. They also pointed out that Prima Games was their official partner for making strategy guides, which they have been making for the aforementioned recent releases. Additionally, Prima made special strategy guides for The Legend of Zelda: Phantom Hourglass and Mario Kart Wii. These guides were released exclusively as bonuses for Nintendo Power subscriptions or renewals. These guides even carry the label "Special Digest Version: Supplement to Nintendo Power Magazine".

== See also ==
- Game Boy
- Nintendo DS
- Nintendo Entertainment System
- Nintendo GameCube
- Nintendo 64
- Super Nintendo Entertainment System
- Wii
