= Wolf Kahler =

German actor (born 1940)

- Born: 3 April 1940 (age 86); Kiel, Germany
- Occupation: Actor
- Years active: 1975–present

Wolf Kahler (born 3 April 1940) is a German character actor in stage, film, television, and voice actor.

== Early life ==
Kahler was born in Kiel, Germany.

== Career ==
With blue eyes, sculpted jawbone, and height of 1.88 m (6 ft 2 in), Kahler was often chosen to play unsympathetic German characters or Nazis.

He appeared in the British production of The Adventures of Sherlock Holmes as the young Bohemian king in "A Scandal in Bohemia". Nearly thirty years later he would return to a Sherlock Holmes production in Guy Ritchie's film Sherlock Holmes: A Game of Shadows.

Since 1975, he has appeared in many English-language American and British television and film productions. One of his early roles was that of Kaiser Wilhelm II in Michael York's adventure film The Riddle of the Sands. One of his best-known roles was that of Hermann Dietrich in Raiders of the Lost Ark.

Among the characters he has voiced in video games is Kaiser Vlad in Battalion Wars. Kahler played the Prince of Tübingen in Stanley Kubrick's 1975 film, Barry Lyndon. In 2001, he played a Wehrmacht General in a television miniseries about World War II, Band of Brothers. In the Clint Eastwood spy thriller Firefox (1982), Kahler played KGB chairman Yuri Andropov. In 2011 Kahler appeared as Dr. Hoffmanstahl in Sherlock Holmes: A Game of Shadows. In 2017, he played a German Commander in the Warner Bros./DCEU film Wonder Woman.

== Personal life ==
Kahler is an expatriate living in London.

== Filmography ==
=== Film ===
- 1975 Barry Lyndon as Prince of Tübingen
- 1976 The Eagle Has Landed as SS Hauptsturmführer Fleischer (uncredited)
- 1977 March or Die as first German
- 1978 Force 10 from Navarone as German soldier at supply dump
- 1978 The Boys from Brazil as Schwimmer
- 1979 The Riddle of the Sands as Kaiser Wilhelm II
- 1979 The Lady Vanishes as Helmut von Reider
- 1980 Rough Cut as De Gooyer
- 1980 The Sea Wolves as Trompeta
- 1981 At the Fountainhead as Wolfgang Leonhard
- 1981 Raiders of the Lost Ark as Colonel Hermann Dietrich
- 1981 Priest of Love as German officer
- 1982 Firefox as KGB Chairman Andropov
- 1982 Remembrance as Dutch Matelot
- 1983 High Road to China as Von Hess
- 1983 Ascendancy as Muller
- 1983 The Keep as SS adjutant
- 1985 A Zed & Two Noughts as Felipe Arc-en-Ciel
- 1988 The Bourne Identity as Gold Glasses
- 1992 Shining Through as border commandant
- 1993 The Remains of the Day as Joachim von Ribbentrop
- 1994 Backbeat as Bert Kaempfert
- 1996 Loch Ness as Dr. Muller
- 1997 Firelight as Sussman
- 2000 Britannic as Captain Kruger
- 2001 The Lost Battalion as General Von Sybel
- 2001 Charlotte Gray as Oberleutenant Lindermann
- 2004 Bridget Jones: The Edge of Reason as Commentator
- 2010 Shanghai as German consul
- 2011 Sherlock Holmes: A Game of Shadows as Dr. Hoffmanstahl
- 2012 Full Firearms as Adam
- 2012 Cockneys vs Zombies as Nazi officer
- 2017 Wonder Woman as German commander
- 2017 Damascus Cover as Colonel Ludwig Streicher
- 2023 The Great Escaper as Heinrich

=== Short films ===
- 2008 Haber as Erich Ludendorff
- 2010 Stasi Dog as the narrator
- 2012 Cold Warrior as Bochinsky
- 2016 Millefeuille as Hans-Peter (Opa)
- 2016 Rubicon as Dirk Van de Cleef
- 2020 Cognition as Dr. Zoger
- 2025 Whispers of Freedom as Bruno Kabát

=== Television ===
- 1978 A Horseman Riding By episode 11 as Willi Meyer, a POW
- 1980 Don Siegel: Last of the Independents as himself
- 1980 The Sandbaggers as Lincke
- 1982 The Secret Adversary as the German
- 1982 Hess as Rudolf Hess
- 1984 The Adventures of Sherlock Holmes as King of Bohemia
- 1985 Space as Funkhauser
- 1985 The Dirty Dozen: Next Mission as General Sepp Dietrich
- 1987 The Dirty Dozen: The Deadly Mission as Colonel Krieger
- 1987 A Perfect Spy as Lieutenant Dollendorf
- 1988 War and Remembrance as SS Major Anton Burger
- 1992 The Young Indiana Jones Chronicles as German second at duel
- 1993 Soldier Soldier as Dr. Heller
- 1999 Kavanagh QC as Dieter Klausen
- 2000 Dalziel and Pascoe as Jurgen Falke
- 2001 Band of Brothers as German general
- 2001 Red Cap as General Joachim Ulmke
- 2004 London as German traveller
- 2005 The Girl in the Café (TV) as Herr Gerhardt
- 2006 The Somme - From Defeat to Victory as General Hans von Plessen
- 2008 George Gently – Bomber's Moon as Gunter Schmeikel
- 2014 Fleming: The Man Who Would Be Bond as Admiral Brandel
- 2019 BBC Look North (Yorkshire and North Midlands) as himself
- 2019 The Mallorca Files as Hans Weber

=== Video games ===
- 1998 Metal Gear Solid as Donald Anderson / Revolver Ocelot / Jim Houseman (German dub)
- 1999 Syphon Filter as Thomas Markinson (German dub)
- 2003 Tomb Raider: The Angel of Darkness as Grant Muller
- 2004 Half-Life 2 as Dr. Wallace Breen (German dub)
- 2005 Battalion Wars as Kaiser Vlad
- 2007 Battalion Wars 2 as Kaiser Vlad / Lord Ferrok
- 2008 The Club as Enemy Characters
- 2009 IL-2 Sturmovik: Birds of Prey as German Voice
- 2010 Kirby's Epic Yarn as The Narrator (German Version)
- 2011 Crysis 2 as Karl Ernst Rasch (German & English dub)
- 2013 Crysis 3 as Karl Ernst Rasch (German & English dub)
- 2013 Company of Heroes 2 as German Announcer
- 2015 Calvino Noir as Arno
- 2017 Raid: World War II as Dr. Maximillion Reihnhart
- 2018 Call of Cthulhu: The Official Video Game as Thomas Fuller
- 2019 Close to the Sun as Aubrey King
- 2022 Sniper Elite 5 as Abelard Möller

=== Thanks ===
- 2012 Raiding the Lost Ark: A Filmumentary (special thanks)

=== Soundtrack ===
- 2008 Inspector George Gently (performer: The Lambton Worm Song – Episode: "Bomber's Moon")

== Radio ==
The Scarlet Pimpernel of the Vatican, a drama by Robin Glendinning, was first broadcast in 2006, on BBC Radio4. Kahler played Herbert Kappler, a Nazi war criminal, who is befriended in his cell by a Vatican priest; the story is based on the real-life adventures of Monsignor Hugh O'Flaherty.
