= Game Boy Wars =

1991 video game

- Developers: Nintendo R&D1; Intelligent Systems
- Publisher: Nintendo
- Director: Hirofumi Matsuoka
- Producer: Satoru Okada
- Programmer: Toru Naruhiro
- Artist: Hirofumi Matsuoka
- Composer: Ryoji Yoshitomi
- Series: Wars
- Platform: Game Boy
- Release: JP: May 21, 1991
- Genre: Turn-based strategy
- Modes: Single-player, multiplayer

Game Boy Wars (Note: Japanese: ゲームボーイウォーズ, Hepburn: Gēmu Bōi Wōzu) is a 1991 turn-based strategy video game developed by Nintendo and Intelligent Systems and published by Nintendo for the Game Boy. Released only in Japan, it is a portable follow-up to the 1988 Family Computer war game Famicom Wars, making it the second game in Nintendo's Wars series. A series of sequels to the original Game Boy Wars were developed and released by Hudson Soft.

== Gameplay ==
Two countries, Red Star and White Moon, are warring against each other. The player takes control of forces from either on hexagonal maps with square tiles. As the commander, the player must direct their forces to either destroy all the enemy forces or capture the enemy's capital city. In pursuit of this goal, the player attempts to take control of the cities, factories, airports, and harbors on each map. There are a total of 36 maps in the game.

The player and their opponent (the CPU or another player) take turns (or phases) in moving their armies, which can deploy up to 50 units. Each of the units can be given an order, such as attacking enemy units, assisting friendly units, or conquering. Units can be land, sea, or air units, and can be deployed from near the player's capital using funds obtained from any of the player's properties. Land units can be sent out from cities or factories, air units from airports, and vessels from harbors. There are 24 different kinds of units that can be deployed by both armies.

== Reception ==
GamesRadar listed the Game Boy Wars series as one of the titles they wanted in the 3DS Virtual Console.

== Sequels ==
A series of sequels to the original Game Boy Wars were later published several years after the original game was released. These sequels were developed and published by Hudson Soft instead of Nintendo and Intelligent Systems.

=== Game Boy Wars Turbo ===
Game Boy Wars Turbo is an enhanced version of the original Game Boy Wars that was released on June 24, 1997. The main new feature in Game Boy Wars Turbo is that the CPU now has a better decision-making algorithm during its turns, allowing battles to proceed swifter than in the original. Turbo also features 50 new maps, as well as Super Game Boy support. Like some of Hudson's other Game Boy games at this time, the game was released exclusively in a tin, rather than the cardboard boxes of most Game Boy games.

An alternate version of Game Boy Wars Turbo was released as a promotional giveaway by Weekly Famitsu featuring a set of maps submitted by readers of the magazine.

=== Game Boy Wars 2 ===
Game Boy Wars 2, the second of the Game Boy Wars sequels by Hudson Soft, was released on November 20, 1998. It features support for the Super Game Boy and Game Boy Color. The CPU's decision-making algorithm has once again been improved and the game now displays which spaces the player can move into or attack when they're moving a unit, allowing for a clearer decision-making process for the player. There are 54 new maps in Game Boy Wars 2.

=== Game Boy Wars 3 ===
Reception

Review score
Publication	Score
Famitsu	7/10, 8/10, 8/10, 7/10

Game Boy Wars 3, the third and final Game Boy Wars sequel produced by Hudson, was released on August 30, 2001 (a month before the North American release of Advance Wars) for the Game Boy Color. The working title during the game's development was Game Boy Wars Pocket Tactics.

The gameplay of Game Boy Wars 3 is a departure from the previous Game Boy Wars titles, being modeled after the Nectaris series of war simulators that were also produced by Hudson. For example, indirect attack units can now move and attack at the same time in one turn. In contrast to the previous Game Boy Wars titles, having the required fund is not enough to produce certain units. The player must provide construction materials to the factories and cities as well. To do that, the player must deploy construction units to these sites and build the materials. These construction units can be used to cut down trees and create roads.

Game Boy Wars 3 features a Beginner Mode, which gives the player a 16-part tutorial on how to play the game, as well as a Standard Mode in which the player can fight against the CPU or another player in one of 60 maps. There's also a Campaign Mode in which the player must fight through over 45 different maps that are dictated by a storyline, which has several branching points determined by the player's performance. A feature exclusive to the Campaign Mode is the ability to redeploy surviving units from a previous battle into the next one. Units gain experience points through combat, allowing them to be promoted from one of five ranks (D, C, B, A, and S), increasing their strength. Units who reach an S rank can be transformed into a new type of unit. The game features support for the Mobile Adapter GB accessory, with players able to download new maps.
