= Advance Wars 1+2: Re-Boot Camp =

2023 video game remake

- Developer: WayForward
- Publisher: Nintendo
- Series: Wars
- Engine: Unity
- Platform: Nintendo Switch
- Release: April 21, 2023
- Genre: Turn-based strategy
- Modes: Single-player, multiplayer

Advance Wars 1+2: Re-Boot Camp is a 2023 turn-based strategy video game developed by WayForward and published by Nintendo for the Nintendo Switch. It is a remake of the first two titles in the Advance Wars series, Advance Wars (2001), and Advance Wars 2: Black Hole Rising (2003), both developed by Intelligent Systems. The game comes with the campaigns of these two games, as well as a Versus mode where 2–4 players can play with each other both online and offline. In both games, players control a variety of land, air, and sea-based units, each with their own strengths and weaknesses that need to be accounted for. They also take the role of various Commanding Officers who similarly have their own strengths and weaknesses with respect to both units and terrain.

Re-Boot Camp was originally slated for a December 2021 release, but it was delayed to April 2022, only to be delayed indefinitely in March 2022 due to the Russian invasion of Ukraine. The game was eventually released on April 21, 2023 and received generally positive reviews from critics.

== Gameplay ==
Advance Wars 1+2: Re-Boot Camp is a remake of Advance Wars (2001), and Advance Wars 2: Black Hole Rising (2003), which were originally developed by Intelligent Systems. It is a turn-based strategy game where the player controls commanding officers from different regions. Each map is tiled, and units move one tile at a time, with each unit having different movement ranges, aim ranges, and terrain interaction, e.g. foot soldier units have a smaller movement range than all other units, but can move onto a Mountain and benefit from its terrain defense bonus. Meanwhile, Wood terrain causes most units to move fewer tiles in a turn when they move through them. Fog of war and weather may also limit unit movement. Water-based units like Destroyers and Battleships can only traverse water, and the only other units that can traverse water are aerial units, whose movements ignore terrain movement penalties, but do not receive terrain defense bonuses of any kind. Land-based units can only cross water by entering Transport Copters and Landers. Units have limited amounts of ammo and gas, which can be replenished by moving into any building under the player's control. If a naval or aerial unit ever runs out of fuel, it explodes the next turn and is removed from the map.

Players can choose from multiple Commanding Officers (CO), each with their own strengths, often involving advantages with certain units or terrains. The big differences tend to be their CO Power. In Advance Wars, each CO has their own unique CO Power. For example, Andy has a CO Power that recovers his units' HP, while Sami has a CO Power that boosts her Infantry and Mech units' movement, defense, and offense, and Eagle has a CO Power that allows his units, except Infantries and Mechs, to move again if they have moved during his current turn. These CO Powers can be activated once a meter is filled up, which is done by getting one's units engaged in battle, whether attacking or defending. Advance Wars 2: Black Hole Rising adds a Super CO Power to each CO, which requires players to let the CO Meter charge for longer before using.

Units are generated by spending money on certain buildings, such as bases for foot soldier and land vehicle units, to make them appear there. More powerful units are more expensive to purchase, and players gain a certain amount of money per building per turn. Players can increase the amount of money obtained by capturing more cities. Only foot soldier units can capture cities, with their capture rate depending on their current HP. Each building has 20 HP, which means that a full health foot soldier unit can capture a building in two turns. Players can also capture bases, airports, and seaports for the purpose of generating land, air, and naval units respectively.

Units have different levels of defense and offense, with foot soldier units being the most vulnerable. Units have varying ranges, with most units only able to attack adjacent enemy units (one square away; diagonal not counted). Units like Artillery, Battleships, and Rocket Launchers are able to aim further, though attacking units up close may be more difficult. When a unit attacks another unit, the attacking unit gets to do more damage as a bonus for going first. Each unit has a maximum of 10 health points; if a unit's HP ever reaches 0, that unit is permanently removed from the map. Units with lower HP also do less damage. Damage is also influenced by the kind of terrain occupied; a Tank unit fighting an enemy Tank unit in the woods will do less damage than when attacking an enemy Tank unit on the road. Some units also have secondary weapons, e.g. a Mech uses rocket weapons when attacking vehicles, but when up against an Infantry, machine guns are used instead. The only way to recover the unit's health is by moving it into any building owned by the player. Units can also run out of ammo, which can be refilled the same way. In order to win, players must route their opponents by either removing all of their units from the map or capturing their headquarters.

Advance Wars 1+2: Re-Boot Camp includes a Versus mode that supports both local and online multiplayer, and a map maker, which allows players to make custom maps that can be shared with other players. Up to four players can play together locally, whereas up to two players can play together online if they are registered on their Nintendo Switch friends list.

== Plot ==
The collection has two different plots, one for each game. The plotlines of the original games remained largely the same with very minor changes. Players take the role of a tactical advisor to any of the available commanding officers for each mission. Depending on the chosen mission, the story may diverge, though this does not affect the main story in any way.

=== Advance Wars ===
The setting takes place in Cosmo Land. The story starts in the Orange Star territory during an invasion by the Blue Moon Army under Olaf's command. Orange Star Army chief CO Nell calls in Andy to help repel the invasion. When Max and Sami join the battle against Blue Moon, the situation continues to escalate as Gold Comet and Green Earth also declare war on Orange Star. During a battle between Orange Star and Green Earth, Eagle accuses Andy of having committed an act of aggression against Green Earth. The four nations eventually learn from Sonja that another nation, the malicious Black Hole, created a clone of Andy to launch a false flag attack on the other three nations in order to frame Orange Star for the attack, causing all four nations to engage in a war on each other and allowing the Black Hole Army to better initiate an invasion. The four nations later set up their differences when Sonja is kidnapped by the Black Hole Army, and team up to defeat Black Hole and its leader, Sturm. At the end of the battle, Sturm is defeated and has escaped while Andy, Max and Sami break into the Black Hole HQ to save Sonja.

=== Advance Wars 2: Black Hole Rising ===
This story takes place in Macro Land. The story starts with Orange Star, Blue Moon, Green Earth and Gold Comet all trying to recover from the previous war, when suddenly the Black Hole Army initiates an attack on their territories. Their leader from the previous war, Sturm, has returned, along with his four CO recruits: Flak, Lash, Adder, and Hawke. Once the Black Hole troops are driven off the Allied Nations' territories, the Allied Nations armies convene and initiate an attack on the Black Hole territory in order to put an end to Black Hole's acts of aggression. Eventually, they all get to fight Sturm, the mastermind of the invasion, before he can destroy half of the world with his super weapon, the Death Ray. At the end of the battle, Sturm is defeated, with the Death Ray disarmed and destroyed. In an act of desperation, Sturm attempts to blow up the base by self-destructing the missile, hoping to be able to inflict damage to the rest of the world, only to be killed by Hawke before he could ever trigger the self-destruct sequence. Hawke declares that he will take over the Black Hole Army for the time being.

== Release ==
The game was announced during Nintendo's E3 2021 Nintendo Direct on June 15, with a release date of December 3 the same year.

The game was delayed to April 8, 2022, prior to the December 2021 release and then delayed indefinitely on March 9, 2022, due to the Russian invasion of Ukraine. Due to a mistake on Nintendo's part, one player's Nintendo Switch had a redemption code for the game that caused the game to be downloaded to it in a playable state. However, Nintendo later issued her a refund and revoked access from the game on April 14.

Another release date of April 21, 2023 was announced in February 2023, and it eventually released on that date.

== Reception ==
Reception

Aggregate scores
| Aggregator | Score |
|---|---|
| Metacritic | 83/100 |
| OpenCritic | 87% recommend |

Review scores
| Publication | Score |
|---|---|
| Destructoid | 8.5/10 |
| Digital Trends | 4/5 |
| Game Informer | 8.5/10 |
| GameSpot | 7/10 |
| Hardcore Gamer | 4/5 |
| IGN | 8/10 |
| Nintendo Life | 9/10 |
| Nintendo World Report | 8.5/10 |
| NME | 4/5 |
| RPGFan | 85/100 |
| Shacknews | 8/10 |
| The Telegraph | 4/5 |
| TouchArcade | 4/5 |
| Video Games Chronicle | 4/5 |

Advance Wars 1+2: Re-Boot Camp received "generally favorable" reviews", according to review aggregator website Metacritic. Fellow review aggregator OpenCritic assessed that the game received strong approval, being recommended by 87% of critics.

Polygon praised the amount of content available, writing, "For newcomers, it's a massive amount of content; for returning Advance Wars fans, it's a highly polished way to replay dozens of familiar scenarios". The Verge liked the remake's new aesthetic, "The maps are like colorful versions of what you might see in a high-end hobby shop, with grass that looks like green felt and surprisingly realistic water effects". Jadarina from IGN Nordic mentioned that the number of variables that can be changed makes each match feel unique.

Eurogamer felt that the portrayal of war felt a little out of touch in the modern day, writing that they feel, "conflicted in a murkier way about Advance Wars". While GameSpot enjoyed the various multiplayer modes, they felt that lack of a rewind feature was a missed opportunity, "if you make a mistake, sometimes the best course of action is to restart the battle, which could cost you hours over the duration of a campaign".

A common criticism of this release is directed towards its multiplayer. Ozzie Mejia of Shacknews, despite giving a positive review to the game overall, states that the multiplayer experience was "definitely disappointing" and "subpar". Jada Griffin of IGN, likewise positive overall, stated that "the biggest miss is the lack of multiplayer matchmaking, which makes it harder to get into a game than it ought to be in 2023".
