= Famicom Wars =

1988 video game

- Cover art
- Developers: Nintendo R&D1; Intelligent Systems
- Publisher: Nintendo
- Directors: Satoru Okada; Kenji Nishizawa
- Producer: Gunpei Yokoi
- Programmer: Toru Narihiro
- Artists: Hiroji Kiyotake; Hirofumi Matsuoka
- Composers: Hirokazu Tanaka; Kenji Yamamoto
- Series: Wars
- Platform: Family Computer
- Release: JP: August 12, 1988
- Genre: Turn-based tactics
- Mode: Single-player

Famicom Wars (Note: Japanese: ファミコンウォーズ, Hepburn: Famikon Wōzu) is a turn-based strategy video game developed by Nintendo and Intelligent Systems and published by Nintendo for the Family Computer. It was released on August 12, 1988, in Japan. It was later re-released on Virtual Console and for the Nintendo Switch as a part of the Nintendo Classics service. It is the first game in the Wars series.

== Gameplay ==
Players take control of one of two warring nations, Red Star and Blue Moon, as they seek to establish turn-based dominance over each other. After selecting which stage to start the game and setting which, if either, player will be controlled by a person, the Red Star army is given the first turn. The objective in each stage is to either capture the enemy's headquarters or destroy all remaining enemy units in one turn. During each turn, the player is given a certain amount of funds which can be used to build units in factories, seaports, and airports under their command; additional funds are earned by conquering cities near their headquarters. Each unit has their own speciality and unique abilities, with ten land units (including two foot soldier units), four air units, and two sea units. Some units have heavier firepower than others, while others provide support to allies. Only foot soldier units are capable of conquering cities, which can then be used to repair or refuel damaged units. There are 15 maps available at the start of the game, with two secret ending maps dependent on which nation the player fights for when playing against the computer.

== Development ==
Development of Famicom Wars began as Intelligent Systems changed its direction from creating hardware to developing simulation games.

== Reception and legacy ==
Reception

Review scores
Publication	Score
Famitsu	8/10, 9/10, 8/10, 8/10
Famicom Hisshoubon	4/5

On release, Famicom Tsūshin four reviewers all complimented Famicom Wars. They all found it actively distinguishing itself from other simulation games which they described as dull or difficult to understand with information portrayed as numeric data. Two reviewers complimented the graphics and animation, with one saying the battle animations are realistic which will get the player more into the action. The 1989 "All Soft Catalog" issue of Famicom Tsūshin included Famicom Wars in its list of the best games of all time, giving it the Best Simulation and Best Commercial awards.

The original Famicom Wars was followed by a series of sequels which were released only in Japan as well, which includes Game Boy Wars in 1990 and Super Famicom Wars in 1998, both which were developed by Intelligent Systems and Nintendo, as opposed to a sub-series of sequels to the original Game Boy Wars, which were developed and published by Hudson Soft. The series eventually made its international debut with Advance Wars, released for the Game Boy Advance in 2001. The maps from both Famicom Wars and Super Famicom Wars were later included in Advance Wars and its sequels.

A group of six soldiers from the game appears in the Wii game Captain Rainbow. The soldiers aspire to win the volleyball gold medal.
