= Intelligent system =

Intelligent system may refer to:

- Intelligent Systems, a game developer
- a system with artificial intelligence
