= Pictonico! =

2026 video game

- Developers: Nintendo EPD; Intelligent Systems
- Publisher: Nintendo
- Engine: Unity
- Platforms: iOS; Android
- Release: WW: May 28, 2026
- Genre: Party

Pictonico! (Note: Japanese: ピクトニコ！, Hepburn: Pikutoniko!) is a 2026 minigame compilation video game developed by Nintendo EPD and Intelligent Systems and published by Nintendo for iOS and Android. The game allows users to turn their photos into a game. Pictonico! released on May 28, 2026, receiving mixed or average reviews from critics.

== Gameplay ==
Pictonico! is a mobile video game where players can take pictures using their camera or use their pictures on their phone and turn them into WarioWare-style minigames. Each minigame lasts a few seconds and is controlled with the device's touch screen. The minigame alters the selected image for use in the game, similar to that in the Nintendo 3DS game Face Raiders. Around 80 minigames are available in total when each of the minigame volumes are purchased. The game progresses stage-by-stage but also features several additional game modes in the Score Attack challenge mode: a Normal mode where the difficulty of the game ramps up as the game progresses, a High Speed mode where the games go at a faster pace, and a Danger Zone mode where players are only given one chance to pass the games.

== Development and release ==
Pictonico! was developed by Nintendo EPD and by Intelligent Systems, the developers behind the WarioWare series of games.

Pictonico! was announced on May 18, 2026, through a trailer on the Nintendo Today! app showcasing the minigames alongside the release date of May 28, 2026 for iOS and Android.

Similar to Super Mario Run, the game is free to download and start, but only a handful of minigames can be played for free as a demo. The full game must be purchased via two separate minigame "volumes". Unlike Super Mario Run, the game does not require a constant active internet connection; it is needed only for the first launch, changing languages, and when purchasing and downloading minigame volumes. According to Nintendo, no photos are sent to the company's servers.

== Reception ==
Reception

Aggregate score
Aggregator	Score
Metacritic	74/100 (Note: Score based on 9 reviews)

Review score
Publication	Score
Nintendo Life	8/10

Pictonico! received "mixed or average" reviews according to review aggregation website Metacritic.

Gavin Lane of Nintendo Life rated the game a 8/10, calling the game an "effective translation of the WarioWare series on a platform it was born to be on," positively comparing the minigame selection to the WarioWare series and welcoming the element of randomness when choosing pictures for each minigame while acknowledging the expensive price for the minigame packs.

Cheyenne MacDonald from Engadget called Pictonico! a "ridiculous, undeniably joyful experience", praising the wackiness of the game as well as how the game uses the photos. She also initially expressed concerns about the game using photos stored on the device, but acknowledges that the game has features in place to only show the photos that is allowed to be shown in the game as well as being able to take pictures on the spot for use in the game.

In a more mixed review, Joel Petterson from Gamereactor rated the game a 5/10. He praised the idea of the game, calling it "the desire to turn something as mundane as your photo library into something tactile and silly", but even though it could be enjoyable in short play sessions, he also acknowledges that the game gets repetitive over time. He also expresses that the game lacks an identity, stating that the game is "very much like WarioWare, but without Wario", and that of "what usually gives this type of game its personality and energy is missing".
