= Link 'n' Launch =

2009 video game

- Cover art
- Developer: Intelligent Systems
- Publisher: Nintendo
- Platform: Nintendo DSi
- Release: JP: November 11, 2009; NA: February 8, 2010; PAL: August 6, 2010
- Genre: Puzzle
- Mode: Single-player

Link 'n' Launch, released in Japan as Panel Connection: 3 Minute Rocket (Note: Japanese: パネル連結 3分ロケット, Hepburn: Paneru Renketsu 3 fun Roketto), is a puzzle video game developed by Intelligent Systems and published by Nintendo for the Nintendo DSi's DSiWare service. It was released in Japan on November 11, 2009, North America on February 8, 2010 and PAL territories on August 6, 2010.

== Gameplay ==
Link 'n' Launch is a puzzle video game where the player controls a spaceship by diverting fuel through pipes, arriving at a destination planet within three minutes. Pipes of numerous shapes can be rotated to ensure fuel flows into the ship's tanks and power its two thrusters; powering up either thruster or both enables the ship to respectively travel diagonally or straight up. A puzzle mode without the time limit is available.

== Reception ==
Corbie Dillard of Nintendo Life gave the game a 7/10 score, praising its innovative game design and criticizing its repetitive nature. Matthew Blundon of Nintendo World Report gave the game a 8.5/10 score, praising its replay value and amount of content. Craig Harris of IGN gave the game a 9/10 score, praising its addictive gameplay and noted it to be one of the best games on the DSiWare service.
