= Super Famicom Wars =

- Title screen
- Developer: Intelligent Systems
- Publisher: Nintendo
- Director: Toru Narihiro
- Producer: Takehiro Izushi
- Designer: Shouzou Kaga
- Artist: Masahiro Higuchi
- Composer: Kenichi Nishimaki
- Series: Wars
- Platform: Super Famicom
- Release: JP: May 1, 1998
- Genre: Turn-based tactics
- Modes: Single-player, multiplayer

Super Famicom Wars is an enhanced remake of Famicom Wars developed by Intelligent Systems and released for the Super Famicom on May 1, 1998, exclusively via the Nintendo Power service in commemoration of the tenth anniversary of the original Family Computer version.

== Gameplay ==
Improvements over the original Famicom Wars include the inclusion of 8 new types of units in addition to the 16 original units, a faster decision-making process for the CPU, the introduction of Reconnaissance Mode (also known as "Fog of War" mode in later localizations, in which enemy units are invisible during the player's turn when they're not in proximity to the player's units) and the maximum amount of deployed units being increased from 48 to 60 units. In addition to the original campaign between the Red Star and Blue Moon armies, there's a new campaign also consisting of 17 maps involving two new factions, Green Earth and Yellow Comet. In addition there is a 4-players mode consisting of 10 maps involving all four factions. This brings the total count of maps to 44. The player can also assign one of seven generals to each army, which mainly affects what kind of strategies the CPU will employ, although some of the generals do provide passive benefits even when assigned to a player-controlled faction.

== Release ==
The game was digitally released on Nintendo's Japanese Virtual Console for Wii, Wii U, and 3DS platforms.

An English-language fan translation was released on December 24, 2017.
