= Advance Wars 2: Black Hole Rising =

2003 video game

- North American box art
- Developer: Intelligent Systems
- Publisher: Nintendo
- Directors: Makoto Shimojo; Kentaro Nishimura
- Producers: Toru Narihiro; Takehiro Izushi
- Programmer: Takanori Hino
- Artist: Ryo Hirata
- Writers: Masayuki Horikawa; Kouhei Maeda; Makoto Shimojo
- Composer: Yoshito Hirano
- Series: Wars
- Platform: Game Boy Advance
- Release: NA: June 23, 2003; AU: July 10, 2003; EU: October 3, 2003; JP: November 25, 2004 (as part of Game Boy Wars Advance 1+2)
- Genre: Turn-based strategy
- Modes: Single-player, multiplayer

Advance Wars 2: Black Hole Rising (Note: Known in Japan as Game Boy Wars Advance 2 (Japanese: ゲームボーイウォーズアドバンス2, Hepburn: Gēmu Bōi Wōzu Adobansu Tsū)) is a turn-based strategy video game developed by Intelligent Systems and published by Nintendo for the Game Boy Advance. It was released in North America and PAL regions in 2003. It is the second game in the Advance Wars sub-series of Nintendo Wars. It is preceded by Advance Wars and followed by Advance Wars: Dual Strike. Despite being developed in the region, the original Japanese release was canceled, but the game was later released in the region alongside the original Advance Wars as part of a compilation cartridge called Game Boy Wars Advance 1+2 in 2004. The game was released on the Wii U's Virtual Console in North America and Europe in 2015. At E3 2021, Nintendo announced that Black Hole Rising, alongside the original Advance Wars, would be remade and released together for the Nintendo Switch by WayForward in another compilation titled Advance Wars 1+2: Re-Boot Camp.

Black Hole Rising is nearly identical to the previous game in terms of core gameplay; there was only a small change in overall graphical style and some small content additions. The storyline of this game continues from the previous game, Advance Wars. Black Hole has quickly recovered from its defeat in Cosmo Land, and has gathered forces to invade Macro Land under the command of Sturm, the same commander who led the invasion of Cosmo Land. The protagonists, the Allied Nations, cooperate once again to drive the Black Hole forces out of Macro Land once and for all.

The game received positive reviews, and won the European Computer Trade Show's Best Handheld Game of the Year award in 2003.

== Gameplay ==
The goal of the player in Black Hole Rising, common to all of the Nintendo Wars series, is to defeat all of the enemies, sometimes by completing special objectives. Generally, the player can win by defeating all of the enemy's troops, or by capturing the enemy's headquarters. In certain campaign maps, there are special objectives, such as capturing or destroying certain key buildings, such as a Black Cannon, a new property found in Black Hole Rising.

=== Campaign mode ===
The Campaign mode in Black Hole Rising differs from its predecessor Advance Wars in that the mission selection is non-linear. The campaign takes place over the game's five continents, each focusing on one of the five countries in the game. The player plays as one or more commanding officers of the protagonist nations, fighting against the antagonist of the game, Black Hole. Each continent begins with several missions that the player can select from. Upon meeting certain requirements, new missions may become available. When the regular campaign has been completed, a more difficult Hard Campaign, in the vein of Advance Wars's Advance Campaign, can be unlocked, generally featuring modified maps and starting units.

Completion of a campaign mission or War Room will net the player a rank based on several criteria. When the campaign is completed, the player is given an overall rank, rewarding higher ranks with more unlockable content in the in-game shop.

In this War Room map featuring Pipelines and Missile Silos, the Infantry on the left is launching a missile that will damage all units within the cursor on the right. The Orange Star army also has two of this game's new unit, the Neotank.

=== Other modes ===
Many of Black Hole Rising's additional modes remains unchanged from its predecessor. In War Room Players are put in maps wherein they must defeat enemies who are usually given an advantage at the start. Versus mode allows the players to use either a pre-existing map or a user-created map and set up a game with customized settings. Versus mode can be used to create games played against the computer AI or other players by using hotseat gameplay. Multiplayer games with more than one game console is possible with Link mode, and requires the use of a Game Boy Advance Game Link Cable.

In Design mode, players can edit color palettes for existing commanding officers (after the player has unlocked the palettes) or create their own maps. In the map editor, the size of the map is fixed and the player cannot choose to use any of the new Black Hole buildings introduced in Black Hole Rising. There are also certain rules the player must adhere to in order for the map to be considered playable. Maps created in this mode can be saved on the game cartridge and can be played in multiplayer modes or sent and received to other game cartridges using multiple consoles with a Game Boy Advance Game Link Cable.

Battle Maps remains as the game's shop, allowing players to purchase new content for the game by spending points earned in the other game modes. New content becomes available for purchase as the player progresses in the game. Available content for purchase includes new commanding officers, maps, and palettes to allow players to recolor commanding officers in Design mode.

=== New features ===
Black Hole Rising is nearly identical to the previous game in terms of core gameplay; the only additions were to the overall content of the game. Eight new commanding officers join the original game's eleven to make a total of nineteen. Many new maps were added for Versus mode and War Room, although most of the new maps and commanding officers are not available for use at the start of the game, and must be purchased from the in-game shop after certain conditions are met.

Only one new unit, the Neotank, was added to the original set in Advance Wars. Two new terrain features were introduced: the Missile Silo and the Pipeline (along with its breakable Pipe Seams). The Missile Silo can be fired by foot troops to deal area of effect damage, and pipelines act as impassable walls. Because of its function as a wall, players can use it to create maps smaller than the default dimension the map editor provides, something that was not possible in the game's predecessor.

Along with the two terrain features, various new special Black Hole buildings were also introduced in Black Hole Rising, although they are only found in the game's campaign. These properties directly affected the gameplay of missions they are found in, creating new objectives for the player such as destroying or capturing one of these special buildings. An example of such a building is the large Black Cannon, which fires on one non-Black Hole unit each turn, dealing damage to it. Destructible properties such as the Black Cannon have "health", represented by a heart icon. When units attack the property, the number decreases; when it reaches zero, the property is destroyed.

One of the key added features of Black Hole Rising over its predecessor is the Super CO Power. The CO Power, introduced in Advance Wars, was a special ability unique to each commanding officer that could be triggered as the commanding officer's CO Meter filled by battle. CO Powers affected the game either by providing benefits for allied units and/or by inflicting negative effects on the enemy's units. Black Hole Rising changed the format of the CO Meter to use small and large stars, although it essentially still functions as a fillable meter. A regular CO Power is still available by filling the small stars, but a more powerful Super CO Power, introduced in Black Hole Rising, can be triggered by filling the large stars as well.

Although a Super CO Power is in many cases better than the normal CO Power, the CO Meter is drained differently depending on which power was activated. While Super CO Power will drain the CO Meter completely, the normal CO Power would leave players with some leftover charge on the CO Meter depending on how much existed before the CO Power. This allows for more strategy than Advance Wars since the player must now decide between using weaker abilities more frequently or greater abilities less frequently.

== Plot ==
While the Allied Nations were still recovering from the war in Cosmo Land, the Black Hole Army had already recovered and has decided to launch a large-scale invasion on Macro Land. Along with the original Black Hole army's commanding officers (COs), four new COs were recruited, under the command of Sturm: Flak, Black Hole's strongman in charge of invading Orange Star; Lash, a girl genius having invented most of Black Hole's technologies, invading Blue Moon; Adder, a narcissistic commander in charge of invading Yellow Comet; and Hawke, Black Hole's second-in-command and Sturm's most trusted ally. Sturm orders each Black Hole CO to invade and capture each of the four continents controlled by the four other armies from the original game: Orange Star was to be taken by Flak, Blue Moon by Lash, Yellow Comet by Adder, and Green Earth by Hawke. Lash also invented several new war weapons like the Black Cannon and the Mini Cannons that were to be put to use in this invasion. The four allied armies must now work together to drive Black Hole out of their world once and for all.

Once the Black Hole troops are driven from the Allied Nations' continents, their COs convene in Black Hole territory, near Black Hole's base of operations. Here they fight Sturm, the mastermind behind the invasion. The final battle takes place in front of the Death Ray, a powerful new weapon guarding the entrance to a missile, which, if not subdued in time, would destroy half of Wars World.

The Death Ray is eventually destroyed by the COs of the Allied Nations, who manage to disarm the missile and corner Sturm. In an act of desperation, Sturm attempts to blow up the base and inflict damage on Wars World by self-destructing the missile. Andy attempts to stop Sturm to no avail. However, in a surprising turn of events, Hawke, second in command to Sturm, betrays his leader by killing him with Black Storm before the self-destruct is triggered. Hawke takes over as leader of Black Hole, and along with Flak, Lash, and Adder, leaves Macro Land with the few troops he has left.

== Development ==
After the success of Advance Wars, Intelligent Systems, the company that created the original game, began designing a sequel to Advance Wars. It was originally announced in January 2003 under the title Advance Wars 2 to be released in North America in June of that year. Super Mario Club was to conduct testing, and Nintendo would publish the game. As Advance Wars was not released in Japan, Black Hole Rising was also unreleased in Japan, despite the fact the games were developed there. Later, before the launch of Advance Wars: Dual Strike, the games were released in Japan on a single cartridge, Game Boy Wars Advance 1+2 for the Game Boy Advance as well as the GBA game for the Wii U Virtual Console, which contained both of the games. The Japanese release had minor graphical differences, mostly in the portraits of the commanding officers.

When screenshots of the game were released in April of that year, it was seen that the original graphic style of Advance Wars would stay unchanged, and one could guess that changes would mostly be cosmetic. When a demo of the game was released at E3, it was clear that the gameplay would stay nearly identical to its predecessor Advance Wars, though new content would be added. IGN journalist Craig Harris commented after E3 2003 that "Black Hole Rising doesn't have an overwhelming sense of newness".

== Reception ==
Reception

Aggregate score
Aggregator	Score
Metacritic	89/100

Review scores
Publication	Score
1Up.com	B+
Edge	8/10
Electronic Gaming Monthly	8.17/10
Eurogamer	(Standalone) 9/10 (Rehash) 6/10
Game Informer	9.25/10
GamePro	4/5
GameSpot	9.1/10
GameSpy	4/5
GameZone	9.2/10
IGN	9/10
Nintendo Power	4.6/5
The Village Voice	8/10

Black Hole Rising received "generally favorable reviews" according to the review aggregation website Metacritic. GameSpot said: "No GBA owner should be without it, and anyone getting their hands on a new GBA for the first time should make playing Advance Wars 2 one of their first orders of business". The publication later named it the best Game Boy Advance game of June 2003.

IGN praised it as "one of the finest games to hit the Game Boy Advance". GameNOW called it "definitely one of the meatiest handheld games out there", and said that it "really shines" when played against human opponents for long periods of time. 1Up.com praised the core gameplay of the series, stating that "The game has changed just enough to please loyal fans, and when you've got a formula that makes for such a compelling gaming experience, why mess with it?"

The criticism received generally faulted the game's similarity to its predecessor. GameSpot commented that one could "cynically call it a rehash", and IGN stated that "the number 2 in the title honestly doesn't deserve to be there". Eurogamer had similar comments about the game, claiming "it's a classic, but it's so obviously a £35 mission pack, and is probably double the price it should have been". GameSpy's Michael Vreeland thought the game "feels a bit too similar to the first game".

The game received Editor's Choice awards from both GameSpot and IGN. It also received the Best Handheld Game of the Year 2003 award at the European Computer Trade Show. During the AIAS' 7th Annual Interactive Achievement Awards, Black Hole Rising was nominated for Handheld Game of the Year.
