= Wars (series) =

- Genres: Turn-based strategy Real-time strategy
- Developers: Intelligent Systems; Hudson Soft; Kuju Entertainment; WayForward Technologies
- Publisher: Nintendo
- Platforms: Famicom, Virtual Console, Game Boy, Super Famicom, Game Boy Color, Game Boy Advance, Nintendo DS, GameCube, Wii, Switch
- First release: Famicom Wars; August 12, 1988
- Latest release: Advance Wars 1+2: Re-Boot Camp; April 21, 2023

The Wars series, also known as Famicom Wars (Note: Japanese: ファミコンウォーズ, Hepburn: Famikon Wōzu) and Advance Wars, (Note: Japanese: ゲームボーイウォーズ, Hepburn: Gēmu Bōi Wōzu; "Game Boy Wars") is a series of military-themed turn-based strategy video games, predominantly developed by Intelligent Systems and published by Nintendo. The series debuted in Japan in August 1988 with the original Famicom Wars, followed by sequels on the Super Famicom and Game Boy. These early installments were released in Japan, with Advance Wars (2001) being the first to reach the North American and European markets. Advance Wars was released in the United States on September 10, 2001, but put on hold in Japan and Europe due to the September 11 attacks. Although released in Europe in January 2002, neither Game Boy Advance game was released in Japan until the Game Boy Wars Advance 1+2 compilation, which released for the Game Boy Advance on November 25, 2004. The success of Advance Wars in the West is frequently credited as a driving force for Nintendo bringing Intelligent Systems' franchise Fire Emblem outside of Japan, as both series share a similar tactical gameplay style.

In 2005, Advance Wars: Dual Strike was released on the Nintendo DS family of systems, which followed and expanded on the basic format of its predecessors. That same year Battalion Wars, developed by Kuju Entertainment, was released for the GameCube in Japan under the title Totsugeki!! Famicom Wars, where it is considered a spin-off from the main series. Battalion Wars is a 3D action real-time strategy game, as opposed to the turn-based strategy of the main series. An expanded sequel for the Wii, Battalion Wars 2 was released two years later. The last major title in the franchise, Advance Wars: Days of Ruin, was released internationally for the DS in 2008 and departed from the series' light hearted tone. Like the two Game Boy Advance titles preceding it, the game was canceled in Japan following a series of delays until it finally released as a downloadable game in 2013. At E3 2021, over a decade after the release of Days of Ruin, a collection of remakes of both Advance Wars games, titled Advance Wars 1+2: Re-Boot Camp, was announced for the Nintendo Switch, with a planned release date of December 2021. A release date of April 8, 2022 was later announced, however on March 9, 2022, it was announced that due to the Russian invasion of Ukraine the game was being delayed until further notice. Another release date of April 21, 2023 would be announced a year later. These remakes were developed in collaboration with WayForward Technologies.

== Gameplay ==
The player takes the role of a commanding officer (CO) in an army, usually of a country called Red Star (changed to Orange Star following international releases). In Days of Ruin, it is replaced by a nation called Rubinelle (Laurentia in the European release). In the single-player campaign of the Advance Wars games, each level consists of a new map and opposing CO to defeat. Victory is achieved when all the opponent's units have been destroyed, their HQ is captured, or another victory condition has been met. COs take turns recruiting and commanding units on grid-based maps. Units available include infantry, tanks, artillery, bombers, and many other military units. Each turn, each unit may move around and/or perform an action, such as attacking or capturing a property. Certain actions, such as capturing, diving, or loading may only be performed at certain instances throughout the game.

The original Famicom Wars game consists of two armies, Red Star (which became Orange Star in later international versions, possibly to avoid associations with Communism) and Blue Moon fighting over square grid-based maps. The two armies could either be controlled by human players, or a human player could play against an AI opponent. The original Game Boy Wars games featured a system similar to Famicom Wars, except the grid was changed so that the grid squares acted more like hexagons; each square is adjacent to six other squares, instead of four. Game Boy Wars also features a different opposing army called White Moon. Otherwise, the rules remain identical, and only in Game Boy Wars 3 were unit levels and a new resource introduced. Super Famicom Wars, the sequel to Famicom Wars, introduced Yellow Comet and Green Earth, bringing the number of armies playable at once to four. It returned to the basic square grid-based map style of the original game.

The Advance Wars games introduced several new elements. The most notable is that COs now have special abilities called CO Powers that can affect the battle in different ways, giving the CO a temporary advantage over the other COs, such as providing allied units with increased firepower or causing damage to opposing units. Black Hole Rising introduced Super CO Powers, and Dual Strike introduced Tag CO Powers. Conditions such as fog of war, rain, and snow affect the abilities of units to reveal the map and move around. Days of Ruin removed many of the features added to previous Advance Wars games, greatly weakening CO Powers and reintroducing a unit level system.

=== Multiplayer ===
Multiplayer mode is an important part of the Nintendo Wars series. This allows players to compete against friends, each choosing a Commanding Officer to play and country to represent. The Advance Wars series of games, along with the far lesser known Game Boy Wars 3, include map editors, giving them increased replayability. In the original Famicom Wars, two players were allowed to play; in Game Boy Wars, players could play hotseat multiplayer games. Currently the only release to lack hotseat multiplayer is Game Boy Wars Turbo. The Advance Wars series on the Game Boy Advance allowed link-play using link cables. Online multiplayer was originally planned for Dual Strike, but was only later implemented in Days of Ruin. Battalion Wars 2 introduced online multiplayer over the Wii's Wi-Fi connection. The game had 3 modes and 16 maps to play on. The multiplayer section was well-received but was criticized for not supporting voice chat.

== Games ==
Game title	Developer	Publisher	System	Release	Notes
Famicom Wars	Intelligent Systems, Nintendo R&D1	Nintendo	Family Computer	1988	First game in the series. Only released in Japan.
Game Boy Wars	Intelligent Systems, Nintendo R&D1	Nintendo	Game Boy	1991	Only released in Japan.
Game Boy Wars Turbo	Hudson Soft	Hudson Soft	Game Boy	1997	Enhanced version of Game Boy Wars with better AI, more maps, and Super Game Boy support. Only released in Japan.
Super Famicom Wars	Intelligent Systems	Nintendo	Super Famicom Satellaview, Nintendo Power	1998	Only released in Japan.
Game Boy Wars 2	Hudson Soft	Hudson Soft	Game Boy Color	1998	Playable with Game Boy or Game Boy Color. Only released in Japan.
Game Boy Wars 3	Hudson Soft	Hudson Soft	Game Boy Color	2001	Exclusively for Game Boy Color. Only released in Japan. First game of the series to feature a campaign mode.
Advance Wars	Intelligent Systems	Nintendo	Game Boy Advance	2001	Originally only released in North American and PAL regions. In 2004, it was released in Japan as Game Boy Wars Advance 1+2, along with Advance Wars 2: Black Hole Rising.
Advance Wars 2: Black Hole Rising	Intelligent Systems	Nintendo	Game Boy Advance	2003	Released individually in North America and PAL region. Released in Japan only as the compilation Game Boy Wars Advance 1+2, along with Advance Wars.
Advance Wars: Dual Strike	Intelligent Systems	Nintendo	Nintendo DS	2005	
Battalion Wars	Kuju Entertainment	Nintendo	GameCube	2005	Originally titled Advance Wars: Under Fire, but the name was changed for Western audiences as the game was considered a spin-off of the Advance Wars series rather than a direct sequel. Labeled under the Famicom Wars brand in Japan.
Battalion Wars 2	Kuju Entertainment	Nintendo	Wii	2007	
Advance Wars: Days of Ruin (Note: Released as Advance Wars: Dark Conflict in Europe and Oceania.)	Intelligent Systems	Nintendo	Nintendo DS	2008	Originally only released in North American and PAL regions. A Japanese release date was planned but later cancelled. In 2013, it became available in Japan through download on the Nintendo 3DS for any players with a platinum status reward through Club Nintendo.
Advance Wars 1+2: Re-Boot Camp	WayForward	Nintendo	Nintendo Switch	2023	Remake of the original Advance Wars and its sequel, Advance Wars 2: Black Hole Rising.

== Cancelled ==
Game title	Developer	Publisher	System	Release	Notes
64 Wars	Hudson Soft	Hudson Soft	Nintendo 64	1999	Also known as Advance Wars 64 (64ウォーズ). The release was initially announced for January 29, 1999. The game was showcased at Space World 1999 in August, where it was announced that the release date was changed to November, but it was canceled for unknown reasons.
