= Advance Wars: Days of Ruin =

2008 video game

- North American box art
- Developer: Intelligent Systems
- Publisher: Nintendo
- Directors: Daisuke Nakajima; Masaki Tawara
- Producers: Toru Narihiro; Hitoshi Yamagami
- Programmer: Susumu Ishihara
- Artists: Masahiro Higuchi; Hiroaki Hashimoto
- Writer: Kouhei Maeda
- Composer: Yoshito Hirano
- Series: Wars
- Platform: Nintendo DS
- Release: NA: January 21, 2008; EU: January 25, 2008; AU: February 21, 2008; JP: October 30, 2013
- Genre: Turn-based tactics
- Modes: Single-player, multiplayer

Advance Wars: Days of Ruin, released as Advance Wars: Dark Conflict in Europe and Australia, is a turn-based strategy video game developed by Intelligent Systems and published by Nintendo for the Nintendo DS handheld game console. It is the fourth installment in the Advance Wars series after Advance Wars: Dual Strike and was released in 2008 for North America on January 21; in Europe on January 25; and in Australia on February 21. A Japanese release was planned under the title of Famicom Wars DS: Lost Light, (Note: Japanese: ファミコンウォーズDS 失われた光; lit. Famicom Wars DS: Ushinawareta Hikari) but was canceled after a series of delays. It finally became available in Japan through Club Nintendo in October 2013 as a downloadable platinum status reward for the DSiWare service on the Nintendo 3DS family of systems.

Days of Ruin features a grim and more serious tone and atmosphere in contrast to the previous light-hearted installments, with a new storyline, characters and setting independent of the previous games. Set amidst a post-apocalyptic world, the story focuses on the Rubinelle 12th Battalion, (Note: 12th Laurentian Independent Legion in Dark Conflict) one of the surviving remnants of the military of the country of Rubinelle, (Note: Laurentia in Dark Conflict) which had been locked in a century-long war with its rival, Lazuria, (Note: Zephyria in Dark Conflict) prior to a devastating global meteor shower. In the aftermath, the Battalion devotes itself to assisting survivors and restoring order, despite the shattered nations renewing their war against each other and an incurable disease ravaging both sides. Meanwhile, a mysterious faction with unknown motives takes advantage of the destruction and pushes both sides deeper into conflict from behind the scenes.

== Gameplay ==
The primary objective in Days of Ruin is for the player to use their military force to defeat the enemy's force. Except for certain single player missions with special objectives, there are two ways to defeat an opponent: destroy all of the enemy's units or capture their headquarters. The battle system is turn-based; two-to-four forces, each headed by a commanding officer (CO), take turns building and commanding units on grid-based maps. Every turn, units, which consist of ground, sea, and air units, can move across the different types of terrain and attack enemy units or perform other actions, such as submerging a submarine or resupplying friendly units. Many factors can affect the battle, such as fog of war, a phenomenon that prevents players from seeing enemy units other than those in the visual range of their own units; various weather conditions; and CO powers.

Gameplay in Days of Ruin

=== COs and CO powers ===
The entire cast from the previous games has been replaced with new characters. CO powers have been toned down, and no longer affect all units or the whole map. Tag powers from Dual Strike, which allowed players to move twice in one turn, have been removed. Players gain CO powers much later in the campaign than in previous games, and they have a much less significant role in overall gameplay.

At the HQ or any unit-producing property, COs can join with a specific unit, and automatically promote that unit to Vet level, but at the cost of half of that unit's value. The CO's unit confers an advantage on friendly units within a certain range, the "CO zone". These effects are generally minor advantages such as attack or defense boosts. CO effects are constant and, unlike previous games, only benefit units within the CO zone.

As damage is dealt by units within the CO zone, the CO's power meter fills slightly, at a rate of one bar per five hit points worth of damage inflicted. As the CO power meter is filled, the CO zone grows larger. When the meter is full, the CO can activate his or her power which has an effect on the whole battlefield, such as repairing allied units, damaging enemy units, or temporarily altering weather conditions. In addition, the offensive and defensive boosts that normally apply only in the CO zone are applied to all allied units on the whole battlefield for the turn that the CO power is active. If the CO unit is destroyed, the CO meter empties and the CO returns to the HQ, where they can be assigned to another unit.

=== New units, properties, and terrain ===
Units can now level up in battle, increasing their capabilities. Units increase their level once for each enemy unit that they destroy. The level of each unit is identified as "I", "II", or "Vet", with "Vet" being the highest level. While units with higher levels are more powerful than new units, the power increase is slight. Unit experience is not persistent, and the player begins each mission with new units. Not only does the attack increase with each level, but the defense of the unit also increases.

Unit prices have been readjusted and some units renamed, as well as new ones introduced. New land units include the Bike, a highly mobile infantry unit that can capture properties; the Flare, an armored vehicle unit that can reveal areas affected by the Fog of War; the Anti-Tank, an indirect-fire unit strong against tanks with the ability to counter-attack during direct attacks; and the War Tank (formerly the Mega Tank), the strongest ground unit in the game. New air units include the Duster, a weaker, lower-cost interceptor that can strike ground units; and the Seaplane, which is produced by Carriers and can attack any unit, but has limited ammo and fuel reserves. Additionally, there is a single new sea unit, the Gunboat, which is armed with a missile salvo that must be resupplied after each use, and can transport one infantry/mech unit. Also, the Battleship now has the ability to move and fire in the same turn, making it the only indirect-combat unit able to do so.

New properties have also been introduced, including temporary properties which are constructed by the Rig unit (formerly known as the APC). Temporary properties cannot build new units like other properties can, can only be used as stationary resupply bases providing some defensive cover for units, and can be captured by enemy units. Each Rig unit can construct one of two temporary properties, the Temporary Port and Temporary Airport. Additionally, the new Radar property has been added; when captured it clears a five-tile radius of Fog of War.

New terrain is available in the game: Wasteland, which impedes the movement of ground vehicles; Ruins, which provide a minor defense bonus for ground units and hiding places in Fog of War; Fire, which is impassable and illuminates the surrounding area during Fog of War; Rough Sea, which impedes the movement of naval units; Mist, which provides a defense bonus and hiding place for naval units; and Meteors and Plasma. Plasma forms an impassable wall that no unit can cross, and is generated by Meteors. Once a Meteor is destroyed, any Plasma in contact with it disappears, allowing units to pass. Plasma that is not in contact with a meteor cannot be destroyed.

=== Campaign ===
The campaign plays out through 26 missions, with story scenes that tie the plot together occurring between and during the battles. In addition, 38 training missions are unlocked as the missions are completed. The training missions are more challenging, entirely optional, and can be played separately from the campaign. One new feature in Days of Ruin is that campaign missions can now be played individually as the player completes them. Like the training missions, campaign missions can be selected from the main menu at any time.

Upon completing a mission, the player is awarded a rank, starting with the lowest at C and going to B, A, and S, which is the highest. The ranks are based on three categories: Power, Technique, and Speed, each determined by meeting certain conditions in a battle. All three categories are rated on a scale from 0–150, and added together to form a numerical ranking from 0–450 in addition to their letter ranking; for example, any score between 300 and 450 earns an S ranking. Unlike previous games, the numerical score is not converted into points that can be redeemed to purchase new maps and COs; instead, COs are unlocked after the completion of certain missions and all maps (with the exception of training missions) are available at the beginning of gameplay.

In a departure from the previous games, which included five factions in the campaign, Days of Ruin features only four: the Rubinelle 12th Battalion (Red), Lazurian Army (Blue), New Rubinelle Army (Yellow), and Intelligent Defense Systems (Black), although The Beast (also Black and also allied with IDS) could be considered a separate faction. These factions have different names in the American, European, and Japanese versions of the game.

=== Multiplayer ===
In a first for the series, Days of Ruin includes online multiplayer via the Nintendo Wi-Fi Connection service, as well as a feature for players to share their own custom map designs and download maps made by others (creating and sharing custom maps is a feature present in every Advance Wars game). Over 150 premade maps are included in the game for use in local multiplayer, and designed for two, three, and four-player matches. Multiplayer games can be played with only one DS game card via a hot-seat mechanic; each player can pass the game to the next player when it is their turn. It is also possible to set all sides to CPU, which is useful for studying the AI.

==== Custom maps ====
When players create and upload their own custom maps to the Wi-Fi Connection, these maps can be tested and given approval ratings by other players from around the world. Players can download randomly selected maps from the Nintendo Wi-Fi Connection, or they can choose maps based on their approval ratings. In order to upload a map, the player must win it once, and rate it based on its difficulty. The maximum size for uploadable maps is 10x10 tiles, and the player can only upload one at a time; if the player uploads another map, then the original one is replaced. Maps can have any dimensions between 30x30 and 5x5 tiles, and the game is able to store up to 50 custom maps.

=== Online multiplayer ===
When using Nintendo Wi-Fi Connection for online multiplayer, the player can choose between a match with a random opponent from around the world, or a match with someone that the player has exchanged friend codes with. Worldwide matches are limited to two players, with the weather conditions being randomly generated and a map randomly chosen from a set list. Worldwide match players can choose if they want an opponent close to their skill level or to play against an opponent regardless of skill level. When playing with a friend, more options are opened up to allow greater customization of the match, such as the type of weather and the duration of the match. Voice chat is only supported when playing with a friend, and is unavailable during worldwide online play.

==== Local multiplayer ====
Players also have the option of using local multiplayer, which requires that each player have a separate DS game card and increases the limit of those who can participate to between 2-4 players. 28 classic maps from previous Advance Wars games, 70 two-player maps, 32 three-player maps, and 30 four-player maps are all playable with local multiplayer. Custom maps can also be used in multiplayer. The conditions of these maps can be customized by the players. Also, like in previous games, there is an option to use one DS system and game card to play with up to four players. Via a hot-seat system, the player plays their turn and then passes the DS to the next player in order.

== Plot ==
The story of Days of Ruin is unconnected to the stories of previous games. Almost 90% of humanity has been killed off following devastating meteor strikes which have destroyed much of civilization and caused a massive dust cloud to blot out the sun, preventing photosynthesis and thereby preventing the growing of crops. Scattered survivors pick through the wreckage, and the remnants of several military superpowers patrol the ravaged landscape, some factions protecting the innocent while the others prey upon them.

Following the disaster, which obliterated much of the warring nations of Rubinelle and Lazuria, a young cadet from the Rubinelle military academy named Will (Note: Ed in Dark Conflict) escapes the ruins of the academy and is confronted by The Beast, (Note: Drakov in Dark Conflict) a former sergeant gone rogue who leads a band of raiders. Will is rescued by Brenner (Note: O'Brian in Dark Conflict) and Lin of Rubinelle's 12th Battalion (nicknamed "Brenner's Wolves"), and takes on the group's cause of finding and rescuing survivors of the meteor strikes. During a search, Will discovers a mysterious amnesiac who does not remember her own name, but somehow knows detailed military information. Will later names her Isabella, (Note: Catleia in Dark Conflict) and she becomes a vital part of the battalion as they put an end to The Beast's reign of terror and take refuge inside of an abandoned but operational emergency shelter.

One year after the meteor strikes, the 12th Battalion comes into contact with the New Rubinelle Army, (Note: New Laurentian Army in Dark Conflict) and learns of the war raging between the Lazurian Army and the NRA. Brenner reluctantly sides with Admiral Greyfield, (Note: Sigismundo in Dark Conflict) leader of the NRA, and advances on the Lazurian force, eventually defeating them at Fort Lazuria. Distraught by the ruthless execution of the Lazurian commander, Forsythe, (Note: Carter in Dark Conflict) Brenner and the 12th Battalion break the Lazurian prisoners out of an NRA internment camp before they can be executed. While the group escapes, Brenner stays behind and hides in an abandoned city to buy them time. An infuriated Greyfield orders the use of a new weapon which completely destroys the city, killing Brenner and the NRA troops searching for him. Lin later leads a force against Greyfield and personally kills Greyfield, avenging Brenner's death and defeating the NRA once and for all.

The 12th Battalion is unexpectedly attacked soon after by Intelligent Defense Systems, a private military contractor that had secretly supported the Lazurians and the NRA by supplying them with weapons of mass destruction. Dr. Caulder (Note: Stolos in Dark Conflict), scientist and leader of IDS, had taken advantage of the world's devastation to carry out inhumane biological and psychological experiments, such as the spread of a fatal, artificially-grown virus known as The Creeper, (Note: Floral Virus in Dark Conflict), and the creation of clones for use as research subjects for said experiments, one of whom was Isabella before she escaped from him. Caulder's goal was to study subject reaction and the results of the before-untested weaponry in the now-lawless world. Despite numerous demoralizing attacks by IDS, the battalion survives and eventually pursues Caulder to his main laboratory and fortress. In the end, Caulder is killed in the destruction of his lab, and the war is finally brought to an end. One year later, the village of New Hope, founded by the 12th Battalion after the conflict, begins to flourish in the new-found peace. The sun is seen rising above the nearby hills for the first time since the meteor strikes, giving hope of a brighter future.

== Development ==
Days of Ruin was announced as Advance Wars DS 2 during the 2007 E3 Media and Business Summit. No other details for this installment were given other than the tentative name, but two months later in October a playable demo version was showcased at the Micromania Games Show in Paris, France, where the new darker style was first revealed. The game's title was officially released as Advance Wars: Days of Ruin for the North American version, with a planned shipping date of January 21, 2008; the alternate name of Advance Wars: Dark Conflict for European and Australian versions was released in early December.

Advance Wars: Days of Ruin features a different art style and tone than previous entries in the series. When asked why it was changed, the developers stated that they wanted to surprise people. One of the game's English localizers, Tim O'Leary, commented that the design change also came from reading comments from people stating to the effect of, "We like the game, we love the game, but it's the same thing". In creating the new art style, setting, and plot, the developers discovered that Japanese people have a different view on war than Westerners, citing the previous titles' lighthearted take on the subject. As a result, they designed the game to be grittier and more somber to cater to Western audiences. Another major influence on the new direction was sales data; Advance Wars was more successful in North America than in Japan.

The developers discussed the kinds of people that would exist in this world - people who seek out others to help them; people who attempt to further their own agendas by taking control of pieces of land; and those who attempt to hoard supplies and kill anyone who gets in their way. They added that they also wanted to make an Advance Wars title that even veterans of the series would find fresh. The setting was also a reason for the design change, being a "not-so-distant future science fiction" setting, which the developers felt didn't fit well with the style of previous titles. When asked whether they feared that gamers would be turned off by the changes, the developers responded by saying that they have to "fight against" this fear. The developers felt that without innovation, the series would turn players off, so they introduced new gameplay mechanics as well as the new setting.

In discussing the more lighthearted elements of the plot, such as Dr. Morris, a character who tells corny jokes, the developers commented that these elements accentuated the dark elements of the game rather than detracted from them, as well as showing the stability of the survivors' mental conditions. The decision to include more dialogue than previous entries in the series was to ensure that this new world and the new characters were understandable by the player, though the developers acknowledge that it could also distract from the strategic gameplay. The developers felt that the dialogue made the story more enjoyable for the players, as opposed to being a vehicle to move the gameplay forward. When asked if Days of Ruin was an attempt to bridge this series with fellow Intelligent Systems series Fire Emblem, developers commented that while the increase in volume may make it seem like that was the case, it was not their intention. They explained that while Fire Emblem placed importance on individual units, Advance Wars was about improving as a Commanding Officer.

The developers intended to require the players to employ more tactical approaches to maps, in their introduction of such units as the Flare Gun, a vehicle that could reveal parts of the map hidden by fog of war, and the commanding officers, who have had their "CO Powers" reduced in importance from the previous titles. However, the developers added that one does not have to be a "master strategist" to play the game, commenting that the Flare Gun could be used by casual players to quickly move across a map covered in fog of war, while more advanced players may use it for more strategic means. This unit was added as a means to speed up stages with fog of war. Other new units include the Bike, which was a means of achieving a faster tempo to the game. When asked why the Duster, a modified crop duster, was added in favor of the stealth jet from the game's predecessor Advance Wars: Dual Strike, the developers commented that the Duster was an inexpensive aerial unit that was not only easy to use, but could attack ground units as well. The unit was also added to be a throwback to an older era, as well as demonstrating how people in this world use anything they can as a means of survival.

Other additions include the Rig and the Anti-Tank; the Rig is a modified version of an APC from the previous titles modified to be able to build temporary buildings, while the Anti-Tank is both a direct and long-range weapon specifically designed to do damage to tanks. Two modifications include the Battleship, which can now move and attack in one round, and the Aircraft Carrier, which can produce low-fuel aircraft called Seaplanes. Another new unit is the Gunship, which can attack and carry units as well. In discussing the newly introduced online play, the developers felt that it was necessary to limit online battles to only two people per battle, explaining that they felt it would be too boring for a player to have to sit and stare at a screen while three other people made their moves.

When asked why the mechanism of unlocking maps and characters - accomplished in previous titles by purchasing them with points or coins won through battle - was removed, the developers apologized, commenting that after long deliberation, they felt that such a mechanic was detrimental to the enjoyment of gamers who are too busy to take the time to unlock all of these things. As a result, they designed this game in a way that allowed players to play any non-story based map they wanted, introducing other mechanics to encourage players to keep playing. The developers commented that Days of Ruin had more strategy than previous entries in the series due to the changes and removals made to the established formula compared to the other titles.

Another interviewer further inquired about the removal of series staple features, including dual-screen play, leveling up Commanding Officers, Survival Mode, Combat Mode, and Hard Mode. The dual-screen play was removed, with the developers commenting that while it could have been implemented, it did not need to be, and the full use of the dual screens for viewing intel on units and terrain allowed the gameplay to proceed more seamlessly. The ability to level up players' COs was introduced in Dual Strike, the developers commenting that the gameplay centered around how well players utilized their Commanding Officer. This mechanic was replaced by the ability to level up individual units, commenting that this mechanic required players to work strategically with how they deploy their units. The Survival and Combat Modes were removed due to not fitting with the redesign of the world, preferring to have a more focused game. Finally, Hard Mode was removed due to the developers feeling that the Normal Mode was designed in such a way that a widespread audience could enjoy it. They also commented that earning a high ranking in this mode by doing a good job was effectively the same as Hard mode.

=== Regional differences ===
The European and Australian release, Dark Conflict, is identical to the North American release, Days of Ruin, in terms of the storyline, gameplay, and features. Several minor details distinguish each version, such as differences in the names of the factions, characters, chapter names and units, as well as significant dialogue changes. This is due to Nintendo of America and Nintendo of Europe receiving Japanese copies of the game to translate independently, resulting in unique versions for each region.

== Reception ==
Reception

Aggregate scores
Aggregator	Score
GameRankings	85.37%
Metacritic	86/100

Review scores
Publication	Score
1Up.com	A−
Eurogamer	8/10
Game Informer	8.75/10
GamePro	4.5/5
GameSpot	8/10
IGN	8.6/10
Nintendo Power	8.5/10

Advance Wars: Days of Ruin has received generally positive reviews, having aggregate scores of 85 and 86 on GameRankings and Metacritic, respectively. Nintendo Power gave a positive rating, calling the game "comfortingly familiar" with battles that are "more approachable than before". Online multiplayer was noted as taking "wireless connectivity and Nintendo Wi-Fi Connection further than any game that has preceded it". One of the main flaws of Days of Ruin was identified as a lack of gameplay innovation. Game Informer's Adam Biessener called it "an excellent game", but criticized its change from "charming, cartoony roots" to a "dreary post-apocalyptic setting".

1UP.com praised the new turn Days of Ruin has taken for the series, but noted that the storyline, while darker than before, was still close in tone to the humor of the previous games. The new CO deployment feature was called the biggest change to the gameplay. The game was criticized for the removal of several staple features of the series, but complimented the new online play feature as being "the most balanced Advance Wars experience". IGN gave the game a high rating for taking risks with its artistic design, but also criticized the loss of old single-player modes in favor of new multiplayer content. IGN named Advance Wars: Days of Ruin the Best Online Multiplayer Game of 2008 for the Nintendo DS. The game was also a nominee for other awards from IGN, including Best Strategy Game and Best Artistic Design. GameSpot's Ryan Davis praised the game for its online support, the map editor, and sharper visuals, but criticized it for its difficult campaign mode and felt that the story wasn't strong enough to support the darker tone of the game.

During the 12th Annual Interactive Achievement Awards, the Academy of Interactive Arts & Sciences nominated Days of Ruin for "Hand-Held Game of the Year" and "Strategy/Simulation Game of the Year".

In North America, Days of Ruin sold over 81,000 copies in January after its release, and close to 50,300 copies in February, bringing total sales in the region to over 130,000 as of March 2008.

In 2009, Official Nintendo Magazine wrote that "few games are capable of so completely ensnaring the player - its chess-like gameplay at once ridiculously sophisticated while still being extremely accessible", ranking the game 19th on a list of the greatest Nintendo games.
