= Battalion Wars 2 =

2007 video game

- Developer: Kuju London
- Publisher: Nintendo
- Director: Tancred Dyke-Wells
- Producers: Jonathan Eardley; Antonia Cullum; Brynley Gibson
- Designer: Andrew Trowers
- Programmer: Richard Smith
- Artists: Adonis Stevenson; Cumron Ashtiani
- Writer: Paul Mackman
- Series: Wars
- Platform: Wii
- Release: NA: 29 October 2007; EU: 15 February 2008; AU: 20 March 2008; JP: 15 May 2008
- Genres: Action, real-time tactics
- Modes: Single-player, multiplayer

Battalion Wars 2, released as Assault!! Famicom Wars VS (Note: Japanese: 突撃!!ファミコンウォーズVS, Hepburn: Totsugeki!! Famikon Wōzu VS) in Japan, is a 2007 real-time tactics game developed by Kuju London and published by Nintendo for the Wii. It is the sequel to Battalion Wars (2005), in which players take command of a battalion of troops to complete missions and defeat opposing forces in battle. The game amended some existing gameplay from the previous title, while introducing new elements, including multiplayer modes, naval units, and base structures. The game's single-player story focuses on a new conflict emerging following the previous war that is being used to mask the search for a powerful ancient superweapon, with players taking charge of troops across three campaigns in the present, and two set at different points in the past.

The game received generally favorable reviews, though with some criticism levied on various areas including the game's controls. The game's online multiplayer modes became unavailable for use, as a result of Nintendo Wi-Fi Connection shutting down on 20 May 2014.

== Gameplay ==
Like its predecessor, the game is played from a third-person perspective, in which players take control of a variety of units that form a battalion, in order to complete missions and battles. Gameplay features a mixture of elements from both third-person shooters and real-time tactics games, with players taking control of a single unit fully, while giving orders to the rest of their battalion, whether to a single unit, a company of the same type, or the entire battalion. Battalion Wars 2 amended some elements of gameplay brought over from its predecessor - Light and Heavy recon units were replaced with the Recon unit, combining the speed of the former with the firepower of the latter; the HUD's radar now features a mini-map of the battlefield; and units can now be given orders by players through the map screen. One significant change was allowing players to take control of five of the six playable factions during the single-player mode, consisting of twenty missions plus a prologue, with each faction receiving their own campaign that is unlocked one after the other.

Along with making improvements to existing gameplay, Battalion Wars 2 added in new elements for players - Naval Units, and Base Facilities. Naval units are based upon those from the Advance Wars series, with the addition of the Dreadnought that is exclusive to the Battalion Wars series, all of which the player can control and give orders to, with the exception of Naval Transports - like Air Transports, they cannot be controlled or given orders. Base Facilities consist of Headquarters, Barracks, Factories, Air Bases, and Docks, and act as respawn points for units lost in battle - HQs respawn Rifle Grunts; Barracks respawn infantry units; Factories respawn ground vehicles; Air Bases respawn aircraft; and Docks respawn Naval Units - so long as they are under the player's control. Each facility features a capture point, based on the system from the previous game, which only infantry can take, and once captured, the building is rebuilt in the architectural style of the player's faction (i.e. if controlled by the Solar Empire, the facility sports a high-tech look).

One of the biggest improvements made by Battalion Wars 2 was the inclusion of multiplayer modes, a feature absent in the previous game. Multiplayer offered three online modes for two players to take part in, via Nintendo's Wi-Fi Connection - Skirmish, Assault, and Co-operative. In Skirmish, players could start out with a pre-deployed force, and win by earning as many points as possible from destroying enemy units within a specified time limit, with Facilities available that could be used to respawn units as long as they remained in a player's control. In Assault mode, one player could command a siege battalion and win by destroying the opposing player's assets, with the latter winning by defending against this. In Co-operative mode, both players could tackle a battalion controlled by an AI opponent, in which each player was assigned a certain role(s) (i.e. anti-air), forcing each to rely on the other to counter units they couldn't deal with.

== Plot ==
=== Prologue ===
200 years ago, the Iron Legion, ruled by the fearsome Lord Ferrok, was on the brink of total conquest of the world. Ferrok, believing victory was at hand, gathered his armies at his stronghold, the Iron Tower, to prepare for a final onslaught. However, the Solar Empire, the last nation still standing after the Lightning Wars, invades Old Xylvania in a last-ditch attempt to destroy the Legion. After a series of battles, Empress Qa-Len, monarch of the Solar Empire, drops a strike battalion equipped with a powerful staff deep into Legion territory with orders to take it to the top of the Iron Tower, whereby it can be used to activate a satellite super-weapon, which would destroy the Legion. Lord Ferrok, discovering the plan, sends in bombers to find and eliminate them, yet one member of the battalion survives the assault. A lone grunt finds the staff just as it is about to fall into enemy hands, and quickly proceeds towards the tower. His rifle is now supercharged by the staff, and a shield is created around himself. The Staff Bearer (as he became known) defeats many Legion troops, heavy tanks and gunships before destroying one of Ferrok's precious Battlestations. The explosion from the Battlestation destroys the protective wall around the tower, clearing the path for the Staff Bearer (who is now accompanied by three Solar grunts). After defeating the grunts guarding the tower, the four Solar warriors infiltrate the tower and activate the satellite's superweapon. A huge blast from the satellite destroys both the Iron Tower and the Iron Legion. Qa-Len finds the staff in the blast crater, and proceeds to an icy wasteland, where she throws it into a chasm, in hopes that it may never be used again, unaware this action would spark a new conflict in the future.

=== Solar Empire Campaign ===
Following the conflict with Xylvania, Western Frontier commanders enjoy a vacation on the islands of the Solar Empire, only for it to be abruptly ended. Colonel Windsor and Commander Pierce, of the Anglo Isles, launch a preemptive strike on the Solar Empire, believing rumours that they are constructing a superweapon. An invasion force, including a squadron of fighters and bombers led by Commander Pierce and a battleship fleet led by Colonel Windsor, attack the Western Frontier Naval base situated on one of the Solar Islands. At the Imperial Palace, Admiral A-Qira interrupts Empress Lei-Qo to inform her of the Anglo attacks, but the Empress already knows and says that "history has come full circle, just as she had foreseen", leaving her Admiral to deal with the attack. Aided by the Frontier, the Empire counter-attacks the Anglo forces, and after a series of losing battles, the Anglo Isles finally withdraw their troops and return to their home country. They soon realize that the Solar Empire has no superweapon, since their attack did not prompt the use of such a device, but Admiral A-Qira, saying that "honor demands that we launch a subsequent attack immediately", prepares for a counterstrike (even though Empress Lei-Qo forbids it), calling on Marshall Nova and the Tundra Territories to assist him, with Nova agreeing to do so, after visited upon by the ghost of his father, Tsar Gorgi.

=== Western Frontier Campaign ===
After returning to their nation following the conflict in the Solar Empire, General Herman takes Brigadier Betty into the Western Frontier War Room, suspecting the recent skirmishes have a familiar sense of deja vu to it, and looks for files detailing past events in the world. When he finds what he is looking for, Herman tells Betty about the Frontier's early hostilities with the Tundran Territories, back when Gorgi was still in charge of the Tundran Territories. Back then, Gorgi had his nation invade the Frontier on the belief that they were creating a super-weapon, in the same manner that occurred in the present day. This forced a younger Herman to rally the Frontier into first defending against the assault before repelling the invasion, eventually ending the conflict with the Frontier winning, and having both sides make a peace treaty. While explaining his story to Betty, Herman mentions that he and the Frontier's troops saw Xylvanian troops within their territory, but he never found out the reason why they were there or what they were up to. By the time he finishes his story, Herman voices concern, believing he has a suspicion on who might have orchestrated the attack between the Anglo Isles and the Solar Empire.

=== Anglo Isles Campaign ===
A few days after the conflict in his homeland, A-Qira, having reorganized his forces, leads the Solar Empire into battle, and along with aid from the Tundran Territories, launches a counter-invasion against the Anglo Isles. Colonel Windsor and Commander Pierce find themselves forced to take on the might of the two nations, and defend several key points as a result. Although initially doing well, A-Qira is eventually pushed out of the Anglo Isles, as Windsor and Pierce successfully repel the invasion. As Anglo bombers attack the Solar Empire's naval fleet, A-Qira, witnessing this, drinks from a canteen of his, upset that he is losing the war. A few seconds later, he suddenly finds himself being confronted by Kaiser Vlad, the fugitive Xylvanian leader who escaped from the Alliance of Nations in the previous war. A-Qira suddenly realizes that Kaiser Vlad has tricked both nations into starting the war against each other, but begins coughing soon after while turning pale, realizing that Vlad has poisoned his drink. A-Qira dies shortly afterwards, while Vlad contacts his troops to see how their invasion of the defenceless Tundran Territories is coming along.

=== Iron Legion Campaign ===
While Xylvanian and Tundra forces engage each other in the northern regions of the Tundra Territories, Vlad frees Ubel from his gulag by gassing the two grunts guarding him. Vlad then proceeds to tell Ubel that he has discovered the key to their vengeance upon their enemies, thanks to the Iron Legion's defeat. He explains to Ubel about the many battles which took place in Old Xylvania during the final days of the Lightning Wars, when the Solar Empire made a final attempt to annihilate the Iron Legion before they took control of the world, and reveals that his aim to ignite the conflict between the Anglo Isle and Solar Empire was to divert forces away from the region he needed to reach, having now found the staff that can activate the Empire's superweapon.

=== Tundran Territories Campaign ===
Having found the Staff of Qa-Len, Kaiser Vlad finally proclaims to destroy his enemies, alerting the other nations to the threat posed on them. Nova, learning of the invasion of his homeland, launches an assault on the Xylvian forces, aided by the other nations, as he and the other COs fight to reach the icy chasm in the northern region of the Tundran Territories, in an attempt to repel Vlad's expedition for the staff. The Alliance of Nations fights its way through Tundra and destroys Vlad's Mining Spider, a gigantic vehicle that he is using to dig up the staff. Vlad and Ubel manage to escape from the spider as it is being destroyed, just as Vlad finds the Staff of Qa-Len and uses it at the last possible second. The super-weapon causes massive destruction in the surrounding area, yet despite this, all the Alliance of Nations' CO's narrowly escape with their lives, while Vlad and Ubel are trapped in the ice, forced to dig their way out. With the nations successful, a parade in the Tundran Territories capital is held, honouring the effort put to ending the recent conflict.

== Reception ==
Reception

Aggregate score
| Aggregator | Score |
|---|---|
| Metacritic | 75/100 |

Review scores
| Publication | Score |
|---|---|
| Edge | 5/10 |
| Eurogamer | 7/10 |
| Famitsu | 28/40 |
| Game Informer | 7.25/10 |
| GamePro | 3.75/5 |
| GameSpot | 7.5/10 |
| GameSpy | 4/5 |
| GameTrailers | 7.7/10 |
| IGN | 8/10 |
| Nintendo Power | 7.5/10 |

Battalion Wars 2 received "generally favorable reviews" according to the review aggregation website Metacritic. IGN cited an impressive story mode, addition of naval units, mostly intuitive controls, and fun online modes. Sticking points included that Kuju failed to capitalize on or misused Wii's control enhancements, the inability to play through the single-player campaign in online cooperative mode, and the lack of voice chat. Official Nintendo Magazine criticised the lack of a "retreat" command and the occasionally fiddly controls, but commended the graphics and strong online mode. Hyper's Dylan Burns commended the game for its "heaps of units and high production values", but criticised it for its "iffy motion control and being a bit too cutesy". In Japan, Famitsu gave it a score of one seven, one eight, one seven, and one six for a total of 28 out of 40.
