= Advance Wars =

2001 turn-based Nintendo video game

- North American box art
- Developer: Intelligent Systems
- Publisher: Nintendo
- Director: Toru Narihiro
- Producer: Takehiro Izushi
- Programmer: Takanori Hino
- Artist: Ryo Hirata
- Writer: Masayuki Horikawa
- Composer: Taishi Senda
- Series: Wars
- Platform: Game Boy Advance
- Release: NA: September 10, 2001; AU: 2001; EU: January 11, 2002; JP: November 25, 2004 (as part of Game Boy Wars Advance 1+2)
- Genre: Turn-based strategy
- Modes: Single-player, multiplayer

Advance Wars (Note: Known in Japan as Game Boy Wars Advance (Japanese: ゲームボーイウォーズアドバンス, Hepburn: Gēmu Bōi Wōzu Adobansu)) is a turn-based strategy video game developed by Intelligent Systems and published by Nintendo for the Game Boy Advance. It is the seventh title in the Wars series of video games, and the first in the Advance Wars sub-series. The game takes place on a fictional continent, where two nations, Orange Star and Blue Moon, have been fighting each other for years. The conflict enters a new stage when an Orange Star commanding officer named Andy is accused of attacking the armies of two other nations, Yellow Comet and Green Earth, without reason, resulting in a worldwide war.

As with previous Wars titles, Advance Wars was not originally intended for release outside Japan, due to Nintendo feeling that Western consumers would not be interested in turn-based games because of their complex mechanics. In order to alleviate this, the developers made the mechanics easy to understand, adding in an in-depth tutorial that did not require players to read the manual. Designer Kentaro Nishimura commented that the game's success shifted Nintendo's attitude over Western tastes, and that same success is frequently credited as a driving force for Nintendo bringing another Intelligent Systems franchise, Fire Emblem, outside of Japan beginning with the seventh installment.

Advance Wars was released in North America on September 10, 2001. Its release in Japan and Europe was delayed due to the release date in connections with the September 11 attacks in the United States. Although eventually released in Europe in January 2002, it would not be released in Japan until the Game Boy Wars Advance 1+2 compilation in 2004 alongside its sequel Advance Wars 2: Black Hole Rising, whose original Japanese release was cancelled. The game received critical acclaim from critics and has been declared as one of the greatest video games ever made. Advance Wars has been re-released for the Wii U Virtual Console simultaneously in Europe and North America on April 3, 2014. On April 21, 2023, the title was remade for the Nintendo Switch alongside its sequel Black Hole Rising in a compilation developed by WayForward titled Advance Wars 1+2: Re-Boot Camp, which was announced by Nintendo at E3 2021. It was released in America and Europe, but not Japan.

== Gameplay ==
The objective in each mission is to defeat the enemy army. There are two ways to defeat an opponent: destroy every one of the opponent's units on the map, known as routing the enemy, or capture the opponent's headquarters. However, some maps have specific objectives, such as capturing a certain number of cities to claim victory or survive a set number of days. The available modes of play include "Field Training" which offers tutorial missions, a campaign mode which carries the game's storyline, the "War Room" which is a collection of maps on which the player strives for high scores, as well as multiplayer modes and a map design mode. The "Campaign" and "War Room" modes both help to rank the player up (from Rank #100 to Rank #1) and to earn coins to unlock COs and maps in the "Battle Maps" shop. The modes also gives the player an additional rank for effort after winning a battle on that map, which assesses the player's speed, power, and technique in that battle; speed being the number of days spent trying to win the battle, power being how many enemy units were defeated, and technique is the number of the player's units that survived (in percentage).

=== Battle system ===
The battles of Advance Wars are turn-based. Two to four armies, each headed by a CO (commanding officer), take turns building and commanding units on grid-based maps, while attacking enemy units, moving positions, holding ground, or capturing enemy/neutral properties (cities, ports, airports, bases, or HQ).

Screenshot

All units are limited in the types of units they can attack. What dictates a unit's ability to attack different targets are its primary and secondary weapons. For example, the Mech unit has a bazooka that can only be fired at land vehicles, but are more powerful for that purpose than their secondary weapons, machine guns, which Mechs can use against other Mechs, infantry, and helicopters.

Units that can attack do so either directly (can attack adjacent to another unit where standing or moved, but will be counter-attacked by the enemy unit), or indirectly (must remain still to attack, and have an enemy in firing range). The amount of damage done by a unit to an enemy unit in combat comes down to a number of factors: the number of hit points the attacker has, whether they can fire their main weapon (if not, they either cannot attack or will use their secondary weapon instead), the type of unit the attacker and the defender are, and the terrain the enemy unit is on; by contrast, if the enemy unit is directly attacked, the same factors determine the damage done when they counter-attack the attacking unit. The majority of units have main weapons with a limited supply of ammunition, with the amount of ammo depending on the type of unit. Units with secondary weapons will resort to these when their primary weapon's ammunition runs out until they are resupplied.

=== Terrain ===
The terrain on a map affects unit movement, vision, and the defense attribute of units stationed in the terrain. The different types of terrain include: roads, plains, woods, bases, HQs (Headquarters), ports, cities, airports, the sea, reefs, shoals, rivers, and mountains. All units are affected by terrain, except air units, which gain neither an advantage or a disadvantage as a result. Weather conditions, when active, can affect the vision and movement of ground units, while fog of war, when active, can reduce a player's vision, making them depend on individual units' lines of sight, which varies from unit to unit; infantry can expand the vision when in mountains, while woods and reefs cannot be seen into unless a unit is adjacent (next) to it.

=== Units ===
There are 18 different types of military units in Advance Wars. Each unit has a set amount of attack power, vision range in fog of war, movement range and type, and fuel supply. Some units are equipped with two weapons, which can be used against different types of enemy units. There are both direct and indirect attack units, as well as unarmed transport units. All the units are either infantry, vehicles, ships, or air units. Units have specific strengths and weaknesses. One rule of thumb that units have to adhere to is that a portion of their fuel supply is used up each turn; ground units who run out cannot move, while air and naval units who run out are destroyed as they consume fuel even when stationary. Submarines consume more fuel than usual when submerged.

=== Multiplayer ===
In Multiplayer mode, players can compete against the AI or against other human players. Multiplayer matches feature a variety of settings that can be changed pre-battle. Multiplayer comes in two forms: Versus mode and Link mode. In Versus mode, only one GBA system is used, which every participant in the game uses. One player will take their turn, then pass the system to the next. Link mode is the same game as Versus mode gameplay-wise, but multiple consoles are used, one for each person. It can be played with just one game pak or with one game pak per player.

=== Commanding officers ===
Armies are led by COs, who control units. Most COs provide units with innate special advantages and disadvantages, such as extra firepower, greater strength, or a shorter firing range, with some COs being better with specific units (e.g. being better with air units than naval units). COs also have a Power Meter which fills up by defeating enemy units or when on the receiving end of a brutal offensive attack. When the meter is full, a CO can unleash their "CO Power", which gives a temporary positive effect to friendly units and/or a negative effect to enemy units. For example, Nell gives a Critical Strike bonus to her units and Olaf makes it snow, limiting the movement range of his opponent.

== Plot ==
The story of the Advance Wars begins in the "Field Training" tutorial mode, with the nation of Orange Star in a war against the neighboring nation of Blue Moon, with Olaf as the Blue Moon Army commanding officer (CO). Olaf suddenly ordered an invasion of the Orange Star nation and is in battle with the Orange Star Army. The campaign continues the story that started in the tutorial. Nell, the de facto leader of the Orange Star COs, gives the player the duty of a tactical advisor for the Orange Star Army.

The player follows the war effort through all four countries, with its own COs, over the course of the game. Starting with having only one choice of a CO to advise, Andy, the player will have a choice of two more Orange Star COs, Max and Sami, to advise as the story progresses, each with their own advantages and disadvantages. Depending on which CO is chosen by the player to advise, there are times when a mission is split into a choice of two or three, where the maps and dialog could be different. After completing that mission, the story paths could split up, depending on which CO was chosen in that previous mission, with the story differing from the other path, eventually leading back to the main path.

After winning a battle against Green Earth, Andy gets mysteriously accused by Green Earth's CO, Eagle, of committing a treacherous act of aggression against Green Earth. After defeating the Blue Moon troops that invaded the Orange Star country, the Orange Star Army then invade the Blue Moon country, defeating their troops. The Blue Moon COs, Olaf and Grit, are revealed to be COs who both used to work for the Orange Star Army, but switched to Blue Moon. When the Orange Star Army's intention was to just pass through the other two countries, Green Earth and Yellow Comet, the countries' COs like Kanbei of Yellow Comet assume a threat of an invasion and declare battles against the Orange Star Army in their land.

Later on, Green Earth CO Drake tells Eagle that the Orange Star Army did not attack Green Earth, saying that "This entire conflict has been orchestrated from the beginning". Meanwhile, Yellow Comet CO Sonja and Grit try to discover the person who is really behind the attacks. When Eagle meets Andy again, Eagle again accuses Andy of attacking Green Earth, to which the Orange Star COs eventually convince Eagle that it was not Andy who attacked Green Earth. This explains why the three nations have been declaring battles against Orange Star, as they thought Andy attacked them first.

When Eagle meets Sonja, Sonja also tells Eagle that Andy was not behind the attacks, saying it was someone else, and goes with her to see what she discovered. It is revealed that the enigmatic Black Hole Army, under the command of Sturm, is the true enemy. Using a CO doppelganger clone of Andy, Sturm stirred up war among the four countries in order to confuse, weaken, and eventually conquer them. Once this is revealed, the four countries unite to drive Black Hole out of their land, the Cosmo Land, with COs automatically chosen depending on the paths the player took during the game.

== Development ==
Advance Wars was first announced at Nintendo Space World 2000 under the name Game Boy Wars Advance. In January 2001, Nintendo France gave new screenshots from this and other Game Boy Advance games to French gaming sites with little other information. It was developed by Intelligent Systems, and eventually published by Nintendo. Four player mode was confirmed before E3 2001 and with it a US release date of September 10. Game Boy Wars Advance was originally scheduled for an October 12, 2001 release in Japan, but it was canceled in order to avoid competition with Game Boy Wars 3 (released for the Game Boy Color that same year). It was eventually released in a two-in-one compilation in 2004 with its sequel, Game Boy Wars Advance 2.

Development of Advance Wars began alongside the Game Boy Advance launch titles, but because Nintendo was so busy with them, they requested that Intelligent Systems assist in the development. Director Makoto Shimojo commented that the early stages of development often feature Intelligent Systems coming up with unique game mechanics for it, and upon presenting to Nintendo, typically being told that it was "too sophisticated" or "not balanced for a general audience". At which point, they began working on adjustments. The game was designed with the Game Boy Advance's young children audience, giving the game a "pop design", with bright colors, rounded characters, and comedy. Shimojo commented that in spite of this, the majority of purchasers were teenage boys. In order to cope with bringing a strategy game to a handheld with a younger audience, Shimojo and his team made the game feature "waves of excitement"; he compared this to how long films will introduce calm periods in order to have good pacing.

Shimojo discussed how various developers introduced elements from their favorite genres into the game. He gave examples which included a developer who was a fan of shooters designing the movement system to work in a way that allows players to control their units "down to the perfect centimeter", as well as a developer who was a fan of rhythm games adding a rhythm to how the units move. Intelligent Systems also attempted to cater to those who had a more serious interest in the weapons and the costume designs. As a result, they followed real history in developing these aspects, though making deformed versions of these weapons rather than duplications. The story and setting of the game were designed to not be gritty and serious, but to still be sophisticated.

In order to ensure that the game was balanced, the designers had to play through maps several times to ensure that they were not unbalanced. Shimojo commented that once he became more astute at the game, it became hard for him to judge what it would be like for a novice to play, though he comments that his goal is to ensure that the difficulty level is right enough to allow the largest number of people to play it. Afterward, his comments are sent off to other staff members so he can be sure that he got it right. From then on, the game is sent to Nintendo's debugging team, who will then provide insight on the balance to the development team, who makes adjustments accordingly.

Shimojo commented that the balance checking basically went on until someone said: "Stop it, stop it, we really have to launch it now". He attributes this work to why Advance Wars is so highly revered. In designing maps, he comments that it is impossible to please everyone, explaining that some people prefer maps where they start out weak and grow stronger, while others prefer to start out strong and tear through their opponent. His goal was to ensure that there were enough maps that people could say "Here we go, here's one of my maps. This is what I was waiting for". The mechanic of unlocking maps was introduced into the game as a means of getting gamers to play the game for longer, but in an interview discussing why the feature was removed in the future title Advance Wars: Days of Ruin, a developer commented that it prevented people who were too busy to spend the time unlocking levels, and that there were better ways to keep players interested.

Advance Wars was originally intended to remain exclusive to Japan, like the previous entries in the series, which were kept in Japan due to Nintendo feeling that consumers would not be interested in turn-based games, or in such complicated games. In order to alleviate this, the developers made the mechanics easy to understand, adding in an in-depth tutorial that did not require players to read the manual. When Nintendo's US marketing division played the game, they found it to be great, wondering why they could not sell it in the US. Designer Kentaro Nishimura commented that "Advance Wars' success shifted Nintendo's attitude over western tastes". He added that without Advance Wars, Fire Emblem: The Blazing Blade, a game that he also designed, would never have been released outside Japan.

=== Virtual Console ===
The game was released on the Wii U Virtual Console on April 3, 2014, in North America and Europe. In Japan, the compilation which includes both Advance Wars and Advance Wars 2: Black Hole Rising games were released on the same day.

== Reception ==
Reception

Aggregate score
Aggregator	Score
Metacritic	92/100

Review scores
Publication	Score
AllGame	4.5/5
Edge	(2001) 9/10 (2013) 10/10
Electronic Gaming Monthly	7.5/10, 6.5/10, 8/10
Eurogamer	10/10
Game Informer	9.25/10
GamePro	4.5/5
GameSpot	9.1/10
GameSpy	95%
IGN	9.9/10
Nintendo Power	5/5

Upon release, the game received a score of 92/100 according to the review aggregation website Metacritic, indicating "universal acclaim". According to Julian Gollop, developer of X-COM and Rebelstar: Tactical Command, Advance Wars, besides being influential, opened up the market for similar games on handheld video game systems. It was rated the 26th best game made on a Nintendo System in Nintendo Power's Top 200 Games list.

Nintendo Power awarded the game a perfect 5 star rating, stating that "Advance Wars treads on new ground, taking the strategy genre to a place where gamers of all tastes will be gung-ho for it". The Electric Playground called the game "a deep, quite cartoony and consummately Japanese turn-based wargame with depth, character and replayability to burn". IGN called the game "incredibly intense and amazingly addictive... especially when you learn every little nuance of the game design". Gaming Age wrote: "There is a perfect blend of simplicity and complexity that makes this game so highly addictive". GameSpot said that the game is "deep and easy to learn, and it contains a level of replay rarely witnessed in handheld gaming". Total Video Games noted: "For a handheld, the AI of your computer-controlled opponents is surprisingly diverse and complex". AllGame commented: "Ingeniously designed, Advance Wars manages to be both in-depth, and instantly accessible, simply because it presents the game in easily manageable chunks". GameSpot named Advance Wars the best Game Boy Advance game of 2001. It was nominated for the publication's annual "Biggest Surprise" prize among console games, but lost to Metal Gear Solid 2: Sons of Liberty. During the 5th Annual Interactive Achievement Awards, the Academy of Interactive Arts & Sciences awarded Advance Wars with "Hand-Held Game of the Year".

In 2009, Official Nintendo Magazine called the game "an almost faultless blend of fiendish strategy and Nintendo magic", placing it 72nd on a list of greatest Nintendo games. In their October 2013 issue, Edge retroactively awarded the game ten out of ten, one of only twenty-three games to achieve that perfect score in the magazine's twenty-year history.
