= Advance Wars: Dual Strike =

2005 video game

- European box art
- Developer: Intelligent Systems (Note: Co-produced and supervised by Nintendo Software Planning & Development)
- Publisher: Nintendo
- Directors: Makoto Shimojo; Kentaro Nishimura
- Producers: Toru Narihiro; Hitoshi Yamagami
- Programmer: Takanori Hino
- Artist: Ryo Hirata
- Writers: Kouhei Maeda; Makoto Shimojo
- Composer: Yoshito Hirano
- Series: Wars
- Platform: Nintendo DS
- Release: JP: June 23, 2005; NA: August 22, 2005; EU: September 30, 2005; AU: March 22, 2006
- Genre: Turn-based strategy
- Modes: Single-player, multiplayer

Advance Wars: Dual Strike, known as Famicom Wars DS (Note: Japanese: ファミコンウォーズDS, Hepburn: Famikon Wōzu Dī Esu) in Japan, is a turn-based strategy video game developed by Intelligent Systems and published by Nintendo for the Nintendo DS handheld game console. It is the third installment in the Advance Wars series (the first on the DS) and was released in 2005 for Japan on June 23, in North America on August 22, in Europe on September 30 and in Australia on March 22, 2006.

The storyline is a continuation of the previous two games and is set in the new location of Omega Land. Black Hole has returned under the leadership of a new commander who seeks to give himself eternal life by draining the energy of Omega Land. The Allied Nations struggle to overcome this threat and are eventually joined by several former Black Hole commanding officers in an effort to save the land.

Advance Wars: Dual Strike received "universal acclaim" and also won several awards, including "Best Strategy Game for the DS" from IGN in 2005. It sold more than 35,000 copies in its first ten weeks in Japan. It was followed by a sequel, Advance Wars: Days of Ruin.

== Gameplay ==
The player's objective in Dual Strike is to defeat the enemy army with their own army. Except in some campaign missions with special objectives, there are two ways to defeat an opponent: destroy all of the enemy's units or capture their headquarters. The battle system is turn-based tactics. Two to four armies, each headed by one or two commanding officers (COs), take turns building and commanding units on grid-based maps. Every turn, units, which consist of ground, sea and air units, can move across the different types of terrain and attack enemy units or perform other actions, such as submerging a submarine or resupplying friendly units. Many factors can affect the battle, such as fog of war, a phenomenon that prevents players from seeing enemy units other than those in the visual range of their units; various weather conditions which change the terrain effects of the entire map; and CO powers.

=== COs and CO powers ===
All of the COs from the previous two games in the series, aside from Sturm, return in Dual Strike. In addition, nine new COs make an appearance; two for Orange Star, one each for Blue Moon, Yellow Comet, and Green Earth, and four for Black Hole, resulting in a total of 27 COs.

The namesake of Dual Strike is the ability to use two COs in a battle to command a single army. By using two COs, the weaknesses of each CO can effectively be covered by switching COs mid-battle. In addition, when using two COs, a new CO power named "Tag Power" or "Dual Strike" can be used. It allows players to use both COs' Super CO powers consecutively in the same turn, and effectively allows the player to have two turns.

Finally, COs in Dual Strike gain experience and can be promoted after each victorious battle in the War Room or Campaign. Higher ranked COs have access to different skills to tune and enhance their fighting styles. Abilities vary in type and benefit; some improve attack or defense, others increase the benefits of certain units or terrain types, while others affect the player's money flow. The star ranked skills must be unlocked by completing the Campaign modes. Each CO can use a maximum of four skills at once. Abilities can be changed around as many times as needed, but cannot be changed during a mission.

=== Dual Front ===
This campaign mission has two fronts. A different CO commands each army on each front.

The DS's two screens provide new ways of presenting a round of battle in Dual Strike. The bottom screen is where the main battle takes place, while the top screen is used to display the terrain and unit intelligence. However, in some missions, the top screen shows a second front. The second front is a second battle that is waged simultaneously with the battle on the lower screen, which is integral to some missions. The player can change the top screen back to the intel screen and vice versa, and units in the first front can be sent to the second. Units sent to the second front cannot be sent back to the first front.

When battling on two fronts, one CO on each team takes control of one front. The CO on the second front can either be controlled by a computer or by the player. If the battle on the second front ends before the battle on the first front, the winning CO will join their teammate on the first front or other advantages will be given to the victor. Any remaining units on the second front are then added to the victor's CO power meter.

=== New units and properties ===
There are seven new units. Three units operate on land: the Megatank, a Green Earth-developed tank that is the most powerful direct attack unit but has severely limited ammunition for its main cannon and a small movement range; the Piperunner, an indirect-fire vehicle which can only travel on pipelines or bases, but has a large movement and firing range; and the Oozium, a gelatinous blob which can only move one space per turn, but it can destroy any enemy it comes into contact with instantly.

There are two new naval units: the "Black Boat", which can repair and resupply any allied unit next to it, while capable of transporting two infantry/mech units; and the aircraft carrier, which can house two air units and is armed with surface-to-air missiles. In addition, the cruiser's missiles are now able to damage all naval units, making it more versatile.

A new air unit, the stealth fighter, has the ability to use stealth and turn invisible to all but adjacent enemy units. Similar to the submarine, the stealth bomber uses more fuel when stealth is activated, but it can only be attacked by certain units. The other new air unit is the Black Bomb, which can self-destruct, damaging units around it.

Other new features include the Com Tower, a new property that, when captured, increases the firepower of all allied units, although it provides no funds and cannot perform repairs. Black Crystals heal Black Hole units surrounding them. The Black Obelisk, which has the approximate look of a Black Cannon, also functions like a Black Crystal. The Rain weather effect now triggers Fog of War. Lastly, a new weather effect called the Sandstorm decreases both visibility and the attack range of all indirect fire units.

=== Campaign ===
The 28 missions (including an integrated tutorial and several secret lab missions unlocked by capturing a certain property in another mission) in Campaign mode that make up the game's storyline are objective-based, with most requiring the player to capture an enemy property. Some missions in Dual Strike's campaign make use of the Dual Fronts system.

Upon completing a mission, the player is awarded a rank, from C (lowest) to S (highest). The ranks are based on three categories: Power, Technique, and Speed. Power is determined by the number of enemy units destroyed in one turn, Technique by how many of the player's units are destroyed, and Speed by how fast the mission is completed. All three categories are rated on a scale from 0–100, and added together to form a numerical ranking from 0–300, in addition to the letter ranking. These are converted to points and are added to the player's overall points, which can be used to purchase War Room maps, Versus maps, and COs. Bonus points can also be earned by destroying certain items, such as Oozium or Black Obelisks in certain missions.

Hard Campaign can be unlocked, which is a more difficult version of the standard campaign. All unlocked COs can be used in Hard Campaign, including those unavailable in Normal Campaign. Three save slots are available for Campaign Mode.

=== New modes ===
Several new modes were added to the modes from Black Hole Rising and the original Advance Wars in Dual Strike. In addition to the old War Room, Versus, and Link modes, two new modes, named Survival and Combat, have been added.

The new Survival mode is a nonstop war of attrition. Depending on the mode, players are either given limited money, turns, or time to complete a series of maps. However, victory often can be achieved by reaching preset requirements instead of satisfying the normal victory conditions. The ranking received depends on the amount of the given resource remaining at the end of the maps.

The new Combat mode, is a multidirectional shooter rendition of the game. While the victory conditions for Combat are identical to any other battle, where the goal is to capture the opponent's HQ or defeat all enemies, players do not take turns. Instead, players fight in real time, controlling one of four different types of units, Mech, Recon, Tank, and Artillery, at a time with the touchpad. Each has strengths and weaknesses when graded in the four categories of firepower, rate of fire, movement speed, and capture speed, and their respective strengths and weaknesses resemble those of the units in the main game. Players must fight through six levels, each on a different map against a different CO. Units are bought before the first game of each set and must last through all six levels, as extra units cannot be purchased and can only be gained when a factory is captured. Multiplayer for this mode is supported, unlike Survival. Up to eight players on up to four teams can battle. Computer-controlled units, which take on a gray color, may also be added into a match. A demo of Dual Strike, containing the Combat mode, can be sent Wirelessly to other DS units.

=== Multiplayer ===
Dual Strike fields extensive multiplayer modes that come in two forms: Versus mode and Link mode. In Versus mode, only one DS system is used, and the single DS is passed from player to player. These matches can be set up with any combination of human players and computer-controlled armies. Link mode is the same game as Versus mode gameplay-wise, but each player has a separate console and copy of Dual Strike. Two to eight people can participate in wireless multiplayer games. Maps created by players by the Map Editor can also be traded wirelessly to other players.

== Plot ==
Dual Strike stars two new characters: Jake, and Rachel, Jake's advisor. These are the primary protagonists of Dual Strike and members of the Orange Star Army, and are accompanied by several other new protagonists, including Sasha, Grimm, and Javier, members of the Blue Moon, Yellow Comet, and Green Earth Armies respectively.

The Black Hole Army has returned under a new commander, Von Bolt. He is accompanied by his Bolt Guard: Jugger, Koal, and Kindle, along with Hawke and Lash from the original Black Hole Army. Using Lash's new Black Obelisks, Von Bolt is draining Omega Land of its energy to give him eternal life, and is also starting to use this power to produce a bio-weapon named Oozium 238, a strange slime-based monster that devours anything in its path. However, Hawke notices the energy draining (which also is turning Omega Land into a desert) and questions its use. After uncovering Von Bolt's plot, Hawke is betrayed and Von Bolt attempts to swarm Hawke and Lash with Oozium 238. After the Allied Nations’ COs save Hawke and Lash, the COs, along with Hawke and Lash, begin to turn the tide against the Black Hole Army. Both Hawke and Lash provide valuable intelligence of the Black Hole weaponry and its plans for Omega Land.

With this information, the Allied Nations slowly corner the Black Hole Army, leading to a battle in the middle of the Crimson Sea. After destroying the last Black Obelisk, the Allied Nations proceed to the final battle where they fight Von Bolt and a giant oozium known as the Grand Bolt. After destroying the Grand Bolt, Hawke (or Jake, based on the player's decision) destroys Von Bolt's life support chair, supposedly causing both Hawke and Von Bolt to die in the aftermath. With the Black Obelisks gone, Omega Land begins returning to normal. Hawke is revealed to have stolen Von Bolt's chair and escaped, leaving Von Bolt either dead or barely alive. With the power in Von Bolt's chair Hawke revives all the land.

== Development ==
Dual Strike was first announced under the title Advance Wars: DS as a first-party DS release in a Nintendo press release in October 2004 and it was to be released in the year following the DS's release. In March, the Japanese release date was revealed to be June 23, 2005, under the title Famicom Wars DS. In May, the game was showcased at the 2005 Electronic Entertainment Expo, when the official title was also announced. The American release date for Dual Strike was set to August 22 and the European release date for September 30.

Advance Wars: Dual Strike was developed by Intelligent Systems and published by Nintendo. The executive producer was Satoru Iwata, the CEO of Nintendo. The producer was Tohru Nariho and the game was directed by Makoto Shimojo.

Wireless play was originally planned for the game, but wireless was not part of the Electronic Entertainment Expo build and Nintendo was therefore unable to demonstrate its capabilities. By the final release build of the game, local wireless, but not Nintendo Wi-Fi, was implemented and supported two to four players in Normal Battle mode, two players in DS Battle, and up to 8 players in Combat mode.

== Reception ==
Reception

Aggregate score
Aggregator	Score
Metacritic	90/100

Review scores
Publication	Score
Edge	8/10
Electronic Gaming Monthly	8.83/10
Eurogamer	9/10
Famitsu	34/40
Game Informer	9.25/10
GamePro	4.5/5
GameRevolution	A−
GameSpot	9.2/10
GameSpy	4.5/5
GameTrailers	9/10
GameZone	9/10
IGN	9/10
Nintendo Power	9/10
Detroit Free Press	4/4
The Sydney Morning Herald	4.5/5

Advance Wars: Dual Strike received "universal acclaim" according to the review aggregation website Metacritic. 1UP.com commented that the game "is a much greater step forward in the series than its predecessor, Advance Wars: Black Hole Rising" and that the game was greatly enhanced by the addition of a second screen. While the game had drawbacks, including the dialogue, the lack of depth in the Combat mode, and the unbalanced COs, it was also cited as "the standard against which other strategy games, handheld or otherwise, should be judged".

IGN praised the game for being "a fantastic single-player game...enhanced further with multiplayer focus for single and multiple cart users". Though IGN thought the game "doesn't offer anything entirely new or unique", the game contains "some of the most engrossing turn-based action on the Nintendo DS system".

In general, the game was generally found to be extremely similar to previous games, which had both drawbacks and benefits. GameSpot commented that the visuals all felt "recycled" but the game had great depth and was addictive regardless. Game Informer considered the game "the first must-have title for the system" while the innovations improved an already solid core gameplay. Similarly, Eurogamer commented that the game correctly ported the game to DS without losing the essence of the GBA game. The "variety and depth" did not cause a loss of the "unique and enjoyable" aspects of the game. In Japan, Famitsu gave it a score of two nines and two eights for a total of 34 out of 40.

Detroit Free Press gave it a score of all four stars and said: "There are campaigns that will keep you awake at night, second-guessing your tactics, long after you shut the DS off". The New York Times gave it universal acclaim: "With the new features and the improved interface of the DS added to the virtually perfect game mechanics that have always distinguished the series, Dual Strike is arguably the best Advance Wars game to date, although the almost perfect nature of the previous games makes that a tough call". The Sydney Morning Herald gave it four-and-a-half stars out of five, saying that "the cute Japanese animation belies the tactical intricacy".

Advance Wars: Dual Strike was the 301st best-selling game of 2005 in Japan, selling around 35,000 copies in its first ten weeks.

The game was awarded the Editor's Choice Award by both IGN and GameSpot. GameSpy also awarded the game "Game of the Month" in August 2005. It also won Best Strategy Game for the DS and was a runner-up for the Best Strategy Game on any platform in 2005.
