= Battalion Wars =

2005 video game

- North American cover art
- Developer: Kuju London
- Publisher: Nintendo
- Director: Miles Henry-Nerud
- Producer: Kensuke Tanabe
- Designers: Benoît Maçon; Andrew Trowers
- Programmer: Jon Robinson
- Artists: Cumron Ashtiani; Ben Hebb
- Writers: Richard Boon (story); Paul Mackman
- Composers: Nick Arundel; Justin Scharvona
- Series: Wars
- Platform: GameCube
- Release: NA: 19 September 2005; JP: 27 October 2005; EU: 9 December 2005; AU: 16 February 2006
- Genres: Action, real-time tactics
- Mode: Single-player

Battalion Wars, released as Assault!! Famicom Wars (Note: Japanese: 突撃!!ファミコンウォーズ, Hepburn: Totsugeki!! Famikon Wōzu) in Japan, is a 2005 real-time tactics game developed by Kuju London and published by Nintendo for the GameCube. The player controls a vast array of units ranging from infantry, armoured divisions and aircraft, completing missions through a mixture of unit management and strategic planning. In the game's story, the player operates as a commander of a battalion, who initially take part in a conflict between two nations that culminates in an eventual alliance between them, in response to a surprise attack by a third nation.

The game received generally favourable reviews upon release, and led to the creation of a sequel, entitled Battalion Wars 2, for the Wii in 2007.

== Gameplay ==
The game features only a single-player campaign, played from a third-person perspective, in which players take control of a variety of units that form a battalion, to complete a series of missions. Gameplay features a mixture of elements from both third-person shooters and real-time tactics games. In each mission, players complete a series of objectives, both primary and secondary, earning a rank depending on the final score they achieve, much like in Advance Wars, determined in three categories - Power is determined by how many enemy units were destroyed in the mission; Technique is determined by how many of the player's units survived; and Speed is determined by how long it took the player to complete a mission, against the mission's Par time. While the campaign's missions focus primarily on controlling forces from one of the game's four factions, bonus missions are unlocked if the player achieves an average score for a set of missions, allowing them to take control of troops from one of the other four factions.

For each mission, the player is given a variety of units to utilise, including infantry, armoured vehicles, and aircraft (with the exception of Air Transports), in which the number and types that can be used vary between missions; more troops can be earned as reinforcements depending on the player's progress in a mission or from capturing POW camps and helipads. While one single unit is controlled fully by the player, whom the camera focuses primarily on, the rest are given orders by the player that range from following them, moving to a location, holding ground, or guarding another unit, to attacking enemy units and structures. Players can give orders to the whole battalion, a company of the same units, or individual units, allowing for flexibility and strategic planning for upcoming engagements, depending on a given situation (i.e. defending a location). While the camera is focused on the player's unit, it can be freely switched between an over-the-shoulder viewpoint, to a battlefield overview viewpoint. The in-game HUD comprises a mini-radar that denotes the location of objectives, and units - friendly, allies, and hostile - along with the battalion bar at the bottom, which lists the units and the number in a company that the player has. In addition to the HUD, the player can also pause the game to review Mission Logs, Objectives, and view the map of the mission's battlefield, allowing them to locate the position of units and current objectives.

Units featured in the game are based on those from the Advance Wars series, though Battalion Wars features unique units, including: light and heavy recon units; a wider variety of infantry units that cover basic riflemen, to units specialised against particular units (i.e. anti-air), and long-range mortar companies; "battlestation" tanks; and "stratodestroyer" aircraft. Units function similarly to their counterparts in Advance Wars, though with some differences. Infantry units can use cover to reduce the threat of enemy fire, can man mounted gun emplacements, and can be healed individually by collecting first aid kits dropped by eliminated enemy infantry. Furthermore, some objectives require players to take control of certain points (represented as flags), which only infantry can capture. Vehicle and air units, along with their primary weapons and abilities, have manned machine guns that work autonomously against enemy units, and can be repaired by picking up jerry cans dropped by destroyed enemy vehicles. With the exception of ground vehicles, players gain additional controls when taking full control of an infantry unit, allowing them to jump over obstacles and dodge enemy fire by rolling to the side, while taking control of an air unit allows them to adjust its altitude in order to avoid enemy fire.

== Plot ==
=== Setting ===
The game's world consists of five nations, spread across two large continents and a series of islands and archipelagos. The western continent consists of a mixture of rugged canyons in the west and wide plains and forests, to frozen tundra and snowy mountains and forested valleys in the east. The continent is shared between the Western Frontier in the west, based upon the United States and whom the player controls throughout the campaign, and the Tundran Territories in the east, based upon Russia. The eastern continent consists of a desert province in the west, called the Dune Sea, and a large gothic-themed landscape in the east, which is home to the nation of Xylvania, a country based on a mixture of pre-World War I Germany, modern Romania, vampires, and Gothic themes. The southern seas consist of several islands, including a large archipelago to the south of the western continent, which is home to the Solar Empire, a nation based upon Japan with a mixture of traditional Japanese and high-tech futuristic themes.

=== Characters ===
The game's main protagonists are the commanding officers of the Western Frontier - General Herman, the leader of the Frontier forces; Colonel Austin, a resourceful officer; and Brigadier Betty, a young, energetic woman, whose uniform is based on a cheerleaders outfit. Leading the Tundran Territories are its officers - Tsar Gorgi, the country's former ruler who believes in strength; Marshall Nova, Gorgi's son and successor, devoted to modern progress and peace; and Major Nelly, an experienced female officer. Leading the Solar Empire is its ruler, Empress Lei-Qo - a wise woman with mystical powers. Their main antagonists are the commanding officers of Xylvania - Kaiser Vlad, the country's ruler; Kommandant Ubel, a hulking monster of a man; and Countess Ingrid, a devoted female pilot veteran.

=== Story ===
Following a previous war between the Western Frontier and Tundran Territories, both sides maintain an uneasy truce with each other, while maintaining a constant vigil of each other's forces at the demilitarized zone along their borders. General Herman, head of the Frontier's armies, agrees to a suggestion made by his subordinate, Brigadier Betty, to hold a military exercise for their troops to ensure they remain fit for duty. During the exercise, a recon scout spots several Tundran armored divisions invading their territories at the command of Tsar Gorgi. Having recently been succeeded by his son Marshal Nova as the country's new political and military leader, Gorgi despised the promise of peace between the two nations and decided to strengthen his nation's might by secretly invading and defeating the Frontier, effectively ending the truce between the two nations. Learning of his father's actions, Nova forbids Gorgi from participating further in the war he started, determined to end the conflict himself with his second-in-command, Major Nelly, leading Tundran forces.

As the Frontier forces begin to start winning the conflict, defeating Tundran forces in a series of battles, Gorgi travels to Xylvania, a country that had been ravaged by the rivalry of the two nations, to form a pact with its leader Kaiser Vlad. However, Vlad betrays him by having bombers, commanded by his subordinate Countess Ingrid, attack both armies. Horrified by this, Gorgi goes into exile out of shame for his actions. Weakened after the Xylvanian assault, both Herman and Nova call a ceasefire between their armies, effectively ending the conflict. Both nations decide to join forces, forming the Alliance of Nations, in order to retaliate against the Xylvanians as they prepare to attack both countries.

Seeking to weaken their enemies, the Alliance conducts operations within the Dune Sea, in order to prevent their enemies from drilling for nerocite, an essential resource used as vehicle fuel. Despite difficulties in their final battle, the Alliance is aided by Gorgi, after he comes out of exile to assist in the conflict in his own personal fighter. Although the Xylvanians are driven out for good, Gorgi is mortally wounded by Vlad's right-hand man Kommandant Ubel. Before dying, Gorgi apologises to Nova for his actions, leaving his son to vow for revenge for his father's death. Learning that the Xylvanians seek to invade the Solar Empire, Colonel Austin, a Frontier officer, has the Alliance make contact with its leader, Empress Lei-Qo, in order to offer assistance in repelling Vlad's invasion, in exchange for her assistance in invading Xylvania.

As the Alliance begins invading into Xylvanian territory, Ingrid decides to take action to stop the invasion. Stealing an ancient sword from Vlad, Ingrid uses it to awaken the country's ancient army, known as the Iron Legion. In doing so, Ingrid is driven insane by the Legion's power, causing her to attack both the Alliance and Xylvanian forces. Finding themselves forced to stop the Legion, the Alliance fights towards the Legion's source of power, the Cenotaph, and destroy it. In the wake of its destruction, Lei-Qo arrives and kills Ingrid, ending her madness and the threat of the Legion. Following the conflict, the Alliance finally reaches the Xylvanian capital of Vladstag, and defeat the last remaining forces guarding it. Although Vlad escapes, the Alliance captures Ubel, imprisoning him. With the Xylvanians defeated, the Alliance celebrates the end of the war, though Nova points out to Betty that his father left him a parting lesson - in order for him to strive for peace, he must be prepared for war.

== Development ==
The game was originally titled Advance Wars: Under Fire during development and was originally planned to be tied into the Advance Wars series of games. However, its concept never intended to have this connection in mind, and because of its otherwise unrelated gameplay elements and storyline, the title was ultimately changed for Western release to avoid connections to the Advance Wars branding, while the Japanese version was released under the Famicom Wars branding.

== Reception ==
Reception

Aggregate score
Aggregator	Score
Metacritic	76/100

Review scores
Publication	Score
Edge	7/10
Electronic Gaming Monthly	6.5/10
Eurogamer	7/10
Famitsu	31/40
Game Informer	5.5/10
GamePro	4/5
GameRevolution	D
GameSpot	8.3/10
GameSpy	4/5
GameZone	8/10
IGN	8.8/10
Nintendo Power	8.5/10
Detroit Free Press	4/4
The Sydney Morning Herald	4/5

The game received "generally favourable reviews" according to the review aggregation website Metacritic. In Japan, Famitsu gave it a score of three eights and one seven for a total of 31 out of 40.

X-Play complemented the game's emphasis on strategy and third person shooting as well as its cartoonish art style while criticizing the sometimes clunky controls and lack of multiplayer.

== Sequel ==
There is a sequel to Battalion Wars, titled Battalion Wars 2 for the Nintendo Wii, with a storyline that continues shortly after where the original Battalion Wars leaves off. The sequel delves further into the backstory and includes more territories, along with introducing new land, air, and sea vehicles for the players to utilise.
