= Intelligent Systems =

Japanese video game developer

Intelligent Systems Co., Ltd.
- Logotype
- Native name: 株式会社インテリジェントシステムズ
- Romanized name: Kabushiki gaisha Interijento Shisutemuzu
- Type: Kabushiki gaisha
- Industry: Video games
- Founded: 1983; 43 years ago (as a division under Iwasaki Giken Kogyo) December 1986; 39 years ago (as a separate entity)
- Founder: Toru Narihiro
- Headquarters: Minami-ku, Kyoto, Japan
- Key people: Ryouichi Kitanishi (chairman); Toshiyuki Nakamura (president)
- Products: Paper Mario series; Fire Emblem series; WarioWare series; Wars series
- Number of employees: 223 (2026)
- Subsidiaries: Purejio Co., Ltd. (株式会社プレジオ)
- Website: intsys.co.jp/english intsys.co.jp

Intelligent Systems Co., Ltd. (Note: Japanese: 株式会社インテリジェントシステムズ, Hepburn: Kabushiki gaisha Interijento Shisutemuzu) (IS, pronounced like the word “is”) is a Japanese video game developer best known for developing games published by Nintendo with the Paper Mario, Fire Emblem, WarioWare, and Wars video game series.

The company is well known for almost exclusively working with Nintendo, despite not being owned by Nintendo in any capacity; some exceptions include various Dragon Quest games, which were published by Square Enix.

== History ==
Intelligent Systems originated as Iwasaki Giken in 1983 to develop games for Nintendo. This original group of developers worked on titles like Mario Bros., Wild Gunman, Duck Hunt, Hogan's Alley, Donkey Kong 3, Devil World, Wrecking Crew, Metroid, and more.

When the Nintendo Research & Development team was reorganized during the production of the Game Boy, the team was officially separated. In 1986, this group was established by Tohru Narihiro as Intelligent Systems. Ryoichi Kitanishi served as company CEO.

Narihiro was tasked with porting software developed for the Famicom Disk System to ROM cartridges for the NES in West. The team became an auxiliary program unit for Nintendo that provided system tools and hired people to program, fix, or port Nintendo-developed software. Much of the team's original work was developed alongside Nintendo R&D1. During this time, Intelligent Systems was one of four companies that Nintendo used to code the majority of its games. Others included Pax Softnica, SRD, and HAL Laboratory.

In 1988, IS developed Famicom Wars. Under game designer Shouzou Kaga, Intelligent Systems and Nintendo R&D1 released Fire Emblem: Shadow Dragon and the Blade of Light in 1990. It was the first time that the company took the lead on game design and graphics. Intelligent Systems began to hire graphic designers, programmers, and musicians to extend the company from an auxiliary–tool developer to a game development group. During development of the Super NES, Intelligent Systems was split into four smaller teams in order to develop games like Super Scope 6, Mario Paint, and Super Metroid. Following the success of Fire Emblem, multiple Fire Emblem titles were released under Kaga.

Intelligent Systems struggled to adjust to 3D game development during the Nintendo 64 era. Kaga left the company after Thracia 776, the fifth game in the series. After five years of development, Fire Emblem 64 was cancelled, though Paper Mario was released in 2000.

In 2001, the company released Mario Kart: Super Circuit, and Advance Wars on the Game Boy Advance. This was the first Mario Kart game to be developed outside of Nintendo. That same year, Fire Emblem characters Marth and Roy were included in Super Smash Bros. Melee, and Western fans began to take interest in the franchise. In 2003, the company had 81 employees and moved to Nintendo's Kyoto Research Center in Higashiyama-ku, Kyoto, where it share space with Nintendo’s Software Planning & Development division. Nintendo would release Fire Emblem: The Blazing Blade on the Game Boy Advance, the first game in the series to be localized for the West. Within a decade, sales of Fire Emblem games had fallen in the West. Nintendo and Intelligent Systems had decided that 2012's Fire Emblem Awakening would be the last in the series, unless it could sell 250,000 copies. The game proved to be a great success in its first year, selling 400,000 units in Japan alone. It ultimately became the best-selling game in the series in the West and the fastest-selling entry in Japan.

Toshiyuki Nakamura was named president and CEO in April 2010. In October 2013, Intelligent Systems moved to a newly constructed office near Nintendo's new headquarters. The company had 130 employees at this time. In 2019, Intelligent Systems released Fire Emblem: Three Houses, the franchise's first game on a home console in 12 years. IS partnered with Koei Tecmo, providing the main plot, game system, and mechanics, while Koei handled the bulk of the programming. By 2020, the staff had increased to 169 employees.

In 2020, Intelligent Systems finally released a localized version of Fire Emblem: Shadow Dragon and the Blade of Light in the West for the 30th anniversary of the game. It remained in the Nintendo eShop for four months before being delisted.

=== Mobile apps ===
In February 2017, Intelligent Systems released a free-to-play gacha mobile game, called Fire Emblem Heroes. Nintendo and DeNA assisted in development. By the end of 2018, it had grossed an estimated $452 million worldwide. To celebrate the game's third year, Intelligent Systems unveiled a subscription plan that would give players cosmetics, extra missions, and power boosts. By 2022, the game had exceeded $1 billion in lifetime revenue. It has made more money than Mario Kart Tour and Animal Crossing: Pocket Camp combined, and more than 10 times as Super Mario Run.

A second mobile game, Fire Emblem Shadows, was launched by Intelligent Systems and DeNA in September 2025. This game used real-time combat and social deduction gameplay elements similar to Among Us. However, the iOS app made just $90,000 in its first week, far behind Heroes.

Their third mobile game, "Pictonico!", is a free to play mobile game released on May 27th, 2026. It was developed by Intelligent Systems and published by Nintendo. It is a game where players can use their camera or use their pictures on their phone and turn them into WarioWare-like microgames. Each only last a few seconds and are controlled with the device's touch screen.

== Development tools ==
Intelligent Systems has produced development support tools for most Nintendo consoles. These include emulators, debuggers, software CDs, and more.

It developed the Wide Boy development tool, which allowed developers to play Game Boy games on a television. Nintendo later released it to the public as the Super Game Boy. Intelligent Systems also created the Wide Boy 64 for the Nintendo 64 console. It created software CDs for Game Boy Advance developers.

The company helped to develop the camera app for the Nintendo 3DS, contributing to the feature that allowed users to merge the faces of two people together.

== List of games developed ==
List of video games developed by Intelligent Systems
Year	Title	Platform(s)	Note	Ref.
1983	Mario Bros.	Nintendo Entertainment System	Co-developed with Nintendo R&D1	
1984	Tennis	Nintendo Entertainment System	Co-developed with Nintendo R&D1	
1984	Wild Gunman	Nintendo Entertainment System	Co-developed with Nintendo R&D1	
1984	Duck Hunt	Nintendo Entertainment System	Co-developed with Nintendo R&D1	
1984	Hogan's Alley	Nintendo Entertainment System		
1984	Donkey Kong 3	Nintendo Entertainment System		
1984	Devil World	Nintendo Entertainment System	Co-developed with Nintendo R&D1	
1985	Soccer	Nintendo Entertainment System		
1985	Wrecking Crew	Nintendo Entertainment System		
1985	Stack-Up	Nintendo Entertainment System	Co-developed with Nintendo R&D1	
1985	Gyromite	Nintendo Entertainment System	Co-developed with Nintendo R&D1	
1986	Tennis	Famicom Disk System		
1986	Soccer	Famicom Disk System		
1986	Metroid	Famicom Disk System	Co-developed with Nintendo R&D1	
1988	Famicom Wars	Famicom	Co-developed with Nintendo R&D1	
1988	Kaettekita Mario Bros.	Famicom Disk System		
1988	Wrecking Crew	Famicom Disk System		
1989	Alleyway	Game Boy	Co-developed with Nintendo R&D1	
1989	Baseball	Game Boy	Responsible for porting the original game to the Game Boy.	
1989	Yakuman	Game Boy		
1989	Golf	Game Boy		
1990	Fire Emblem: Shadow Dragon and the Blade of Light	Famicom	Co-developed with Nintendo R&D1	
1990	Backgammon	Famicom Disk System		
1991	SimCity	Super Nintendo Entertainment System		
1991	Game Boy Wars	Game Boy	Co-developed with Nintendo R&D1	
1992	Super Scope 6	Super Nintendo Entertainment System		
1992	Fire Emblem Gaiden	Famicom		
1992	Mario Paint	Super Nintendo Entertainment System		
1992	Kaeru no Tame ni Kane wa Naru	Game Boy	Co-developed with Nintendo R&D1	
1992	Battle Clash	Super Nintendo Entertainment System		
1993	Metal Combat: Falcon's Revenge	Super Nintendo Entertainment System		
1994	Fire Emblem: Mystery of the Emblem	Super Famicom		
1994	Super Metroid	Super Nintendo Entertainment System	Co-developed with Nintendo R&D1	
1994	Wario's Woods	Super Nintendo Entertainment System		
1995	Galactic Pinball	Virtual Boy		
1995	Panel de Pon	Super Famicom		
1996	Fire Emblem: Genealogy of the Holy War	Super Famicom		
1996	Tetris Attack	Super Nintendo Entertainment System	Co-developed with Nintendo R&D1	
1998	Super Famicom Wars	Super Famicom		
1999	Fire Emblem: Thracia 776	Super Famicom		
2000	Trade & Battle: Card Hero	Game Boy Color	Co-developed with Nintendo R&D1	
2000	Paper Mario	Nintendo 64		
2000	Pokémon Puzzle Challenge	Game Boy Color		
2001	Advance Wars	Game Boy Advance	Released as Game Boy Wars Advance 1+2 in Japan in 2004.	
2001	Mario Kart: Super Circuit	Game Boy Advance		
2002	Cubivore: Survival of the Fittest	GameCube	Co-developed with Saru Brunei	
2002	Fire Emblem: The Binding Blade	Game Boy Advance		
2003	Nintendo Puzzle Collection	GameCube	Co-developed with Nintendo R&D1	
2003	Fire Emblem: The Blazing Blade	Game Boy Advance		
2003	Advance Wars 2: Black Hole Rising	Game Boy Advance	Released as Game Boy Wars Advance 1+2 in Japan in 2004.	
2003	WarioWare, Inc.: Mega Party Games!	GameCube	Co-developed with Nintendo R&D1	
2004	Paper Mario: The Thousand-Year Door	GameCube		
2004	Fire Emblem: The Sacred Stones	Game Boy Advance		
2004	WarioWare: Twisted!	Game Boy Advance	Co-developed with Nintendo SPD	
2004	WarioWare: Touched!	Nintendo DS	Co-developed with Nintendo SPD	
2005	Fire Emblem: Path of Radiance	GameCube		
2005	Advance Wars: Dual Strike	Nintendo DS		
2005	Dr. Mario & Puzzle League	Game Boy Advance		
2006	WarioWare: Smooth Moves	Wii	Co-developed with Nintendo SPD	
2007	Fire Emblem: Radiant Dawn	Wii		
2007	Super Paper Mario	Wii		
2007	Planet Puzzle League	Nintendo DS		
2007	Face Training	Nintendo DS		
2007	Kousoku Card Battle: Card Hero	Nintendo DS	Co-developed with Nintendo SPD	
2008	Advance Wars: Days of Ruin	Nintendo DS		
2008	Fire Emblem: Shadow Dragon	Nintendo DS		
2008	WarioWare: Snapped!	Nintendo DSi	Co-developed with Nintendo SPD	
2009	WarioWare D.I.Y.	Nintendo DS		
2009	WarioWare D.I.Y. Showcase	Wii	Co-developed with Nintendo SPD	
2009	Dragon Quest Wars	Nintendo DS	Published by Square Enix	
2009	Eco Shooter: Plant 530	Wii		
2009	Nintendo DSi Instrument Tuner	Nintendo DSi		
2009	Nintendo DSi Metronome	Nintendo DSi		
2009	Dictionary 6 in 1 with Camera Function	Nintendo DSi		
2009	Link 'n' Launch	Nintendo DSi		
2009	Spotto!	Nintendo DSi		
2010	Fire Emblem: New Mystery of the Emblem	Nintendo DS		
2011	Pushmo	Nintendo 3DS		
2011	Dragon Quest 25th Anniversary Collection	Wii		
2012	Fire Emblem Awakening	Nintendo 3DS		
2012	Crashmo	Nintendo 3DS		
2012	Paper Mario: Sticker Star	Nintendo 3DS		
2013	Game & Wario	Wii U	Co-developed with Nintendo SPD	
2013	Daigasso! Band Brothers P	Nintendo 3DS	Co-developed with Nintendo SDD	
2014	Pushmo World	Wii U		
2015	Code Name: S.T.E.A.M.	Nintendo 3DS		
2015	Stretchmo	Nintendo 3DS		
2015	Fire Emblem Fates	Nintendo 3DS		
2016	Paper Mario: Color Splash	Wii U		
2017	Fire Emblem Heroes	iOS, Android	Co-developed with DeNa	
2017	Fire Emblem Echoes: Shadows of Valentia	Nintendo 3DS		
2018	WarioWare Gold	Nintendo 3DS		
2019	Fire Emblem: Three Houses	Nintendo Switch	Co-developed with Kou Shibusawa	
2020	Paper Mario: The Origami King	Nintendo Switch		
2021	WarioWare: Get It Together!	Nintendo Switch		
2023	Fire Emblem Engage	Nintendo Switch		
2023	WarioWare: Move It!	Nintendo Switch		
2024	Paper Mario: The Thousand-Year Door	Nintendo Switch		
2025	Fire Emblem Shadows	iOS, Android	Co-developed with DeNa	
2026	Pictonico!	iOS, Android	Co-developed with Nintendo EPD	
2026	Dragon Hopper	Virtual Boy (Nintendo Classics)		
2026	Fire Emblem: Fortune's Weave	Nintendo Switch 2		

=== Cancelled ===
Title	System	Ref(s)
Fire Emblem: Maiden of Darkness	Nintendo 64DD	
Untitled Fire Emblem game	Wii	
Crashmo World	Wii U	

== See also ==
- OrCAD (distributed by Intelligent Systems Japan, KK)
