= Silent Hill: Townfall =

- Developer: Screen Burn Interactive
- Publishers: Konami Digital Entertainment; Annapurna Interactive
- Director: Jon McKellan
- Producer: Motoi Okamoto
- Designer: Graeme McKellan
- Programmer: James Hancox
- Artists: Paul Abbott; Jon McKellan
- Writer: Jon McKellan
- Composer: Pilotpriest
- Series: Silent Hill
- Engine: Unreal Engine 5
- Platforms: PlayStation 5; Windows
- Release: 24 September 2026 (Note: Pre-ordering the Deluxe Edition granted 48-hour early access beginning on 22 September 2026.)
- Genre: Survival horror
- Mode: Single-player

Silent Hill: Townfall is a 2026 survival horror game developed by Screen Burn Interactive, and published by Konami Digital Entertainment and Annapurna Interactive. It is a standalone spin-off of the Silent Hill franchise. Set in 1996 in the fictional Scottish town of St. Amelia, it follows Simon Ordell after he wakes up in a place to which he seemingly has no connection. It features a cast starring Jovan Adepo, Kezia Burrows and Terry O'Quinn.

Townfall was released for PlayStation 5 and Windows on 24 September 2026. It received generally favourable reviews.

== Gameplay ==
Silent Hill: Townfall is played from a first-person perspective and focuses on three different characters (Simon, Zoe and Richard) across six chapters. While each character can use melee weapons such as planks and pipes to defend themselves, as well as ranged weapons such as a pistol, shotgun and flare gun, they can also use stealth to hide from enemies and make their way through the environment undetected. They can also throw bottles and bricks to either distract enemies momentarily, or to stun them briefly. Simon is equipped with a CRTV handheld device which allows him to detect the location of nearby enemies through any obstacles or walls.

== Plot ==
Simon Ordell awakens on the shores of the Scottish island town of St. Amelia with no memory of how or why he is there. Exploring the town, he finds it is shrouded in fog and completely abandoned save for numerous monsters roaming the streets. He finds a portable television, branded as CRTV, and is contacted by a man named Richard, who urges Simon to fulfil an unspecified purpose. Simon also encounters Zoe Ellis, a local nurse he has some form of connection to. As Simon follows both Zoe and Richard's trails, he collects clues around the town as well as views recordings transmitted to his CRTV that begin to explain the situation to him. He, Zoe, and Richard all appear to be trapped in a purgatory-like realm that takes the form of St. Amelia, where they are doomed to eternally relive the events that caused their feelings of guilt.

Back in the real world, St. Amelia was a struggling fishing town that was revitalised thanks to investment from the petrochemical company Chapman Energy Group, which had built a corporate campus and refinery on the island to support the nearby SWDP oil rig. However, a catastrophic fire broke out on the SWDP, resulting in the deaths of all 95 workers on board. Simon was present on the oil rig as an independent safety inspector and ended up being the sole survivor. Zoe tended to Simon and performed lifesaving surgery on him, and he was airlifted to the mainland for further treatment. The people of St. Amelia then turned their anger against CEG, accusing them of cutting corners on safety and covering up serious deficiencies. CEG, in turn, laid the blame on its CEO Richard Shaw, who had bypassed inspection on one of the rig's components. In desperation, Richard promised to arrange a lifesaving heart transplant for Simon, but in return Simon would have to provide false testimony claiming that Richard and CEG were not at fault. While he initially agreed to the deal, Simon began to have second thoughts due to his conscience.

In the otherworld, these circumstances result in Simon being trapped due to his guilt over his complicity in covering up the SWDP disaster, Zoe being trapped because of her regret over failing to save her patients, and Richard being trapped due to his refusal to accept accountability for the SWDP disaster. Simon is determined to make things right, but Zoe warns him the otherworld does not give him the power to change the past, merely to accept it. After defeating the monster representing his guilt, Simon confronts the unrepentant Richard and depending on the player's choices, multiple endings are possible:

- "Abandoned": Simon decides to shoot Richard, only to see his corpse appear all around them; Richard mocks him over the CRTV while Zoe is disappointed, realizing that Simon refuses to accept that he cannot "fix" what happened. In the real world, from his hospital bed, Simon murders Richard by stabbing him in the neck with a scalpel.
- "Justice": Simon chooses to fire a flare into the air, recognizing his complicity and that the people of St. Amelia deserve justice for Richard's negligence; this attracts the attention of a rig-like monster towards them, while Zoe is relieved to find the loop has finally ended. In the real world, Simon is stabbed in his hospital bed by Richard due to his refusal to testify, with the implication that the attempted murder will ensure Richard's conviction.
- "Forever": Simon fires off a flare into the air, but his inability to fully accept his role in the coverup results in him losing consciousness and waking up back at the beginning of the loop, with Zoe treating his injuries shortly after the SWDP disaster and promising she won't abandon him.
- "Dog": In this joke ending, a talking dog statue interrupts Simon and Richard's confrontation and convinces them to resolve their differences peacefully over beers.
- "Sci Fi": In this joke ending, Simon awakens from suspended animation and finds himself on a starship traveling into deep space, with Zoe's voice beckoning him to turn the ship around and rescue her.

== Development ==
Silent Hill: Townfall began development in 2022 by Scottish studio No Code. Konami was made aware of No Code by co-publisher Annapurna Interactive and trusted their recommendation due to their success with narrative-driven indie games. Silent Hill series producer Motoi Okamoto had played their previous titles Stories Untold and Observation so felt confident in tasking them with developing their own Silent Hill title. In July 2025, No Code rebranded as Screen Burn Interactive as a nod to their work on Silent Hill: Townfall with the name Screen Burn capturing the "ghost of an image burned into an old CRT screen" and how a video game can be burned into someone's memory. Screen Burn is an independent studio with development undertaken by a small team of only 30 people with Leanne Loombe, head of games at Annapurna, saying that the studio was "afforded the development time to really realise their creative vision" given their size. Townfall was released for PlayStation 5 and Windows via Steam on 24 September 2026, with the Windows version later releasing on GOG.com on October 9, 2026.

=== Marketing ===
Silent Hill: Townfall was first announced in a 2022 teaser trailer. On 12 February 2026, its first trailer was released during Sony's State of Play presentation. More information was revealed during a Silent Hill transmission that same day. During the 2 June 2026 State of Play, the release date was announced as 24 September 2026.

Two weeks before the game's release, a one-shot tie-in comic, Silent Hill: Townfall - The Dock House, also written by Jon McKellan and illustrated by David Roach, and published by 2000 AD was announced. It was made available in the UK on 16 September 2026, and was released in the US (and other overseas territories) on September 30. The comic was released both in print and digitally through 2000 AD's proprietary webstore and app.

=== Gameplay ===
Silent Hill: Townfall is the first major Silent Hill title to be presented from a fully first-person perspective, (Note: Silent Hill: The Arcade (2007) and Silent Hill: The Short Message (2024) featured first-person perspective. Silent Hill 4: The Room (2004) also featured first-person perspective when exploring Henry Townshend's apartment.) drawing comparisons to P.T., a demo for Hideo Kojima's cancelled Silent Hills project. It was always planned to be a first-person game as Screen Burn's previous games were also first-person and they were already comfortable with the perspective. Simon's handheld CRTV, one of the central mechanics in Townfall, necessitated the use of a first-person perspective due to the visual nature of its display. The player would be unable to see the handheld CRTV display in third-person without rendering it onto a UI element which McKellan commented would begin to "feel like a mini-map" that would feel "really out of place for Silent Hill".

=== Narrative ===
Silent Hill: Townfall is set in the Scottish coastal town of St. Amelia which was based on the real Scottish coastal village of St Monans in Fife. It is the third Silent Hill title to be set outside of the United States after 2024's Silent Hill: The Short Message was set in the fictional German city of Kettenstadt, and 2025's Silent Hill f went to 1960s Japan. Series producer Motoi Okamoto felt that "Silent Hill was becoming slightly repetitive" due to its use of similar locations as most titles were set in the United States. Okamoto explained that gameplay and locations became too similar between Silent Hill titles and Konami instead wanted to reinterpret "Silent Hill not as a physical location but as a phenomenon, a state of mind". Screen Burn were given the freedom to create their own kind of horror. Writer and director Jon McKellan said that the narrative was informed by real life references, including "things that have happened to me or members of the team". McKellan explained that there are "very specific reasons why" the game is set in 1996 such as it being "on the cusp of when technology started to explode in the home" such as the personal computer and the internet.

Like Silent Hill f, Silent Hill: Townfall contains five different endings with McKellan calling it a "wide linear" experience. McKellan said that subtle choices and actions contribute to the ending rather than a stark "A/B choice" that determines the ending. Two of the endings are accessed through New Game Plus.

=== Casting ===
On 25 August 2026, Silent Hill: Townfall's English voice cast was revealed with Jovan Adepo starring as Simon Ordell. Kezia Burrows stars as Zoe Ellis, a nurse who reaches out to Simon through the CRTV. Terry O'Quinn portrays Richard Shaw, described as an "enigmatic man who summons Simon back to St. Amelia".

== Reception ==
Reception

Aggregate scores
Aggregator	Score
Metacritic	(PC) 80/100 (PS5) 79/100
OpenCritic	79% recommend

Review scores
Publication	Score
Eurogamer	4/5
Game Informer	8.25/10
GameSpot	8/10
GamesRadar+	4.5/5
Hardcore Gamer	4.5/5
IGN	8/10
NME	5/5
PC Gamer (US)	89/100
PCGamesN	10/10
Push Square	7/10
Shacknews	8/10
The Guardian	4/5
Video Games Chronicle	3/5

Silent Hill: Townfall received "generally favorable" reviews, according to review aggregator website Metacritic, with fellow review aggregator OpenCritic reporting that 79% of critics recommended the game.

=== Awards ===
Year	Award	Category	Result	Ref.
2026	Golden Joystick Awards	Best Supporting Performer (Terry O'Quinn)	Nominated	
2026	Golden Joystick Awards	Best Storytelling	Nominated	
