= Anthony Howell (actor) =

English actor (born 1971)

- Born: Anthony Matthew Howell; 27 June 1971 (age 55); Lake District, England, UK
- Occupation: Actor
- Years active: 1999–present

Anthony Matthew Howell (born 27 June 1971) is an English actor, best known for his starring role as Sgt. Paul Milner in the British TV series Foyle's War and Margit/Morgott in Elden Ring.

== Early years ==
Howell was born in the Lake District. He trained to be an actor at the Drama Centre in North London. His acting debut came when he began a world tour with Robert Lepage's stage play The Geometry of Miracles.

== Career ==
He subsequently starred in the BBC four-part series Wives and Daughters (1999) before joining the 2000 Royal Shakespeare Company season in Stratford-Upon-Avon, where he took leading roles in the three main plays of that year: Orlando in As You Like It, Benvolio in Romeo and Juliet and Antipholous of Ephesus in The Comedy of Errors, playing opposite David Tennant.

After leaving the RSC in 2001 he filmed three TV series; Ultimate Force, Helen West and the first season of Foyle's War. He went on to spend more than ten years in Foyle's War, working alongside Michael Kitchen and Honeysuckle Weeks.

During the months he wasn't filming Foyle's War he returned to the theatre. In 2005 he starred in Agatha Christie's And Then There Were None in the West End of London. He played the lead in the first stage adaptation of John Fowles's The French Lieutenant's Woman which toured the UK in 2006. In 2008, Howell appeared in the Primavera production of Jingo: A Farce of War by Charles Wood at London's Finborough Theatre, then toured with the Peter Hall company in an adaptation of Henry James's Portrait of a Lady and Ibsen's A Doll's House.

In 2010 he played Gordon Way in the BBC TV adaptation of Dirk Gently, loosely based on the books by Douglas Adams. Later that year he joined Shakespeare's Globe to perform in Henry VIII, and also in the world premiere of Howard Brenton's Anne Boleyn, playing the role of a young Henry VIII opposite Miranda Raison as Anne, roles they both reprised at the Globe in the following year. Two years later he played Trigorin in a new adaptation of Chekhov's The Seagull by Evening Standard Award winning writer, Anya Reiss at the Southwark Playhouse.

He also played Jean Neuhaus, a Belgian chocolatier, in an episode in Season 2 of Mr Selfridge.

Howell filmed Dracula in Budapest, an NBC Universal series starring Jonathan Rhys Meyers. He also voices Victor Belmont in the 2014 video game Castlevania: Lords of Shadow 2, as well as providing the motion capture for the protagonist, Dracula. He also provided the voice and motion capture for Weyland-Yutani employee Christopher Samuels in the 2014 survival horror game, Alien: Isolation.

In the summer seasons of 2014 and 2015 he appeared on the stage of the Globe in London, in 2014 as Cassius in Shakespeare's Julius Caesar and in 2015 as Bishop Santa Cruz in Helen Edmundson's The Heresy of Love.

From 2016 to 2020 he was a station imaging voice over for BBC Three Counties Radio.

In 2017 he played Cliff in the horror film Widow's Walk.

In 2018 BBC Radio 4 aired a five-part drama, The Unforgiven. Set in 1984, this was a prequel to the BBC One television series Waking the Dead, which ran from 2000 to 2011. The Unforgiven was written by Barbara Machin, the creator of Waking the Dead, and features the original cast, the exception being Trevor Eve, who played Detective Superintendent Peter Boyd in the TV series, but was replaced by Howell for the radio series.

He played Palmer, the assassin contracted by George Cornelius (Patrick Malahyde) to kill DCI John Luther (Idris Elba) in the final two episodes of Luther (series 5) which aired in 2019.

== Theatre ==
Year	Title (playwright)	Role	Notes
1998	The Promise (Aleksei Arbuzov)	Marat	
1998	The Geometry of Miracles (Robert Lepage)	Wes Peters	Ex Machina Theatre Company, Quebec City
2000	Romeo and Juliet (William Shakespeare)	Benvolio	Royal Shakespeare Company
2000	The Comedy of Errors (William Shakespeare)	Antipholus of Ephesus	Royal Shakespeare Company
2002	As You Like It (William Shakespeare)	Orlando	Royal Shakespeare Company
2005	The Lifeblood (Glyn Maxwell)	Sir Thomas Gorge	Edinburgh Festival, Riverside Studios, London
2005–06	And Then There Were None (Agatha Christie)	Lombard	Gielgud Theatre, London
2007	The French Lieutenant's Woman (John Fowles)	Charles Smithson	adapted for the stage by Mark Healy, No. 1 Tour
2008	Jingo: A Farce of War (Charles Wood)	Ian	Finborough Theatre, London
2008	Portrait of a Lady (Henry James)	Ralph	stage play by Nicki Frei, paired with A Doll's House, Theatre Royal, Bath and touring
2008	A Doll's House (Henrik Ibsen)	Krogstad	paired with Portrait of a Lady, Theatre Royal, Bath and touring
2010	Henry VIII (William Shakespeare)	Duke of Buckingham	The Globe, London
2010–11	Anne Boleyn (Howard Brenton)	Henry VIII	The Globe, London London
2012	The Seagull (Anton Chekhov)	Trigorin	Southwark Playhouse London
2014	Julius Caesar (William Shakespeare)	Cassius	The Globe, London
2015	The Heresy of Love (Helen Edmundson)	Bishop Santa Cruz	The Globe, London

== Filmography ==
=== Television ===
Year	Title	Role	Notes
1999	Wives and Daughters	Roger Hamley	Main cast (miniseries)
2001	Helen West	Dinsdale Cotton	2 episodes
2001	Swallow	Dr. Max Stokes	3 episodes
2002	The Other Boleyn Girl	William Carey	TV movie
2002	Ultimate Force	Cpl. Sam Leonard	1 episode
2002–2010	Foyle's War	Paul Milner	Main cast (series 1–6)
2003	Hawking	Hamlet	TV movie
2010	Dirk Gently	Gordon Way	1 episode
2012	Dungeons & Dragons 3: The Book of Vile Darkness	Ranfin	
2013	Dracula	Stephen Laurent	3 episodes
2013	Mr Selfridge	Jean Neuhaus	1 episode
2013	Shetland	Peter Latimer	2 episodes
2015	Crossing Lines	Nigel St.Clair	1 episode
2015	You, Me and the Apocalypse	Father Christophe	3 episodes
2016	Medici: Masters of Florence	Francesco Sforza	2 episodes
2019	Luther	Palmer	2 episodes (series 5)
2024	Fool Me Once	Christopher Swain	2 episodes
2026	Grace	Fergus Doyle	1 episode

=== Video games ===
Year	Title	Role	Notes
2014	Castlevania: Lords of Shadow 2	Victor	Voice
2014	Alien: Isolation	Samuels	Voice
2014	Dragon Age: Inquisition	Gaspard de Chalons	Voice
2015	Grey Goo	Singleton	Voice
2015	Soma	Johan Ross	Voice
2017	Horizon: Zero Dawn	Behavas / Dervahl	Voice
2018	Vampyr	Jonathan Reid	Voice
2018	Thronebreaker: The Witcher Tales	Ardal aep Dahy / Eyck of Denesle / Eldain	Voice
2018	Call of Cthulhu	Edward Pierce	Voice
2018	World of Warcraft: Battle for Azeroth	Brother Therold	Voice
2019	Anthem	The Monitor	Voice
2019	Observation	S.A.M.	Voice
2019	Final Fantasy XIV: Shadowbringers	Fourchenault Leveilleur	Voice
2019	Arknights	Młynar	Voice
2020	Demon's Souls	Puppeteer / Yurt, the Silent Chief	Voice
2020	World of Warcraft: Shadowlands	Laurent	Voice
2021	Final Fantasy XIV: Endwalker	Fourchenault Leveilleur / Kairos	Voice
2022	Elden Ring	Margit / Morgott	Voice
2023	Diablo IV	Elias	Voice
2023	Final Fantasy XVI	Cyril	Voice
2023	Lies of P	Giuseppe Geppetto	Voice
2025	The First Berserker: Khazan	Blade Phantom	Voice
2025	Elden Ring Nightreign	Fell Omen	Voice
2026	007 First Light	Sir Nicholas Webb	Voice
2026	Onimusha: Way of the Sword	Shuten Doji	Voice
2026	The Blood of the Dawnwalker	Pieter	Voice
2026	Silent Hill: Townfall	Dr. Glenn	Voice

=== Film ===
Year	Title	Role	Notes
2015	Woman in Gold	Austrian Official	
2019	Widow's Walk	Cliff	

== Discography ==
Year	Title	Role	Author	Notes	Ref.
2011	Doctor Who - The Valley of Death	Edward Perskins	Philip Hinchcliffe	First published October 2011 by Big Finish Productions, part of The Fourth Doctor Box Set	
2012	Doctor Who - The Renaissance Man	Edward	Justin Richards	First published February 2012 by Big Finish Productions	
2012	The Liberator Chronicles Volume 1	Gustav Nyrron	Simon Guerrier, Nigel Fairs and Peter Anghelides	First published February 2012 by Big Finish Productions	
2012	Great Nature Poems	Narrator	Robert Browning, William Shakespeare, Gerard Manley Hopkins and others	First published 2 April 2012 by Audible	
2012	Doctor Who - The First Sontarans	Jacob	Andrew Smith	First published July 2012 by Big Finish Productions	
2012	The Liberator Chronicles Volume 2	Gustav Nyrron	Simon Guerrier, Eddie Robson and Nigel Fairs	First published August 2012 by Big Finish Productions	
2012	The Fall	Narrator	Claire McGowan	First published 21 September 2012 by Headline Digital	
2013	Doctor Who - The Lady of Mercia	Professor John Bleak	Paul Magrs	First published May 2013 by Big Finish Productions	
2014	The Avengers – The Lost Episodes: Volume 1	Dr. Keel	John Dorney	First published 31 January 2014 by Big Finish Productions	
2014	The Avengers – The Lost Episodes: Volume 2	Dr. Keel	John Dorney	First published 31 July 2014 by Big Finish Productions	
2015	The Avengers – The Lost Episodes: Volume 3	Dr. Keel	John Dorney	First published 31 January 2015 by Big Finish Productions	
2015	The Liberator Chronicles Volume 11	Gustav Nyrron	Nigel Fairs, Iain McLaughlin, Andrew Smith	First published March 2015 by Big Finish Productions	
2015	Jago & Litefoot Series 09	Victor Bataille	Jonathan Morris, Justin Richards, Simon Barnard, Paul Morris	First published April 2015 by Big Finish Productions	
2015	The Avengers – The Lost Episodes: Volume 4	Dr. Keel	John Dorney	First published 31 July 2015 by Big Finish Productions	
2015	The Sixth Doctor - The End of the Line	Tim Hope	Simon Barnard and Paul Morris	First published August 2015 by Big Finish Productions as part of The Sixth Doctor - The Last Adventure	
