= List of best-selling Wii video games =

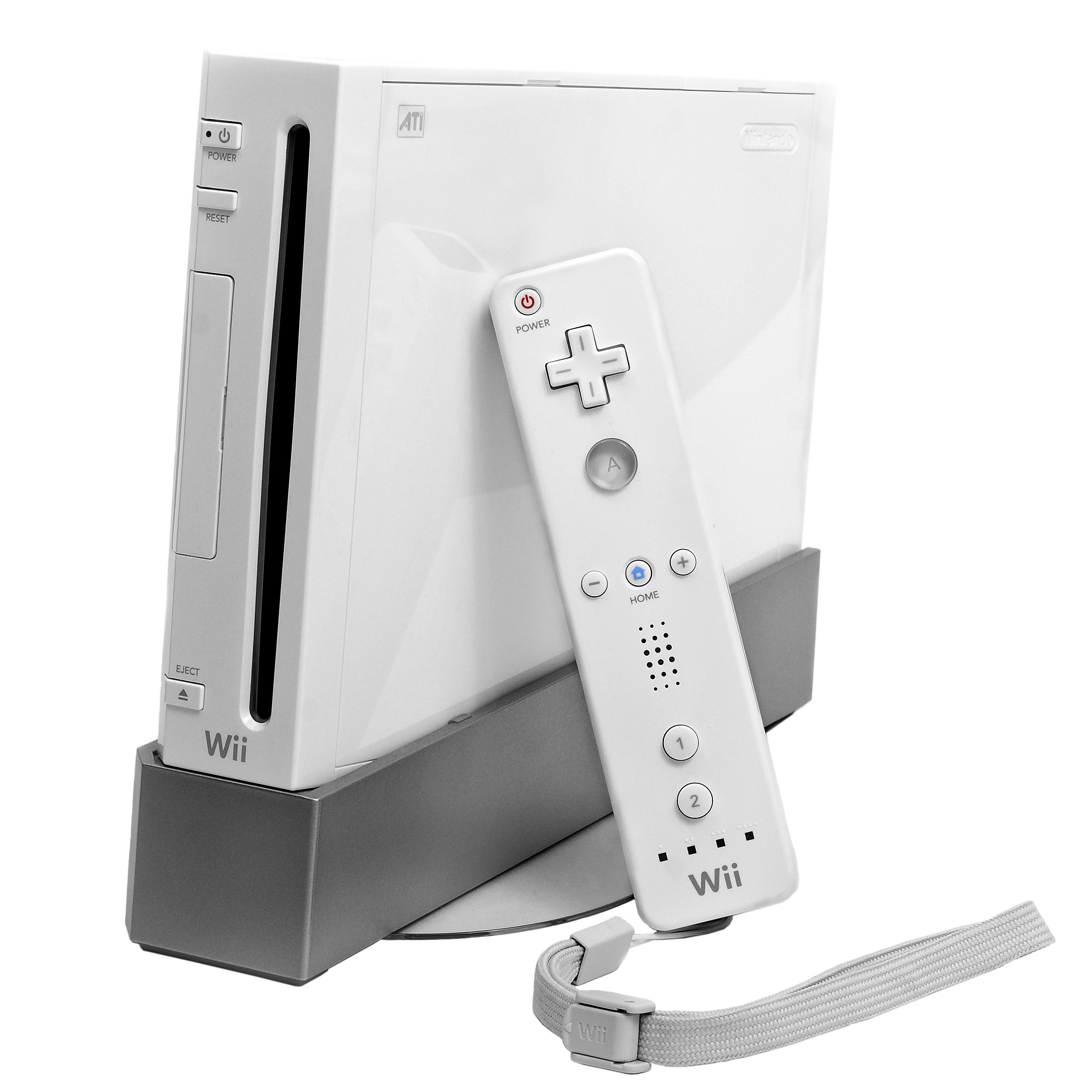
Wii console with Wii Remote

This is a list of video games for the Wii video game console that have sold or shipped at least one million copies. The best-selling game on the Wii is Wii Sports. First released in North America on November 19, 2006, it was a launch title for the system and was bundled with the Wii console in all regions except Japan and South Korea. The game went on to sell nearly 82.90 million units worldwide making it the Third-best-selling video game of all time and is also the best-selling game released on a single console. Mario Kart Wii is the second-best-selling game on the platform with sales of 37.38 million units. It is the second-best-selling iteration in the Mario Kart series behind Mario Kart 8 Deluxe. The third-best-selling game is Wii Sports Resort, a sequel to Wii Sports, with sales of 33.14 million units. The console's top five is rounded out by New Super Mario Bros. Wii, which sold 30.32 million units and Wii Play, which sold just over 28 million units worldwide.

There are a total of 64 Wii games on this list which are confirmed to have sold or shipped at least one million units. Of these, 21 were developed by internal Nintendo development divisions. Other developers with the most million-selling games include Ubisoft Paris with five games and Capcom and Sega Sports R&D, with three games each on the list. Of the 64 games on this list, 42 were published in one or more regions by Nintendo. Other publishers with multiple million-selling games include Ubisoft with six games and Activision and Capcom with three games each. The best selling franchises on the Wii include the Wii video game series (157.53 million combined units), Super Mario (53.77 million combined units), and The Legend of Zelda (16.96 million combined units).

By March 31, 2021, over 921.85 million total copies of games had been sold for the Wii. By December 31, 2007, sales of Virtual Console games had reached over 10 million copies. As of March 31, 2019, there are a total of 103 Wii games that have sold at least one million units.

== List ==
Key
†	Game was bundled with Wii consoles during its lifetime

Game	Copies sold	Release date (Note: Only the initial release date on this platform is listed.)	Genre(s)	Developer(s)	Publisher(s)
Wii Sports †	82.90 million	November 19, 2006	Sports	Nintendo EAD (Group 2)	Nintendo
Mario Kart Wii †	37.38 million (Note: Bundled with a popular accessory such as an additional Wii Remote, Wii MotionPlus, Wii Zapper, or Wii Wheel)	April 10, 2008	Racing	Nintendo EAD (Group 1)	Nintendo
Wii Sports Resort †	33.14 million	June 25, 2009	Sports	Nintendo EAD (Group 2)	Nintendo
New Super Mario Bros. Wii †	30.32 million	November 12, 2009	Platform	Nintendo EAD (Group 4)	Nintendo
Wii Play	28.02 million	December 2, 2006	Party	Nintendo EAD (Group 2)	Nintendo
Wii Fit	22.67 million	December 1, 2007	Exergaming	Nintendo EAD (Group 5)	Nintendo
Wii Fit Plus	21.13 million	October 1, 2009	Exergaming	Nintendo EAD (Group 5)	Nintendo
Super Smash Bros. Brawl	13.32 million	January 31, 2008	Fighting	Sora Ltd.; ad hoc development team; (Note: Development co-operation from Game Arts, Monolith Soft, Paon, Imageepoch, Intelligent Systems, and others)	Nintendo
Super Mario Galaxy	12.80 million	November 1, 2007	Platform	Nintendo EAD (Group 1)	Nintendo
Just Dance 3	9.92 million	October 7, 2011	Rhythm	Ubisoft Paris	Ubisoft
Wii Party †	9.35 million	July 8, 2010	Party	Nd Cube; Nintendo SPD (Group 4)	Nintendo
Mario Party 8	8.85 million	May 29, 2007	Party	Hudson Soft	Nintendo
The Legend of Zelda: Twilight Princess	7.50 million	November 19, 2006	Action-adventure	Nintendo EAD (Group 3)	Nintendo
Super Mario Galaxy 2	7.41 million	May 23, 2010	Platform	Nintendo EAD (Group 1)	Nintendo
Mario & Sonic at the Olympic Games	7.09 million	November 6, 2007	Sports	Sega Sports R&D	JP: Nintendo; NA/PAL: Sega
Donkey Kong Country Returns	6.53 million	November 21, 2010	Platform	Retro Studios	Nintendo
Mario & Sonic at the Olympic Winter Games	6.53 million	November 5, 2009	Sports	Sega Sports R&D	JP: Nintendo; NA/PAL: Sega
Link's Crossbow Training	5.79 million	November 19, 2007	Shooter	Nintendo EAD (Group 3)	Nintendo
Lego Star Wars: The Complete Saga	5.64 million	November 6, 2007	Action-adventure	Traveller's Tales	LucasArts
Just Dance 2	5 million	October 12, 2010	Rhythm	Ubisoft Paris	Ubisoft
Animal Crossing: City Folk	4.32 million	November 16, 2008	Life simulation	Nintendo EAD (Group 2)	Nintendo
Just Dance	4.3 million	November 17, 2009	Rhythm	Ubisoft Paris	Ubisoft
Super Paper Mario	4.23 million	April 9, 2007	Action role-playing: platform	Intelligent Systems	Nintendo
The Legend of Zelda: Skyward Sword	3.67 million	November 18, 2011	Action-adventure	Nintendo EAD (Group 3)	Nintendo
Big Brain Academy: Wii Degree	3.34 million	April 26, 2007	Puzzle: educational	Nintendo EAD (Group 4)	Nintendo
Mario Party 9	3.11 million	March 2, 2012	Party	Nd Cube	Nintendo
Wii Music	2.86 million	October 16, 2008	Music	Nintendo EAD (Group 2)	Nintendo
Mario Strikers Charged	2.6 million	May 25, 2007	Sports	Next Level Games	Nintendo
Mario & Sonic at the London 2012 Olympic Games	2.4 million	November 15, 2011	Sports	Sega Sports R&D	JP: Nintendo; NA/PAL: Sega
WarioWare: Smooth Moves	2.35 million	December 2, 2006	Party; Rhythm	Nintendo SPD (Group 1); Intelligent Systems	Nintendo
Mario Super Sluggers	2.32 million	June 19, 2008	Sports	Bandai Namco Games; Now Production	Nintendo
Super Mario All-Stars: 25th Anniversary Edition	2.24 million	October 21, 2010	Platform	Nintendo EAD	Nintendo
Guitar Hero III: Legends of Rock	2 million	October 28, 2007	Rhythm	Vicarious Visions	Activision
Michael Jackson: The Experience	2 million	November 23, 2010	Music; Rhythm	Ubisoft Paris	Ubisoft
Resident Evil 4: Wii Edition	2 million	May 31, 2007	Survival horror	Capcom	JP/NA/EU: Capcom; AU: Nintendo Australia
Deca Sports	2 million	April 16, 2009	Sports	Hudson Soft	JP/NA: Hudson Soft; EU: Konami
Epic Mickey	2 million	November 25, 2010	Platform	Junction Point Studios	Disney Interactive Studios: JP: Nintendo
Game Party	2 million	November 27, 2007	Party	FarSight Studios	Midway Games
Mario Sports Mix	1.98 million	November 25, 2010	Sports	Square Enix; Nintendo SPD (Group 4)	Nintendo
Pokémon Battle Revolution	1.95 million	December 14, 2006	Fighting	Genius Sonority	Nintendo
Kirby's Return to Dream Land	1.93 million	October 24, 2011	Platform	HAL Laboratory	Nintendo
Monster Hunter Tri	1.9 million	August 1, 2009	Action role-playing	Capcom Production Studio 1	Capcom
Kirby's Epic Yarn	1.85 million	October 14, 2010	Platform	Good-Feel; HAL Laboratory	Nintendo
EA Sports Active	1.8 million	May 19, 2009	Fitness	EA Canada	Electronic Arts
New Play Control! Mario Power Tennis	1.79 million	January 15, 2009	Sports	Camelot Software Planning	Nintendo
Wii Play: Motion	1.64 million	June 13, 2011	Party	Various (Note: Wii Play: Motion's twelve minigames were developed by several different developers alongside Nintendo: Arzest, Chunsoft, Good-Feel, Mitchell Corporation, NDcube, Nintendo, Prope, Skip Ltd., and Vanpool.)	Nintendo
Carnival Games	1.5 million	August 27, 2007	Party	Cat Daddy Games	Global Star Software
Metroid Prime 3: Corruption	1.41 million	August 27, 2007	First-person action-adventure	Retro Studios; Nintendo	Nintendo
Guitar Hero World Tour	1.33 million	October 26, 2008	Music; rhythm	Vicarious Visions	Activision
Resident Evil: The Umbrella Chronicles	1.3 million	November 13, 2007	Rail shooter	Capcom; Cavia	JP/NA/EU: Capcom; AU: Nintendo Australia
PokéPark Wii: Pikachu's Adventure	1.25 million	December 5, 2009	Action-adventure	Creatures Inc.	Nintendo; The Pokémon Company
Sonic and the Secret Rings	1.2 million	February 20, 2007	Platform	Sonic Team	Sega
Rayman Raving Rabbids	1.2 million	November 19, 2006	Party	Ubisoft Montpellier	Ubisoft
We Ski	1.2 million	January 31, 2008	Skiing	Bandai Namco Games	Bandai Namco Games
Big Beach Sports	1.2 million	June 24, 2008	Sports	HB Studios	THQ
Punch-Out!!	1.14 million	July 23, 2009	Sports	Next Level Games	Nintendo
Wario Land: Shake It!	1.06 million	July 24, 2008	Platform	Good-Feel	Nintendo
Active Life: Outdoor Challenge	1.03 million	May 29, 2008	Exergaming	h.a.n.d.	Bandai Namco Games
Call of Duty: World at War	>1 million	November 10, 2008	First-person shooter	Treyarch	Activision
Red Steel	1 million	November 19, 2006	First-person shooter	Ubisoft Paris	Ubisoft
Rock Band	1 million	June 22, 2008	Rhythm	Pi Studios	MTV Games
Zumba Fitness	1 million	November 18, 2010	Fitness	Pipeworks Software	Majesco; 505 Games
Super Mario Bros. 3 (Note: Virtual Console game)	1 million	November 5, 2007	Platform	Nintendo EAD	Nintendo
Game Party 2	1 million	October 6, 2008	Party	FarSight Studios	Midway Games

== See also ==
- List of best-selling Nintendo video games
