= Motoi Okamoto =

Japanese video game producer, programmer and writer

- Education: University of Tokyo
- Occupation: Game producer
- Years active: 1999–present
- Employers: Nintendo (1999–2008); Entersphere (2008–2017); DMM Games (2017–2019); Konami (2019–present)
- Known for: Silent Hill
- Website: LinkedIn

Motoi Okamoto is a Japanese video game producer, programmer and writer.

He joined Nintendo in April 1999. Initially, he provided library support on Luigi's Mansion (2001), subsequently assisting other projects like Pikmin (2001), Pikmin 2 (2004), The Legend of Zelda: The Wind Waker (2002), and Super Mario 64 DS (2004). In 2006 he directed Wii Play.

He left the company in May 2008 and founded Entersphere, an independent studio which developed Army Corps of Hell (2011) for the PlayStation Vita.

In June 2019 he joined Konami and was put in charge of the Silent Hill series. He subsequently served as series producer for Silent Hill: Ascension, director, producer, designer and writer for Silent Hill: The Short Message (2024), producer for Silent Hill 2 (remake), Silent Hill f, and Silent Hill: Townfall. He also worked on Return to Silent Hill alongside Akira Yamaoka as executive producers.

== Works ==
=== Video games ===
Year	Title	Role
2001	Luigi's Mansion	Library support
2001	Pikmin	Script
2002	Super Mario Sunshine	Library programmer
2002	The Legend of Zelda: The Wind Waker	Library programmer
2004	Pikmin 2	Script
2004	Super Mario 64 DS	Mini-game director, script
2006	New Super Mario Bros.	Mini-game director
2006	Wii Play	Director
2007	Wii Fit	Training director
2010	Evangelion: Bonds of a Fateful Encounter	Director, producer
2011	Army Corps of Hell	Director
2023	Silent Hill: Ascension	Series producer
2024	Silent Hill: The Short Message	Director, producer, designer, writer
2024	Silent Hill 2 (remake)	Producer
2025	Silent Hill f	Producer
2026	Silent Hill: Townfall	Producer

=== Filmography ===
Year	Title	Role
2026	Return to Silent Hill	Executive producer
