= Screen Burn (company) =

Scottish video game developer

Screen Burn Interactive Limited
- Formerly: No Code Limited (2015–2025)
- Industry: Video games
- Founded: August 19, 2015; 11 years ago
- Founders: Jon McKellan; Omar Khan
- Headquarters: Glasgow, Scotland
- Number of employees: 30 (2026)
- Website: screenburn.com

Screen Burn Interactive Limited (formerly No Code Limited) is a British video game developer based in Glasgow, Scotland. The company was founded on August 19, 2015, by Jon McKellan and Omar Khan. They are best known for creating Stories Untold (2017) and Observation (2019), as well as their partnership with Konami in developing the Silent Hill spin-off Silent Hill: Townfall (2026).

== History ==
No Code was founded on August 19, 2015, by Jon McKellan and Omar Khan. McKellan previously worked on titles such as Alien: Isolation and Red Dead Redemption 2. After spending time directing the Alien: Isolation DLC packs and getting a taste for working with smaller teams, Jon looked to form No Code and brought in long time friend Omar as a collaborator.

No Code's first order of business was porting the iOS game, Lub vs Dub, to Android platforms. The game was originally released under the name "Futuro", also the name of the band that Jon, Omar and designer (and Jon's brother) Graeme were in together. One year later, they created Super Arc Light for Android and iOS with publisher All 4 Games, a branch of UK TV Channel 4. Super Arc Light was nominated for two TIGA awards, as well as being Apple Store's "Editors Choice" on the week of release.

Later that year, No Code released a short game jam title called The House Abandon on itch.io, built originally for Ludum Dare 36 in a weekend, where it received positive reviews and became viral. According to McKellan, "Fast forward another 64 hours (after development started) and we submitted the final game with 15 seconds to spare before the cut off deadline." The same year, No Code received a deal with Devolver Digital, who then published Stories Untold - of which The House Abandon is the first chapter - which received very positive reviews.

Immediately after release of Stories Untold, work began on a sci-fi thriller title called Observation, again with Devolver Digital and partnered with PlayStation. In 2019, Observation was released to generally positive reviews from critics, and winning both the Best Game BAFTA in Scotland, as well as the Best British Game at the 2020 BAFTA Game Awards.

In 2020, No Code released the 'Console Edition' of Stories Untold for Xbox, PS4, and Switch - the first version of the game to be playable in multiple languages due to the keyboard-less text entry system.

After a few years of radio silence during the COVID-19 pandemic, in October 2022 it was announced that No Code were developing a Silent Hill game called Silent Hill: Townfall with the help of Konami Digital Entertainment and Annapurna Interactive.

In December 2024, original founder Omar Khan departed the company both as sound designer, and managing for personal reasons. Jon continued in a new capacity as creative and managing director going forward.

In July 2025, No Code rebranded to Screen Burn Interactive and confirmed the continuation of Silent Hill: Townfall's development.

In February 2026, Silent Hill: Townfall was finally revealed to the world in a Playstation "State of Play" Presentation and an accompanying "Silent Hill Transmission", showing the narrative setup of the game, introducing the team involved, and detailing the partnership between Konami and Annapurna Interactive, who joint-published the game. Townfall released on September 24th, 2026 to generally positive reviews.

== Games ==
Year	Title	Platform(s)	Publisher	Ref.
2015	Lub vs Dub	Android, IOS	Self-published	
2016	Super Arc Light	Android, IOS	Indie Champions, All 4 Games	
2016	House Abandon	macOS, Windows	Self-published	
2017	Stories Untold	macOS, Nintendo Switch, PlayStation 4, Windows, Xbox One	Devolver Digital	
2019	Observation	PlayStation 4, Windows, Xbox One	Devolver Digital	
2026	Silent Hill: Townfall	PlayStation 5, Windows	Konami Digital Entertainment, Annapurna Interactive	
