= Observation (video game) =

2019 video game

- Developer: No Code
- Publisher: Devolver Digital
- Director: Jon McKellan
- Designer: Graeme McKellan
- Programmer: Oliver Boyce
- Artist: Jon McKellan
- Writer: Jon McKellan
- Composers: Omar Khan; Robin Finck
- Engine: Unity
- Platforms: Windows; PlayStation 4; Xbox One
- Release: Windows, PlayStation 4; 21 May 2019; Xbox One; 25 June 2020
- Genres: Adventure; puzzle
- Mode: Single-player

Observation is an adventure video game developed by No Code and published by Devolver Digital. The game, described as sci-fi thriller, puts the player in control of a space station AI in order to recover from the sudden, mysterious loss of its crew. Observation was released for Windows and PlayStation 4 on 21 May 2019 and for Xbox One on 25 June 2020.

== Gameplay ==
Observation is an adventure game. The player takes the role of SAM (Systems Administration & Maintenance), an artificial intelligence software aboard a multi-national space station that serves to monitor the entire station. Initially, the player's view is limited to where the crew have relocated SAM, but as the game progresses, SAM can move its core presence between several of the modules on the station and manipulate cameras and other electronically controlled equipment in that module. Further on, SAM is provided one of several small spherical probes that allows it to move more freely through the station and into hostile environments harmful to the humans aboard, including outside of the station.

The player, by manipulating SAM, can control various elements of the station, such as opening or closing hatches, activating safety systems and the like. SAM may be instructed by the crew to perform specific tasks, and SAM can reply by finding the task element of interest (such as the status of a station module) and report back to the crew.

== Plot ==
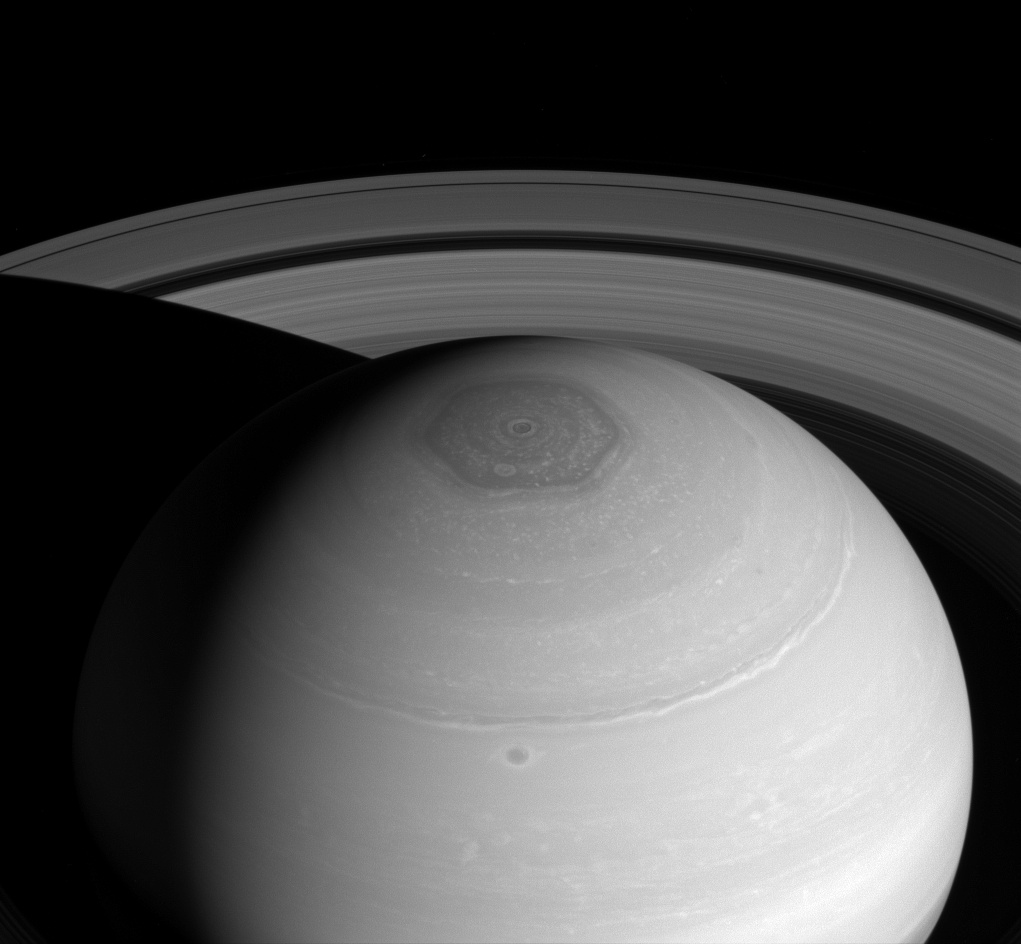
Much of the game centers around the hexagonal cloud pattern that has been observed on Saturn.

In the year 2026, the multi-national space station Observation orbits above Earth. An unknown event cripples Observation, leaving it without power. Dr. Emma Fisher, the station's medical officer, attempts to make contact with Houston and the five other crew members, but fails. Fisher reboots SAM, the station's integrated AI that controls Observation's systems and functions.

SAM receives a mysterious transmission that contains coordinates to an unknown location. Observation begins to tremor violently, knocking Emma out. Meanwhile, SAM receives instructions to "BRING HER". SAM's functionality returns with Emma's assistance before a fire alarm suddenly goes off. After extinguishing the fire, Emma discovers an unidentified, dark red, oil-like substance. Shortly after, another alarm goes off due to a dislodged module. Emma ejects it and orders SAM to assess external damage, and she is horrified to see that they are now in orbit over Saturn. Emma asks SAM to check the black box to figure out why, which reveals that SAM is the cause, but doesn't know how or why. SAM again receives interference from an unknown entity and deactivates.

Emma reboots SAM, who has been speaking gibberish. They access other parts of the station, finding the bodies of the other crew, including Jim, the mission commander. However, they find Mae to still be alive in a sealed module. They attempt to retrieve Mae with a spacewalk, but a Hexagonal cloud pattern on Saturn leaves Mae stranded. Emma finds a man-made object near Saturn's orbit. Emma initially believes it to be a rescue team, but instead discovers that it is an exact duplicate of Observation and its crew. A strange hexagonal object then appears to both SAM and Emma and communicates to them in a geographic glyph language before disappearing.

They board the second station, which has lost nearly all power due to a malfunction of the station's experimental Fusion Reactor. They find a still-living version of Jim, and learn that the crew experienced the same events that brought them to Saturn. As SAM goes to try to restore basic life support, he interacts with this station's SAM, and learns that, 4 years prior to the events of the game, 23 pairs of stars were discovered in which both stars within each pair had identical light curves. When lines were drawn to connect the pairs of stars, the lines intersected at an event marker close to Earth's position. In addition, when the 23 light curve graphs were layered upon each other, the combined graph was found to contain a perfect description of the 23 chromosome pairs of the human genome. Jim reveals that the entire Observation station had been constructed solely to reach the event marker so the crew could observe what would happen, with Jim having been the only crew member aware of the mission.

Continuing on, SAM encounters another crew member, Josh, who has been hiding from Jim, as Jim has also killed his doppelgänger. Before Josh can reveal more, Jim grabs SAM and Emma, and makes them jump back to Emma's Observation. Jim locks Emma out of the station, claiming that "It wants her", leaving her on little life support. As she clings to life, several other identical Observation stations appear to start gathering around the storm.

Jim proceeds to lock SAM out of the controls while he sends a desperate message for help to Earth, becoming frustrated at their seemingly greater interest in Emma and SAM’s status instead of his own promised return to Earth. SAM manages to find several back doors into the station's systems, interacts with the signal to Earth and warns them about the situation. Earth cuts off Jim, who now knows SAM is to blame. As Jim tries to attack SAM's core, the core suddenly explodes into a large amount of dark red oil that infests the entire station. SAM is then ordered by the Hexagonal entity to kill Jim, and does so by locking him in a module that he then depressurizes.

SAM then hears Emma calling, and allows her to enter through the airlock. Emma has clearly been changed by her experience and now speaks in an eerily calm tone. She tells SAM she now knows that they need to get to the storm on Saturn, and has SAM adjust their orbit and jettison the rest of the station. They fall into the storm and black out.

When Emma wakes, they find themselves on a rocky landscape, with debris and various bodies of Emma from multiple copies of Observation around them. They approach a giant version of the hexagonal entity again and make contact. Emma tells a confused SAM that there must have been multiple realities all converging on this point, and they were the first version of Emma and SAM to make it through the ordeal. They disappear briefly into the hexagonal entity.

When they wake up, Emma and SAM find their consciousness has merged, allowing them to share a single body, and they are back on Earth by some means. They feel odd but alive, and by touching the ground, they are able to infect it with the dark red oil the same way the entity did to Observation. The combined Emma/SAM persona is then instructed to "BRING THEM".

== Development ==
=== Conception ===
Observation was developed by No Code, a Scottish game studio who had previously released Stories Untold in 2017. Game director and No Code co-founder Jon McKellan had previously worked at Creative Assembly, where he was the lead user interface designer on Alien: Isolation. McKellan was partially inspired by an article published shortly after Alien: Isolation's release. The article talked about how watching the 1979 Alien film from the perspective of the Alien made the creature more sympathetic to viewers, as the Alien was merely trying to survive being hunted by people. This got McKellan thinking about the idea of deconstructing horror film tropes by imagining them from a different point of view. Separately, he also wanted to write a story where the player's actions could impact the story's events.

McKellan ultimately founded No Code in 2015 with the intention of developing and releasing Observation. No Code initially began work on a demo version of Observation in early 2016, showing it to game publishers in hopes of getting a contract with them. While the team was successful in attracting a publisher, the process of creating and signing the publishing contracts took a long time. During this downtime, No Code participated in the Ludum Dare game jam, creating The House Abandon. This led to the development team creating an anthology of games built off of The House Abandon, released as Stories Untold. According to McKellan, Stories Untold served as a "road test" for Observation, as the development team got the chance to develop mechanics and learn from mistakes heading into the development of Observation.

=== Production ===
After spending years on pre-production and prototype creation, No Code took roughly 25 months to develop the game, using the Unity game engine along with other tools like Autodesk 3ds Max and Substance. Many people who worked on Observation had previously worked on Alien: Isolation — in addition to McKellan, character artists Jack Perry and Ranulf Busby, concept artist Stefano Tsai, and voice actors Kezia Burrows and Anthony Howell had worked on the latter game. While the team members had experience in AAA development, No Code had a limited budget, which forced the team to come up with unique solutions to save money without compromising quality. To simulate the lack of gravity in space during motion-capture acting sessions, the team pushed an animator around on a bar stool. No Code's philosophy was to save on development costs by only paying special attention to things the player would notice. For things like dialogue between characters in cutscenes, the development team opted to do things like move them behind closed doors out of sight from the player, so that the conversations did not have to be animated. It was this philosophy that caused No Code to invest a lot of time in pre-production, creating a lot of modular environments that could be repurposed throughout the game.

One of the fundamental topics that No Code wanted to explore in Observation was how a machine that had become self-aware might feel, and how humans might react to it. By putting the player in SAM's shoes, McKellan realized that SAM's feelings would mirror the player's, as both would be experiencing things in a different way. To give the player a sense of "[feeling] like an alien entity of some sort", No Code iterated on developing interactions that relied on a machine's understanding of how to perform a task. For example, instead of pressing a physical button on their controller to open a door in-game, players — as SAM — had to establish a connection with another system first.

According to McKellan, Observation was initially split into separate sections, but merged into a full-length game when the story's size made it difficult for it to be split into distinct episodes.

A few months before the game released, the developers engaged in focus tests to determine problem areas where the testers felt frustrated or lost.

Observation was announced on 8 October 2018, with a release time frame of spring 2019 for PC and PlayStation 4. No Code and Devolver Digital had a previous working relationship from the release of Stories Untold. In March 2019, it was announced that the game would be released on 21 May 2019. Devolver Digital later stated on 25 March 2019 that Observation would be sold on PC exclusively on the Epic Games Store for one year. It released on Steam on 21 May 2020. Devolver Digital also brought the game to Xbox One on 25 June 2020.

== Reception ==
Reception

Aggregate score
Aggregator	Score
Metacritic	PC: 79/100; PS4: 75/100

Review scores
Publication	Score
Destructoid	9/10
Eurogamer	Recommended
Game Informer	9/10
GameSpot	8/10
HobbyConsolas	80/100
IGN	9/10
PC Gamer (US)	82/100
Push Square	8/10
The Guardian	4/5
USgamer	2.5/5
VideoGamer.com	8/10

Observation received "generally favorable" reviews from critics, according to review aggregator website Metacritic. Destructoid called the game "expertly paced" but also complained of occasional hiccups when some of the puzzles became "a point-and-click-adventure-style wild goose chase." GameSpot praised the games visuals, saying "Observation absolutely nails its distinct lo-fi, sci-fi aesthetic," and concluding that it "is a wonderful example of how to do focused, self-contained science-fiction storytelling in a game." Several outlets praised the game's storytelling and plot, which was described as "gripping" by Game Informer and IGN, with PC Gamer stating "[it] kept me hooked from beginning to end". It made the Top 20 games of 2019 list for The Guardian.

=== Awards ===
Year	Award	Category	Result	Ref.
2019	British Academy Scotland Awards	Best Game	Won	
2019	The Independent Game Developers' Association Awards	Best Audio Design	Nominated	
2019	The Independent Game Developers' Association Awards	Creativity Award	Won	
2019	The Independent Game Developers' Association Awards	Best Visual Design	Nominated	
2019	Golden Joystick Awards	Best Storytelling	Nominated	
2019	Golden Joystick Awards	Best Indie Game	Nominated	
2019	Golden Joystick Awards	Best Audio	Nominated	
2020	MCV/Develop Awards	Narrative Innovation of the Year	Nominated	
2020	Independent Games Festival Awards	Excellence in Audio	Nominated	
2020	16th British Academy Games Awards	British Game	Won	
