= Super Mario 64 DS =

2004 video game

- North American box art, depicting (from left to right) Wario, Mario, Yoshi, and Luigi
- Developer: Nintendo EAD
- Publisher: Nintendo
- Director: Shinichi Ikematsu
- Producer: Shigeru Miyamoto
- Designer: Makoto Miyanaga
- Programmers: Toshihiko Nakago; Toshio Iwawaki
- Artists: Michiho Hayashi; Kenji Shinmoto
- Writer: Motoi Okamoto
- Composer: Kenta Nagata
- Series: Super Mario
- Platform: Nintendo DS
- Release: NA: November 21, 2004; JP: December 2, 2004; AU: February 24, 2005; EU: March 11, 2005
- Genres: Platform, action-adventure
- Modes: Single-player, multiplayer

Super Mario 64 DS (Note: Japanese: スーパーマリオ64DS, Hepburn: Sūpā Mario Rokujūyon Dī Esu) is a 2004 platform video game developed and published by Nintendo for the Nintendo DS. It is an enhanced remake of Super Mario 64, released in 1996 for the Nintendo 64. As with the original, the game's plot centers on rescuing Princess Peach from Bowser. Players start the game with Yoshi as the playable character and gain access to Mario, Luigi, and Wario as the story progresses.

Nintendo Entertainment Analysis and Development, who also developed the original, first displayed the game as a multiplayer demonstration at the 2004 E3 titled Super Mario 64 ×4. In addition to updated graphics, the remake includes additional characters, a multiplayer mode, and minigames. Super Mario 64 DS was a launch title for the Nintendo DS, released in the United States and Japan in 2004; it was released in PAL regions the following year.

The game has won awards and received generally positive reviews from critics, who praised its single-player mode, graphics, and the changes from the original game. The multiplayer mode and lack of analog controls from the original were common areas of complaints among reviewers. The game is the tenth best-selling Nintendo DS game, with over 11.06 million copies sold by 2018. Super Mario 64 DS was re-released on the Wii U's Virtual Console service across 2015 and 2016.

== Gameplay ==
Gameplay takes place in a 3D environment with the game's original view point displayed on the top screen while an overhead map indicating relevant locations is on the bottom screen. The Power Flower item augments the characters' abilities; shown is Yoshi breathing fire after collecting the item.

Super Mario 64 DS is a 3D platformer based on the original Super Mario 64 for the Nintendo 64 and features several changes from the source game, such as new characters, courses, Power Stars, and items. During the course of the game, the player controls four characters—Yoshi, Mario, Luigi, and Wario—navigating them through 3D courses. While the four characters have similar move sets, each character has special maneuvers unique to them. Power Stars are scattered throughout the courses; while there are 150 stars in the game, not all are required to complete the game. Each course is an enclosed world in which the player is free to wander and discover the environment without a time limit. The worlds are inhabited with hostile enemies, as well as friendly creatures that provide assistance or ask for help. The castle has been expanded to include new courses, like the Sunshine Isles; new enemies inhabit courses as well, like the Goomboss.

The game uses both the system's screens during gameplay. The top screen displays the main interactions, while the bottom touchscreen functions as an overhead map and allows touch controls. The overhead map displays the current course the player traverses and displays item locations. The touch controls include virtual buttons, which rotate the top screen's camera angle, and directional character controls, which can operate with either the DS stylus or the player's thumb using the DS wrist strap. In addition to the single-player adventure, the game includes 36 minigames and a multiplayer mode. Minigames are made accessible by catching rabbits in the main game. The minigames use the touchscreen to play and are based on different themes; for example, racing, card games, puzzles, and action. The multiplayer mode uses the wireless DS Download Play where up to four players compete against each other.

Power-ups in Super Mario 64 DS take the form of special caps resembling those worn by Mario, Luigi, and Wario. Acquiring a cap will change the player's character into the corresponding character, allowing them to use that character's abilities. The hats fall off if the character is hit but can be reacquired. Yoshi is able to start a level wearing the hat of any of the other available characters. The "Power Flower" item provides the characters unique abilities: Mario inflates like a balloon and is able to float; Luigi becomes intangible and transparent, similar to the Vanish Cap in the Nintendo 64 version; Wario becomes coated by metal, which makes him temporarily invincible and sink underwater, similar to the Metal Cap in the original version; and Yoshi is able to breathe fire, which allows him to burn enemies and melt ice.

== Plot ==
Super Mario 64 DS is set in Princess Peach's Castle. The game begins with Mario receiving a letter from Princess Peach inviting him to her castle for a cake she has baked for him. Mario arrives at Peach's castle, along with Luigi and Wario. The trio disappear after entering the castle, and Lakitu, the game's camera operator, wakes Yoshi up to inform them of their disappearance. Yoshi explores the castle to find Mario, Luigi, Wario, and Peach.

Scattered throughout the castle are paintings and secret walls, which act as portals to other worlds where Bowser and his minions guard the Power Stars. After recovering some power stars and defeating Bowser's minions, Yoshi unlocks other areas of the castle, where he finds Mario and his friends imprisoned in various rooms. They tackle obstacle courses, with each ensuing a battle with Bowser. After defeating him each time, they receive a key that opens more of the castle. Upon reaching the highest area of the castle, Mario confronts Bowser. After Bowser's defeat, Mario and his friends return to the castle entrance, where they free Peach. As a reward, Peach kisses Mario on the nose and takes the four to bake a cake.

== Development ==
Due to more polygons in the 3D models, Super Mario 64 DS (left) features more detailed character models than the Nintendo 64 version (right). Shown is Mario engaged in a boss battle against Bowser.

Super Mario 64 DS was published by Nintendo and developed by Nintendo Entertainment Analysis and Development (EAD), the company's internal software development division, for the Nintendo DS. It is a remake of the Nintendo 64 launch game Super Mario 64 with updated graphics. Graphical changes include character models with more polygons and the absence of texture filtering.

Shigeru Miyamoto, long time general manager of EAD, produced the game and oversaw the development. Miyamoto would meet with the game's team late in the night after completing his company administrative duties. The planning meetings would last a few hours, after which the designers would immediately create design documents for Nintendo artists and programmers. Because the Nintendo DS hardware lacked an analog stick, Miyamoto sought to improve the original game in order to compensate for what he considered an incomplete 3D Mario experience. Extra stages and characters were added to achieve this ethos. Additionally, Yoshi's hover ability was included to relax the difficulty of jumping in a 3D environment.

Among the team was Motoi Okamoto, who oversaw the minigames. In designing touchscreen-based games, Okamoto played many Flash games as part of his research of point-and-click games. Through experimentation, Okamoto concluded that increasing the number of similar objects in some games tested the player's cognitive abilities; he developed the "Wanted", "Which Wiggler?", "Boom Box", and "Intense Coincentration" minigames based on this. To provide the player with a good variety, he aimed to balance the types of minigames, such as casino games, action games, puzzle games, and cognitive games.

== Marketing and release ==
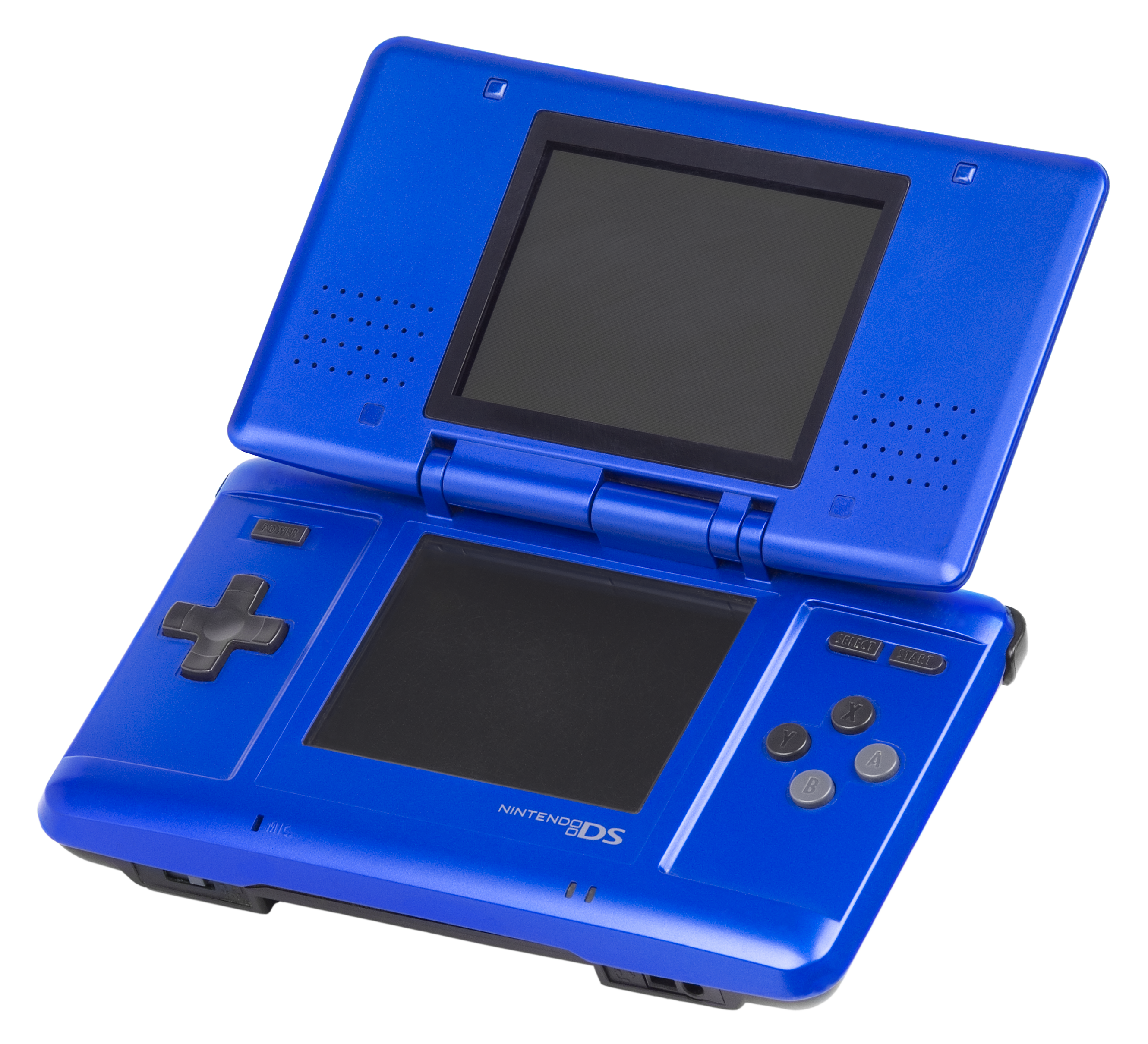
Super Mario 64 DS was a launch title for the Nintendo DS (pictured) and was shown alongside the handheld console at the 2004 E3.

The game was first unveiled during Nintendo's E3 press conference showcasing the Nintendo DS on May 11, 2004. The next day, the company had a multiplayer demonstration, titled "Super Mario 64 ×4", on the showroom floor for E3 attendees to play. The short demo featured the four player characters competitively seeking power stars. A few months later, Nintendo announced an actual game—along with many others—was in development.

At the Nintendo DS conference on October 7, 2004, the game was on demonstration again and new information was revealed; the name was changed to Super Mario 64 DS and the four different characters would be used in the main, single-player adventure. The demonstration was a more complete version than the one on display at E3—the game's development was 90% complete at this time—and highlighted the multiple characters in the single-player mode and included minigames; the multiplayer mode, however, was not present. In November 2004, Nintendo held an event, Nintendo World Touch! DS, across five cities in Japan to promote the upcoming release of the handheld system and games. Stations with demonstrations of Super Mario 64 DS were available to play.

Prior to the October conference, the appearance of the box art on GameStop's product page caused speculation Super Mario 64 DS would be a launch game. Nintendo confirmed the rumor by announcing at the conference that the game would be a launch game of the Nintendo DS in North America and Japan. As the game's release approached, the release schedule of launch games altered; many games were delayed, while others were announced to be released a few days before the Nintendo DS. Super Mario 64 DS was the only game scheduled to be released with the system. Nintendo continued to advertise the game after launch as part of the handheld console's "Touching is good" campaign, which was created by advertising firm Leo Burnett Worldwide. Advertisements included 30-second TV commercials that featured Super Mario 64 DS, among other titles, as well as print and online materials.

At the beginning of 2005, Nintendo announced plans for the game to also be a launch title in Australia and the United Kingdom on February 24, 2005 and March 11, 2005, respectively. The inclusion of the casino minigames resulted in regional differences when Nintendo exported the game. The South Korean Game Rating and Administration Committee required that the gambling-related minigames be removed in order for the game to be rated for all ages (ALL). While the Pan-European Game Information organization originally rated Super Mario 64 DS suitable for all age groups (PEGI 3), the rating board deemed a re-release unsuitable for players under 12 (PEGI 12) due to "infrequent teaching of gambling".

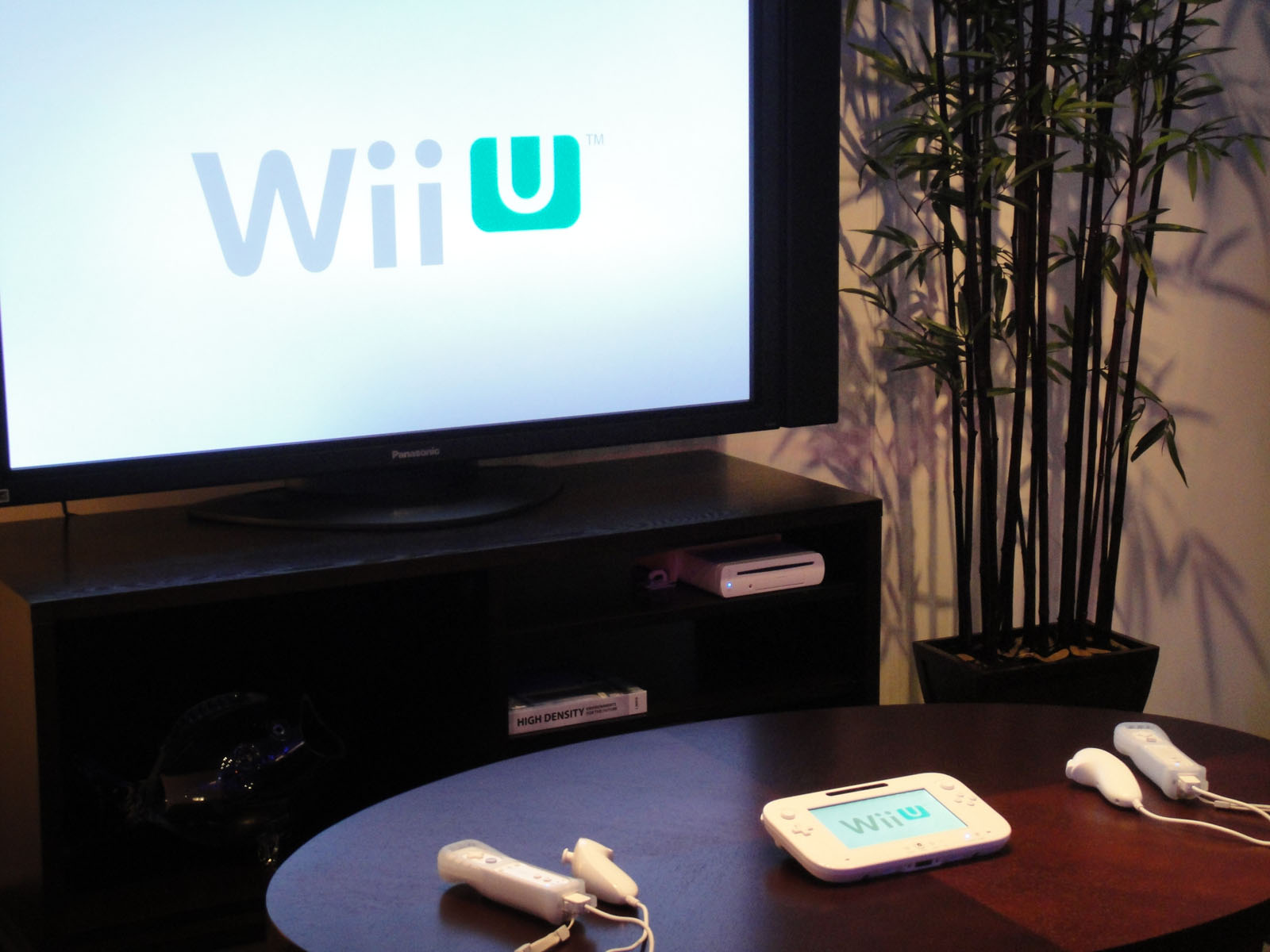
The game was re-released on the Wii U console, which has a GamePad that provides a second screen with touchscreen controls, similar to the Nintendo DS.

Nintendo announced plans to bundle the game with the handheld console in June 2005 only in the United States; after speculation of a similar plan in the United Kingdom, the company clarified that it had no such plans at the time. Despite this, retailers HMV and Game in the United Kingdom began offering the game in their own Nintendo DS bundles. On June 5, 2011, the game, along other Mario DS titles, was repackaged in a red-colored case in tandem with a price drop of $99 for the DS. Super Mario 64 DS was later re-released in Europe for the Wii U as a part of the Virtual Console line of games on December 24, 2015. Japanese and North American re-releases followed on January 6, 2016, and August 25, 2016, respectively.

== Reception ==
=== Sales ===
Super Mario 64 DS has been commercially successful. After launching, the game debuted on NPD Group's best-selling console titles list for November 2004 at number ten. It remained at that spot by January 2005. A few months later, NPD Group reported that the game's sales ranked it the seventh top portable game during June 2005. Dengeki staff reported that Super Mario 64 DS was a popular title at several game stores in Tokyo, Japan during the first day of the console launch. Following its Japanese release, the game sold 241,000 copies by December 19, 2004, and was the fifth best-selling game on the weekly sales chart of that week. Sales continued to increase, and Super Mario 64 DS had sold 639,000 units by February 20, 2005. At the end of May 2005, Super Mario 64 DS was the second highest-selling DS game on the Entertainment and Leisure Software Publishers Association's United Kingdom chart tracking. The game reached the top spot on the chart in June before falling back to number two in July.

In the United States, it sold 1.4 million copies and earned $42 million by August 2006. During the period between January 2000 and August 2006, it was the seventh highest-selling game launched for a handheld console. By November 2006, the game had sold over one million units in Europe, and by the end of 2007, over two million copies in the United States. By May 31, 2011, the game had sold 4.34 million copies in the United States, and in October 2012, Nintendo reported that the game had surpassed sales of 5 million units, the third title on the system to reach that mark. As of March 31, 2018, Super Mario 64 DS has sold 11.06 million copies worldwide.

=== Critical response ===
Reception

Aggregate score
Aggregator	Score
Metacritic	85/100

Review scores
Publication	Score
1Up.com	B
Edge	8/10
GamePro	17.5/20
GameSpot	8.4/10
GameSpy	5/5
Hyper	85/100
IGN	8.9/10
Play	3.5/4

Awards
Publication	Award
Interactive Achievement Awards	Wireless Game of the Year (2004)
GameSpy	Best of Nintendo DS (2004)
Golden Joystick Awards	Best Handheld Game (2005)
IGN	Game of the Month (November 2004)

Prior to the game's release, Craig Harris of IGN reviewed the early demonstration. He commented on the accurate recreation of the graphics and stated that the Nintendo DS's small screen helps hide visual flaws. Harris criticized the game's controls, calling them a little "sluggish" and "clumsy". Though he praised the graphics and new gameplay additions, Harris expressed disappointment that the Mario launch game for the new system was a remake instead of a full game. IGN's Anoop Gantayat anticipated the game would be a big hit among American video game enthusiasts. In Japan, Famitsu ranked Super Mario 64 DS the 29th most wanted game.

Super Mario 64 DS has won awards and met with "generally favorable reviews" from video game journalists, according to review aggregator website Metacritic, on which the game holds a weighted average score of 85 out of 100 based on 54 reviews and which listed it as the best Nintendo DS game of the year and 34th best Nintendo DS game of all time. Upon its release, IGN staff labeled it as an "Editor's Choice" and awarded it "Game of the Month" for the Nintendo DS, citing the game as a "great achievement" of the system's capability. GameSpy staff named it the "Best of Nintendo DS" in their 2004 Game of Year awards, citing the portability of the classic game along with the improvements. Super Mario 64 DS won a Golden Joystick Award for best handheld game of 2005. During the 8th Annual Interactive Achievement Awards, the Academy of Interactive Arts & Sciences awarded Super Mario 64 DS with "Wireless Game of the Year", as well as received a nomination for "Handheld Game of the Year".

Reviewers praised the game's accurate recreation of the Nintendo 64 game. Harris said the original feel of Super Mario 64 is retained, while the new challenges and features build upon it in a way that added to the game's longevity. A GamePro writer under the alias Bro Buzz acknowledged the differences of the remake but stated that the "essential elements are there". Phil Theobald of GameSpy commented that the original's gameplay holds up ten years after its release. A reviewer for Edge magazine commended Nintendo for taking on the challenge of retooling Super Mario 64 onto hardware so different from the Nintendo 64. They considered the remake a success despite wanting a new experience to better showcase the Nintendo DS. Similarly, Play magazine's Michael Hobbs praised having a portable version of the Nintendo 64 classic but questioned why Nintendo didn't release a brand new Mario game for the system. Edge staff reiterated the assessment in 2006, stating that the game poorly demonstrated the handheld console's full capabilities. Conversely, Harris considered it a good demonstration of the Nintendo DS's capabilities.

The changes and new content received a mixed response. Jeff Gerstmann of GameSpot complimented the updated graphics, specifically the higher polygon count and smooth frame rate. He called Super Mario 64 DS a "great update of a classic game" and felt the changes and additional features offered a new experience to fans of the original. Theobald complimented the minigames, use of a second screen, and extra stars. Writing for Hyper, March Stephnik believed the new characters were integrated well into the game and considered the minigames a good showcase of the system's abilities. Hobbs also praised the character integration, writing that it added "freshness to the classic gameplay". In contrast, 1UP.com's Jeremy Parish felt the game did not offer enough new content to warrant purchasing. He praised the inclusion of extra characters, calling them a "nice twist", but concluded his review by calling the game a "poorly-conceived port" that should be played on the original system. The Edge reviewer decried the new visual style, describing it as a "caricature" of kids' TV shows. However, they stated that the gameplay changes "ranged from harmless bonuses to genuine improvements."

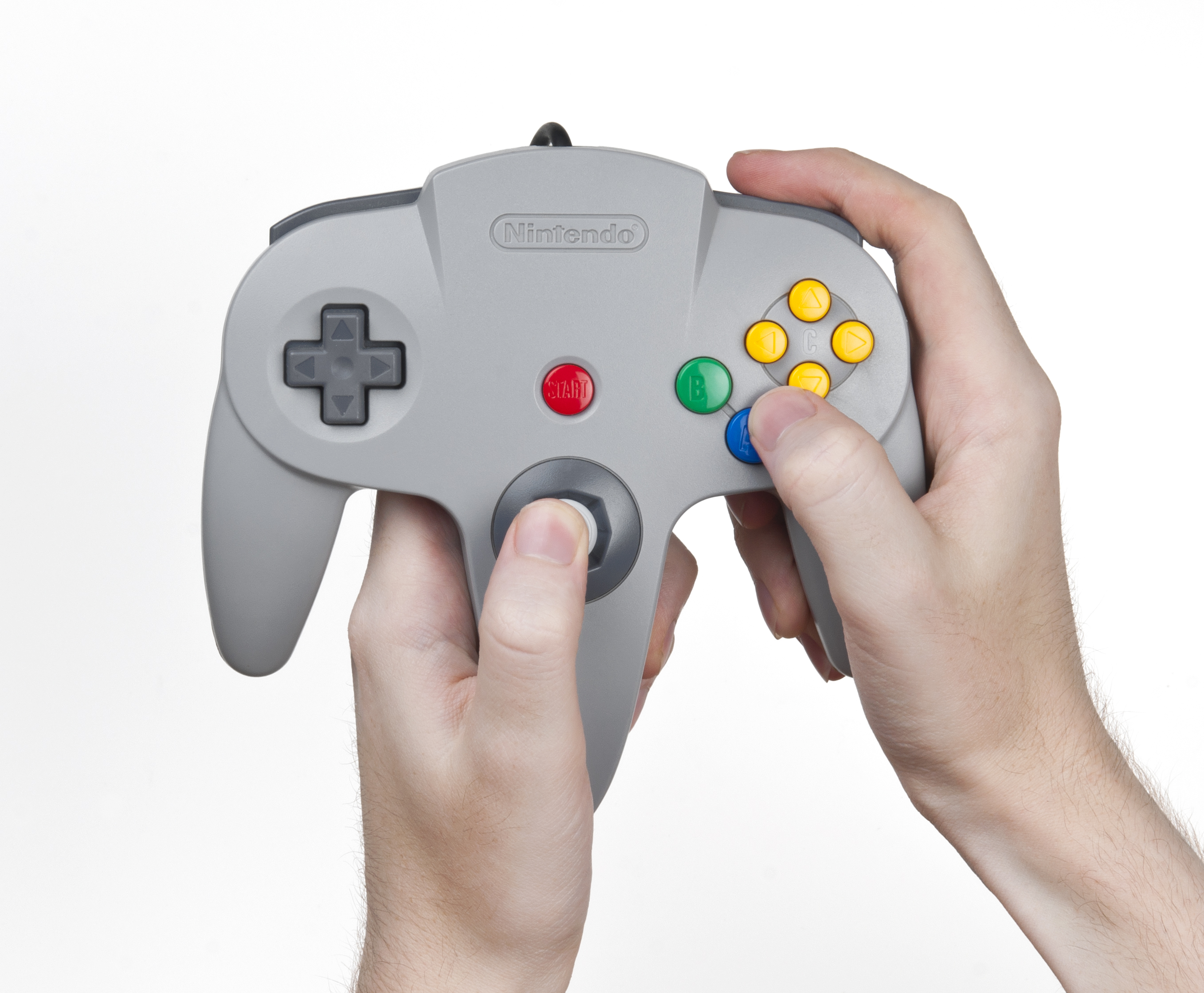
The lack of an analog control stick, which the original game had with the Nintendo 64 controller (pictured), was a common complaint in reviews.

Criticism focused on the game's controls and multiplayer mode. Theobald felt the lack of an analog stick made the controls more difficult than the original game and required a short period of adjustment. He further stated that the digital pad and touchscreen's virtual analog control were "tricky" and required practice. Harris and Stephnik echoed similar comments. Harris further noted the touchscreen does not provide physical feedback like an analog stick and the original was never intended to be played without analog controls. While Retro Gamer staff considered Super Mario 64 DS a success, they believed its controls played a large role in keeping it from reaching similar heights as the original. Gerstmann referred to the multiplayer mode as "uneventful" and felt it lacked longevity. He nonetheless commented that it was a good extra that demonstrated the system's wireless multiplayer capabilities. Theobald agreed it was a nice addition but considered it a "diversion" that players would tire of quickly.

== Legacy ==
Elements from Super Mario 64 DS have influenced later Nintendo products. When releasing additional songs for Daigasso! Band Brothers in 2005, the company included a song from Super Mario 64 DS along with others from Nintendo franchises. The next Super Mario game for the Nintendo DS, New Super Mario Bros., also included a collection of mini-games, many of which first appeared in Super Mario 64 DS. Okamoto would later design games for the 2006 Wii Play and repurposed the "Wanted" minigame design into the "Find Mii" game. While lamenting the lack of proper analog controls for the game, Trone Dowd of Inverse noted that Nintendo eventually added an analog stick to the later iterations of the DS line.

Fans have created content related to Super Mario 64 DS. Soon after its release in Australia, a fan created digitally altered images that depicted Waluigi as a hidden character in the game. Inspired by the pervasive rumor that Luigi was an unlockable character in the original, he posted the images online as an April Fools' Day joke. Homebrew enthusiasts created a software mod that allows the Super Mario 64 DS to be played with analog controllers via a video game console emulator.

== See also ==
- GoldenEye 007 – 2010 Nintendo DS remake of Nintendo 64 game
- Star Fox 64 3D – 2011 Nintendo 3DS remake of Nintendo 64 game
- The Legend of Zelda: Ocarina of Time 3D – 2011 Nintendo 3DS remake of Nintendo 64 game
- The Legend of Zelda: Majora's Mask 3D – 2015 Nintendo 3DS remake of Nintendo 64 game
