= Army Corps of Hell =

2011 action-strategy game

- European cover art
- Developer: Entersphere
- Publisher: Square Enix
- Director: Motoi Okamoto
- Platform: PlayStation Vita
- Release: JP: December 17, 2011; WW: February 22, 2012
- Genres: Action, strategy
- Mode: Single-player

Army Corps of Hell (Japanese: 地獄の軍団, Hepburn: Jigoku no Gundan) is an action-strategy video game developed by Entersphere and published by Square Enix for the PlayStation Vita.

== Development ==
Army Corps of Hell was developed by Entersphere, which was founded by Nintendo alumni Motoi Okamoto. Okamoto noted that the development of the game felt fresh due to his experience being limited to Nintendo hardware. This was Entersphere's first console game after a number of mobile games for the Gree platform. To promote the game, Square Enix released short live-action comedic vignettes on YouTube.

== Reception ==
Reception

Aggregate score
Aggregator	Score
Metacritic	57/100

Review scores
Publication	Score
Destructoid	7/10
Game Informer	4.50/10
GameSpot	6.5/10
IGN	7/10
X-Play	2.5/5

The game received "received "mixed or average" reviews, according to Metacritic. Tom McShea of GameSpot gave it a rating of 6.5/10, saying "Army Corps of Hell captures the devilish combat of its setting but is too repetitive to sustain that appeal."
