= Silent Hill: The Short Message =

2024 video game

- Developers: Konami Digital Entertainment; HexaDrive
- Publisher: Konami Digital Entertainment
- Director: Motoi Okamoto
- Producer: Motoi Okamoto
- Designer: Motoi Okamoto
- Programmer: Yuya Yamaguchi
- Artist: Chihiro Tanaka
- Writers: Kiichi Kanoh; Motoi Okamoto
- Composer: Akira Yamaoka
- Series: Silent Hill
- Engine: Unreal Engine 5
- Platform: PlayStation 5
- Release: January 31, 2024
- Genre: Psychological horror
- Mode: Single-player

Silent Hill: The Short Message (Note: Japanese: サイレントヒル: ザ ショートメッセージ, Hepburn: Sairento Hiru: Za Shōtomessēji) is a 2024 psychological horror game co-developed by Konami Digital Entertainment and HexaDrive, and published by Konami Digital Entertainment for PlayStation 5. The game was announced and released for free on January 31, 2024, becoming available for PlayStation Plus members. It follows a teenage girl Anita Planert, who receives bizarre text messages from a friend who died by suicide, and must look for clues in an abandoned apartment complex in Germany, where a monster covered in cherry blossoms pursues her.

Silent Hill: The Short Message is played from a first-person perspective and features no combat, with the protagonist being forced to flee from enemies. Bullying, the impacts of social media, and suicide are the primary themes of the game. It received mixed reviews; some praised its visuals, atmosphere, themes, and free release, but others criticized its gameplay, dialogue, and repetitive chase sequences.

== Plot ==
In the economically depressed German town of Kettenstadt, a young woman named Anita receives a text message from her friend and online celebrity Maya, a graffiti artist known as "C. B." Maya requests to meet in the Villa, an abandoned apartment complex and popular graffiti site that is infamous as a suicide hotspot for teenage girls. Anita follows a trail of Maya's artworks throughout the Villa, beset by flashbacks regarding the online harassment she experienced while trying to be as popular as Maya. As she moves through the building, she is stalked by a large humanoid monster covered in blooming cherry blossoms. (Note: Unnamed in the game but later revealed to be called Sakura Head)

Unable to make contact with Maya, Anita receives a call from her friend Amelie, who reminds Anita that Maya died some time ago after jumping off the roof of the Villa. Anita is shocked that she would forget something so important and wonders who is messaging her as Maya. She winds up on the roof and discovers Maya's final artwork. Jealous of Maya's popularity, she steps off the roof in an attempt to emulate Maya's suicide, but wakes up back in the Villa. Noticing that the Villa is now dilapidated and vandalized, she receives another message from Maya stating that neither of them can leave until Anita finds "it", but is not told what "it" is. Forced to explore the Villa again, she relives memories of Maya being bullied at school, then finds an artwork of Maya's that she has never seen before; it depicts Amelie, causing Anita to recall how Maya always seemed much closer to Amelie than her and that she felt ignored by Maya.

Continuing on, Anita appears to arrive in her school library, where she learns about how Kettenstadt was supposedly cursed by a Japanese witch who was killed. She finds a letter written by Maya begging Amelie for help, and recalls that she purposely withheld the letter from Amelie due to her jealousy over Maya's close friendship with Amelie, which she believes led to Maya's suicide. She returns to the roof, calls Amelie to admit her guilt over Maya's death, and jumps off the roof for a second time. Again, she awakens back in the Villa.

Exploring the building once again, Anita finds herself in her childhood home, and recalls how her mother neglected and abused her and her younger brother by locking them in the closet. This culminated in Anita's brother dying while locked up and her mother attempting to hide his body in the refrigerator before Anita escaped and reported her to the police. Anita discovers that Maya was planning to make an artwork depicting her as well, confirming that Maya had not been ignoring her as she believed. The monster chases Anita for a final time before she finds herself back on the roof, where she apologizes to Amelie for not realizing how much Amelie and Maya valued her as a friend. She considers jumping off the roof for a third time but stops herself at the last second, causing the fog surrounding the Villa to disappear and returning Anita to reality.

Some time later, a social media post by Amelie indicates that she and Anita have left Kettenstadt to start new lives at college.

== Development ==
Motoi Okamoto, producer for the Silent Hill series, stated the game's main themes are suicide, cyberbullying, social media, and mental health. Creature designer and Silent Hill veteran Masahiro Ito continued, "I felt that, definitely, this was something that would really resonate with a younger generation, given that so many of them are active on social media."

=== Leaks ===
In 2022, screenshots from the game were leaked under the title Sakura. Silent Hill: The Short Message was rated in South Korea in September 2022 and in Taiwan in December 2022. In October 2022, Konami began hiring for upcoming Silent Hill projects, including an unannounced in-house game.

== Reception ==
Reception

Aggregate scores
Aggregator	Score
Metacritic	52/100
OpenCritic	31% recommend

Review scores
Publication	Score
Eurogamer	3/5
GameSpot	3/10
GamesRadar+	3/5
Hardcore Gamer	2/5
Push Square	4/10

Silent Hill: The Short Message received "mixed or average" reviews from critics, according to review aggregator website Metacritic, with 31% of critics recommending the game on aggregator OpenCritic.

Christopher Teuton from Screen Rant wrote in his review: "For a free game that shows the first glimpse of what Konami is truly going to do with the franchise, Silent Hill: The Short Message is absolutely worth experiencing". "It's a far better start than it could have been, and it is undeniably the best new Silent Hill media since 2014, although the game's effectiveness in handling these topics will vary depending on a person's own relationship with them."

Writing for IGN, Koji Fukuyama and Daniel Robson commended the game's "effective use of themes... to create a feeling of genuine dread", describing the game as a modern and impactful iteration of the Silent Hill franchise. In contrast, Mark Delaney of GameSpot described the game as a "bad Silent Hill caricature", critiquing its "trial-and-error" chase sequences and "on-the-nose" plot and dialogue. Willa Rowe of Kotaku found the game to be "unnecessarily graphic" and its themes "shallow and heavy-handed", observing the game's ending twist to be predictable. In a review for Polygon, Carli Velocci compared many aspects of the game to previous Silent Hill titles such as P.T. and Silent Hill: Downpour, and found the references to the series at large "extremely unsubtle", while describing the game's presentation of its suicide themes as "borderline tacky", observing that the writing "doesn't give Anita much more definition beyond her mental illness." Still, she ultimately concluded that the game has its merits, such as "some unique imagery that makes me feel optimistic about the series' future".

The game had reached over 4 million downloads on the PlayStation Store by May 23, 2025.
