= Stories Untold (video game) =

2017 video game

- Cover art, designed by Kyle Lambert
- Developer: No Code
- Publisher: Devolver Digital
- Director: Jon McKellan
- Producer: Omar Khan
- Designers: Jon McKellan, Graeme McKellan
- Programmers: Geoff Angus; Graeme McKellan
- Artist: Jon McKellan
- Writer: Jon McKellan
- Composer: Omar Khan
- Engine: Unity
- Platforms: macOS, Windows, Nintendo Switch, PlayStation 4, Xbox One
- Release: Windows, macOS; 27 February 2017; Nintendo Switch; 16 January 2020; PlayStation 4, Xbox One; 27 October 2020
- Genres: Adventure, puzzle
- Mode: Single-player

Stories Untold is an adventure game developed by No Code and published by Devolver Digital. Written and directed by Jon McKellan, the game was released on 27 February 2017 for macOS and Windows, for the Nintendo Switch in January 2020 and for PlayStation 4 and Xbox One in October 2020. It is a mix of adventure game genres, including text-based adventure, first-person exploration, and puzzle solving, and is themed after technology from the 1980s.

The game consists of four episodes, each of them an adventure and horror game. The first is a remastered version of The House Abandon, a shorter adventure game released as free-to-play in August 2016.

== Gameplay and plot ==
The story takes place in England, 1986. The first three episodes are ostensibly standalone games. In the first episode, the player has no name or even specified gender, in the second, he's referred to as "Mr. Aition", and in the third, "James". It's revealed in the concluding fourth episode that the games are actually all connected in a single story revolving around one player character, James Aition. Most of the game involves interacting with fictional computers, either in a single viewpoint, or with the ability to switch between two viewpoints; the third and fourth episodes also involve small segments of first person exploration.

=== The House Abandon ===
The unknown player-character plays the eponymous text-based adventure game, The House Abandon. In-game, the protagonist drives up to his family's holiday home, which he recalls fondly. A note in the glove compartment from his father helps him start the power. The player enters and explores the building, finding his old (and fictional) "Futuro 128k +2" computer, with the same copy of The House Abandon.

When the protagonist starts the game, a power outage occurs. When The House Abandon restarts, the environment is different; The eyes are scratched out in photos on the desk, and the digital clock is reset. This time, the house described in the game is in a terrible state with broken windows, stains, a carcass, and a terrible stench, surfacing undesirable memories and feelings in the protagonist. The note keeps changing every time the protagonist reads it, with progressively more horrifying messages as well as becoming physically uncomfortable.

Once the player inside the game opens the door of the house, it becomes apparent that actions inside the text adventure are mirrored in "real-life", as sounds of the player in the game can be heard around the house, and events in the room occur and respond to the environment described in the computer game; the game eventually struggles to distinguish the player sitting and playing, and the player walking around the house.

The protagonist becomes aware of another person in the house. They come upstairs, full of anger, disturbed thoughts, and suggestions of vague but horrible past events. They open the bedroom door and eventually enter, standing behind the player-character: the protagonist himself. The episode ends when the computer game forces the seated player-character to repeatedly admit, "It was all my fault". It then slowly responds: "finally".

=== The Lab Conduct ===
The player-character, Mr. Aition, is seated in a laboratory room. Dr. Daniel Alexander is remotely directing a series of experiments on "artifact 23", recovered at a crash site and now sitting in a chamber among the laboratory machines. Mr. Aition conducts experiments at his request using the machinery and using another computer to consult a manual for help. The artifact appears to be an animal heart, which Aition exposes to lasers to restart its beating, before causing it to explode through sound waves. Alexander directs Aition to drill into it, which blows out the lights, drill and monitor. During these experiments, the player can hear Alexander and his assistant talking about him.

Despite severe warnings, Alexander directs Aition to open the chamber to "make contact" with it; a small metallic sphere floats gently out, casting light into Aition's eyes. The sphere seemingly connects with the player, knocking him over, drawing blood, and perhaps doing something the player Aition could not see. Alexander states that the player is now a "proxy", with a connection to the entity's inner core. The sphere communicates its memories through another text adventure game to help Alexander discover what happened to it.

The game details the character waking up after having crashed onto a planet. Escaping the hazardous capsule, an "army" of people are standing, visible only as silhouettes. One silhouette approaches the player. The story then jumps to the character lying on a bed with wires attached to his chest, after being tortured. They pull out the wires, setting off an alarm in-game mirroring the environment: the laboratory.

A "specimen" leaves its room, where Dr. Alexander realizes the game is actually happening now and begs Aition to stop. He continues, moving the character to the adjacent room, where the character broadcasts something across the network. Alexander implores Aition not to rebel, but Aition continues by playing a minigame with unknown symbols replacing the game.

The game ends when the sphere breaks contact, and other similar spheres appear. Alexander declares, "They're all free. They're converging. It's over." He asks Aition not to do anything he'll regret. However, the game ends when Alexander says that someday, his experience will haunt him.

=== The Station Process ===
James, the player-character, is seated at a desk in an arctic "monitoring station" in Greenland. On the desk are a two-way radio, a computer, and a microfiche reader (referred in-game as "microfilm"). There are several other nearby stations, who communicate to James and each other, but he can only complete his tasks as the microphone is broken. The game is a series of puzzles, using the radio and microfilm reader to determine codes for various radio frequencies.

Meanwhile, the communication towers warn James not to go outside for any reason. Something falls onto the roof of James' station, but it is unknown. Another station is ripped out of the ground by an unseen attacker. One of the other stations sees "it" above their station, as well as James himself, stating, "They're here."

James is then ordered to realign the transmitter outside, moved by the wind, at which point James is knocked over and dragged outside. He gets up, walks a distance and fixes the transmitter. While he is walking back, miscellaneous objects appear in the environment, as the other stations command James to "wake up", and "tell them what happened". The station itself also seems to be connected to a vine, stretching into the sky. The interior is the computer desk from The House Abandon.

=== The Last Session ===
This episode begins with the game's opening sequence, thereafter paused as the camera pulls back to reveal it is playing on a television. Dr. Alexander takes the player, James Aition, to an empty room for a session that's being recorded on a cassette recorder: he is recovering from a 2-week coma following an accident, according to Alexander, and the session is aimed at recovering his memories of the events surrounding the accident. In the previous three sessions, James had merged his memories with fantasy, all terminated early due to panic.

The sphere from The Lab Conduct appears and transports him to the arctic station. The microfilm now displays the police report: James was in a car crash with his sister, Jennifer, trapped and critically injured. The other driver, Charles Hennings, a retired police officer, was killed, smelling of alcohol with an empty bottle found in the passenger seat. After completing a puzzle, a friend of Hennings, through a message, claims he never talked about alcohol and accuses Aition of irresponsibility. The game switches then to the laboratory, where the interactions with the machine mirror a life-saving operation on himself in the emergency room, where he arrived with no pulse. Following the ER doctor's orders, he restarts his heart, relieving a hemorrhage by drilling into his head.

He wakes at the computer desk to play The House Abandon, now detailing the events prior to and during the crash. At the house, full of people due to a New Years' party, James, who is set to leave on a long trip, finds a gift bottle of whiskey from his father, and gets drunk on it. He is then asked by an unsuspecting Jennifer to drive her home. James has a premonition of her covered in blood with the Futuro projecting her bloodied face in a body bag, before having another premonition showing his mother at the hospital being told that Jennifer is dead, but that James is alive, but her mother saying she does not want to see him. On the road, Jennifer realizes that James is drunk, but cannot convince him to pull over, and they crash into oncoming traffic. Afraid of going to jail and ruining his reputation, he pours some of the whiskey he received from his father onto Hennings and places the bottle in Hennings' car. Police officers arrive, as he approaches the silhouette of one.

The sphere then transports him back to the hospital, with the voice of Jen berating him on his behavior and actions, saying that he has to admit his guilt. Walking back into the room, James pushes "stop" on the tape recorder, per Alexander's orders. Alexander says he'll pass on the information to the police, and James then returns to watching Stories Untold on television.

== Development and release ==
Stories Untold was originally started as the single first episode The House Abandon in 2016, as an entry to Ludum Dare 36; writer-director and artist Jon McKellan drew on his experience creating Alien: Isolation when creating the game's aesthetic. The game's poster and logo was created by Stranger Things artist Kyle Lambert.

A version for the Nintendo Switch was released on 16 January 2020 in the west and on 23 January 2020 in Japan. The versions for PlayStation 4 and Xbox One were released on 27 October 2020.

=== Reception ===
Reception

Aggregate score
| Aggregator | Score |
|---|---|
| Metacritic | 81/100 |

Review scores
| Publication | Score |
|---|---|
| Adventure Gamers | 3/5 |
| GameSpot | 7/10 |
| PC Gamer (US) | 80/100 |
| Hardcore Gamer | 4/5 |
| The Daily Telegraph | 5/5 |

Edit on Wikidata

The game received generally positive reviews, holding a score of 81 on review aggregator Metacritic. Eurogamer ranked the game 48th on their list of the "Top 50 Games of 2017".
