= List of Mario puzzle games =

This is a list of puzzle games within the Mario franchise.

== Dr. Mario series ==
Game	Details
Dr. Mario Original release date(s): JP: July 27, 1990; NA: October 14, 1990; PAL: April 30, 1991	Release years by system: 1990 - NES, Nintendo VS. System, PlayChoice-10, Game Boy, Game Boy Advance
Tetris & Dr. Mario Original release date(s): NA: December 1994; PAL: 25 July 1995	Release years by system: 1994 - SNES
Tetris & Dr. Mario Original release date(s): NA: December 1994; PAL: 25 July 1995	Notes: Also includes an exclusive Mixed Match.
Dr. Mario 64 Original release date(s): NA: April 8, 2001; CHN: November 17, 2003	Release years by system: 2001 - Nintendo 64; 2003 - iQue Player
Dr. Mario Online Rx Original release date(s): JP: March 25, 2008; PAL: May 20, 2008; NA: May 26, 2008	Release years by system: 2008 - WiiWare
Dr. Mario Express Original release date(s): JP: December 24, 2008; NA: April 20, 2009; PAL: May 1, 2009	Release years by system: 2008 - Nintendo DSi (DSiWare)
Dr. Luigi Original release date(s): NA: December 31, 2013; JP: January 15, 2014; PAL: January 15, 2014	Release years by system: 2013 - Wii U
Dr. Mario: Miracle Cure Original release date(s): JP: May 31, 2015; NA: June 11, 2015; PAL: June 11, 2015	Release years by system: 2015 - Nintendo 3DS
Dr. Mario World Original release date(s): WW: July 9, 2019	Release years by system: 2019 - Android, iOS

== Mario's Picross series ==
Game	Details
Mario's Picross Original release date(s): JP: March 14, 1995; NA: March 16, 1995; AU: July 25, 1995; EU: July 27, 1995	Release years by system: 1995 - Game Boy; 2011 - 3DS Virtual Console
Mario's Super Picross Original release date(s): JP: September 14, 1995; PAL: September 14, 2007	Release years by system: 1995 - Super Famicom; 2007 - Virtual Console
Picross 2 Original release date(s): JP: October 19, 1996	Release years by system: 1996 - Game Boy; 2012 - Virtual Console

== Mario vs. Donkey Kong series ==
Game	Details
Mario vs. Donkey Kong Original release date(s): NA: May 24, 2004; AU: June 4, 2004; JP: June 10, 2004; EU: November 19, 2004	Release years by system: 2004 – Game Boy Advance 2024 – Nintendo Switch
Mario vs. Donkey Kong Original release date(s): NA: May 24, 2004; AU: June 4, 2004; JP: June 10, 2004; EU: November 19, 2004	Notes: The game was developed by Nintendo Software Technology.; It is a spiritual successor to the Game Boy version of Donkey Kong, which was a hybrid of the arcade game Donkey Kong, Donkey Kong Jr., and Super Mario Bros. 2.
Mario vs. Donkey Kong 2: March of the Minis Original release date(s): NA: September 25, 2006; AU: January 18, 2007; EU: March 9, 2007; JP: April 12, 2007	Release years by system: 2006 – Nintendo DS
Mario vs. Donkey Kong 2: March of the Minis Original release date(s): NA: September 25, 2006; AU: January 18, 2007; EU: March 9, 2007; JP: April 12, 2007	Notes: Nintendo developed the title.; The game is a sequel to Mario vs. Donkey Kong for the Game Boy Advance.; It expanded on the previous game by using touch screen controls.
Mario vs. Donkey Kong: Minis March Again! Original release date(s): NA: June 8, 2009; PAL: August 21, 2009; JP: October 7, 2009	Release years by system: 2009 – DSiWare
Mario vs. Donkey Kong: Minis March Again! Original release date(s): NA: June 8, 2009; PAL: August 21, 2009; JP: October 7, 2009	Notes: Nintendo developed the title.; The game was released exclusively through DSiWare download.; The gameplay is similar to that of Mario vs. Donkey Kong 2: March of the Minis.
Mario vs. Donkey Kong: Mini-Land Mayhem! Original release date(s): NA: November 14, 2010; JP: December 2, 2010; PAL: February 4, 2011	Release years by system: 2010 – Nintendo DS
Mario vs. Donkey Kong: Mini-Land Mayhem! Original release date(s): NA: November 14, 2010; JP: December 2, 2010; PAL: February 4, 2011	Notes: Nintendo developed the title.
Mario and Donkey Kong: Minis on the Move Original release date(s): NA: May 9, 2013; PAL: May 9, 2013; JP: July 24, 2013	Release years by system: 2013 – Nintendo eShop
Mario and Donkey Kong: Minis on the Move Original release date(s): NA: May 9, 2013; PAL: May 9, 2013; JP: July 24, 2013	Notes: Nintendo developed the title.; The game was released exclusively through Nintendo eShop download.
Mario vs. Donkey Kong: Tipping Stars Original release date(s): NA: March 5, 2015; JAP: March 19, 2015; EU: March 20, 2015; AU: March 21, 2015	Release years by system: 2015 – Nintendo 3DS eShop
Mini Mario & Friends: Amiibo Challenge Original release date(s): JP: January 28, 2016; NA: April 28, 2016; EU: April 28, 2016; AU: April 29, 2016	Release years by system: 2016 - Nintendo 3DS eShop

== Others ==
Game	Details
Wrecking Crew Original release date(s): JP: June 18, 1985; NA: October 18, 1985; PAL: October 15, 1987	Release years by system: 1985 - NES/Famicom; 1989 - Famicom Disk System; 2004 - Game Boy Advance; 2011 - Virtual Console
Alleyway Original release date(s): JP: April 21, 1989; NA: August 11, 1989; PAL: September 28, 1990	Release years by system: 1989 - Game Boy
Yoshi Original release date(s): JP: December 14, 1991; NA: June 1, 1992; PAL: December 10, 1992	Release years by system: 1991 - NES/Famicom, Game Boy
Yoshi's Cookie Original release date(s): JP: November 21, 1992; NA: April 1993; PAL: 1993	Release years by system: 1992 - NES, SFC/SNES, Game Boy, Virtual Console
Mario & Wario Original release date(s): JP: August 27, 1993	Release years by system: 1993 - Super Famicom
Hotel Mario Original release date(s): NA: April 5, 1994; PAL: 1994	Release years by system: 1994 - Philips CD-i
Wario's Woods Original release date(s): JP: February 19, 1994; NA: December 10, 1994; PAL: 1995	Release years by system: 1994 - NES, Super NES (Satellaview), GameCube (Animal Crossing)
Tetris Attack Original release date(s): JP: October 27, 1995; NA: August 1996; PAL: November 28, 1996	Release years by system: 1995 - Super NES; 1996 - Game Boy
Tetris Attack Original release date(s): JP: October 27, 1995; NA: August 1996; PAL: November 28, 1996	Notes: Unrelated to Tetris.; Original Japanese title: Panel de Pon; in Western collections and re-releases it was renamed Puzzle League.; The Game Boy port has Super Game Boy support.
Wrecking Crew '98 Original release date(s): JP: May 23, 1998	Release years by system: 1998 - Super Famicom
Mario no Photopi Original release date(s): JP: December 2, 1998	Release years by system: 1998 - Nintendo 64
Captain Toad: Treasure Tracker Original release date(s): JP: November 13, 2014; NA: December 5, 2014; EU: January 2, 2015; AU: January 3, 2015	Release years by system: 2014 - Wii U 2018 - Nintendo 3DS, Nintendo Switch
