= Mario (franchise) =

Multimedia franchise by Nintendo

- The emblem on Mario's hat is an iconic symbol of the Mario franchise.
- Created by: Shigeru Miyamoto
- Original work: Mario Bros. (1983) (Note: Although Mario first appeared in Donkey Kong (1981), Mario Bros. was the first game to feature the Mario branding.)
- Owner: Nintendo
- Years: 1983–present

Print publications
- Novel: Nintendo Gamebooks
- Comics: Various: Nintendo Comics System (1990–91); Super Mario-Kun (1990–present); Super Mario Adventures (1992–93)

Films and television
- Film: Various: Super Mario Bros. (1993); The Super Mario Bros. Movie (2023); The Super Mario Galaxy Movie (2026)
- Animated series: Various: The Super Mario Bros. Super Show (1989); The Adventures of Super Mario Bros. 3 (1990); Super Mario World (1991)
- Direct-to-video: Super Mario Bros.: The Great Mission to Rescue Princess Peach! (1986)

Games
- Traditional: Electromechanical games list
- Video games: Various: Super Mario series; Luigi series; Yoshi series; Wario series; Donkey Kong series; Paper Mario series; Mario & Luigi series; Mario Kart series; Mario Party series; Mario sports games; Mario puzzle games; Mario role-playing games; Mario educational games

Audio
- Original music: Music list

Miscellaneous
- Toy: Lego Super Mario
- Theme park attraction: Super Nintendo World
- Related franchise(s): Donkey Kong

Official website
- mario.nintendo.com

Mario (Note: Japanese: マリオ, Hepburn: Mario) is a media franchise of Japanese origin created by game designer Shigeru Miyamoto for the video game company Nintendo. Starring the character Mario, the franchise primarily consists of video games and has expanded to include other forms of media, including television series, comic books, live-action and animated feature films, and the theme park area Super Nintendo World. Mario made his first video game appearance in the arcade game Donkey Kong (1981) and was featured in multiple Donkey Kong games prior to Mario Bros. (1983), the first game with "Mario" in the title. Mario video games have been developed by a variety of developers, with the vast majority produced and published by Nintendo and released on Nintendo's video game consoles.

The flagship Mario subseries is the Super Mario series of platform games starting with 1985's Super Mario Bros., which mostly follows Mario's adventures in the Mushroom Kingdom and typically relies on Mario's jumping ability to allow him to progress through levels. The franchise has spawned over 200 games of various genres and several subseries, including Mario Kart, Mario Party, Mario Tennis, Mario Golf, Mario vs. Donkey Kong, Paper Mario, and Mario & Luigi; several characters introduced in the Mario franchise, such as Luigi, Wario, and Yoshi, sparked successful franchises of their own.

The Mario franchise is Nintendo's flagship franchise and has garnered widespread critical acclaim, with several of its games considered among the greatest video games ever made. It is the best-selling video game franchise of all time, with more than 900 million copies of games sold, including more than 430 million for the Super Mario games alone, and one of the highest-grossing media franchises of all time.

== Premise ==
Media in the Mario franchise usually makes use of episodic instead of serialized plot lines, with the events of one entry bearing little impact on the others. Instead, narrative elements (such as a damsel in distress having to be rescued from a monstrous villain by the protagonist after an ambush or military incursion) are often reused as a backdrop to contextualize more specific scenarios; a measure intended to maximize the franchise's appeal to new audiences.

The roles in this recurring narrative premise are usually filled by the fictional protagonist Mario, an Italian plumber with a jumping superpower, who, along with a rotating cast of allies and ability-granting power-ups, traverses a fantastical environment to rescue Princess Peach from the antagonist King Bowser. This framework, reflecting elements of Western fairy tale traditions, primarily functions as a secondary structure to support gameplay in the franchise's video games, which centers on navigation through a sequence of themed environments populated by cartoonish obstacles, enemies, and interactive objects. The visual and spatial design of the Mario universe reflects Japanese aesthetic tendencies, including an emphasis on expressive environments and the primacy of space over character.

While early Mario video games and adaptations were often described in supplementary material to be set in or linked to real-world locations (such as New York City), this has largely been retconned, with subsequent material having since been adjusted to take place in fictional fantasy locations. These often consist of distinct kingdoms or islands (such as the Mushroom Kingdom, Metro Kingdom or Yoshi's Island) featuring areas designated for levels of specific biotopes or themes, each filled with common characteristics such as warp pipes, anthropomorphic environmental elements, floating blocks, coins and recognizable species.

Spinoff material set in the same universe, but not featuring the titular protagonist and instead depicting stories exclusively involving secondary characters has been produced as well, notably for Donkey Kong, Luigi, Yoshi, Wario, Captain Toad and Princess Peach.

=== Major characters ===
A selection of Mario characters drawn by Shigehisa Nakaue. From left to right: Koopa Paratroopa, Boo, Goomba, Yoshi, Rosalina, Princess Peach, Bowser, Mario, Luigi, Toad, Princess Daisy, Wario, Cheep Cheep, and Waluigi.

Mario
The protagonist of the Mario franchise, Mario is a plumber and older twin brother of Luigi. Originating in the arcade game Donkey Kong, Mario has since appeared in every title in the franchise.

Luigi
Luigi is the younger twin brother of Mario, though is notably taller. Luigi was introduced in the game Mario Bros., and often appears alongside his brother in various games throughout the franchise.

Princess Peach
Princess Peach is the princess of the Mushroom Kingdom. First introduced in Super Mario Bros., she is frequently kidnapped, often by Bowser. The plot of many games in the series revolve around Mario and Luigi setting off to rescue her.

Toad and Toadette
Toad is a short-statured anthropomorphic mushroom-like race of characters that first appeared in Super Mario Bros as support characters, though have later made playable appearances starting with the game Wario's Woods. Specific notable Toads in the franchise include Toadsworth, an aide to Princess Peach, and Captain Toad, an adventurer and star of his own video game. A female variation of Toad named Toadette was later introduced in the game Mario Kart: Double Dash, and transforms into an analogue of Princess Peach dubbed Peachette upon acquiring a Super Crown power-up.

Yoshi
Yoshi is a green anthropomorphic dinosaur. He first appeared in Super Mario World where he served as a mount for Mario and Luigi, and later starred in the Yoshi series.

Donkey Kong
Donkey Kong is an anthropomorphic gorilla that first appeared in the arcade game of the same name. The leader of the Kong Family, he acts as the antagonist of the Mario vs. Donkey Kong series, while also the star of the Donkey Kong franchise.

Bowser
Bowser is the king of the Koopas, a race of turtle-like creatures in the Mario franchise. Very large and able to breathe fire, he was introduced in Super Mario Bros.. Frequently serving as the antagonist for games and media within the Mario franchise, he often kidnaps Princess Peach only to be defeated by Mario and Luigi.

Pauline
Pauline was first introduced in Donkey Kong, where she is kidnapped by the titular character with Mario having to rescue her. She subsequently appears in the Mario vs. Donkey Kong series, as well as other titles in the franchise such as Super Mario Odyssey.

Princess Daisy
Princess Daisy was introduced as the princess of Sarasaland in Super Mario Land, where Mario rescues her from the villain Tatanga. In contrast to Peach, she is often depicted as having a tomboyish demeanor.

Wario
Wario is an obese but muscular character appearing similar to Mario and Luigi. Originally introduced as an antagonist in Super Mario Land 2: 6 Golden Coins, he eventually became an anti-hero in the franchise, and is the star of the Wario series of games.

Waluigi
Waluigi is tall but scrawny character appearing similar to Wario. He was introduced in Mario Tennis, and throughout the franchise is often portrayed as Wario's partner of inconsistently defined relation.

Rosalina
Rosalina is a princess introduced in Super Mario Galaxy, acting as the adoptive mother of creatures known as Lumas, and resides in a starship called the Comet Observatory.

Birdo
Birdo is a pink, anthropomorphic dinosaur who wears a red bow on her head, and has a round mouth that can fire eggs as projectiles, first appearing in Super Mario Bros. 2 as a recurring boss. Early material referred to her as a "man who thinks of himself as female", leading her to some considering her an early example of a transgender video game character.

Nabbit
Nabbit is a rabbit-like character introduced in New Super Mario Bros. U who steals items from the player, though became a playable character himself in later titles in the franchise.

Bowser Jr.
Bowser Jr. is the son of Bowser, introduced in Super Mario Sunshine. He looks up to his father, and shares his ambition to defeat Mario and take over the world and the Mushroom Kingdom.

Koopalings
The Koopalings are relatives of Bowser introduced in Super Mario Bros. 3. Consisting of six boys and one girl, they are each unique koopas armed with magic wands that occasionally appear to aid Bowser in his plans to take over the Mushroom Kingdom.

Kamek
Kamek is a member of the fictional Magikoopa species who is Bowser's childhood caretaker, and later in life one of his high-ranking minions. Kamek is the main antagonist of the Yoshi series, and first appeared in the game Super Mario World 2: Yoshi's Island. He uses magic, including self-duplication, teleportation, magical blasts, and size manipulation. He differs from other Magikoopas by riding a broom. In Japan, his species is also named Kamek.

King Boo
King Boo is the king of the ghost-like Boos, and is the main antagonist of the Luigi's Mansion series, acting as the final boss of the first game.

== Video games ==
=== Origin games ===
==== Donkey Kong ====
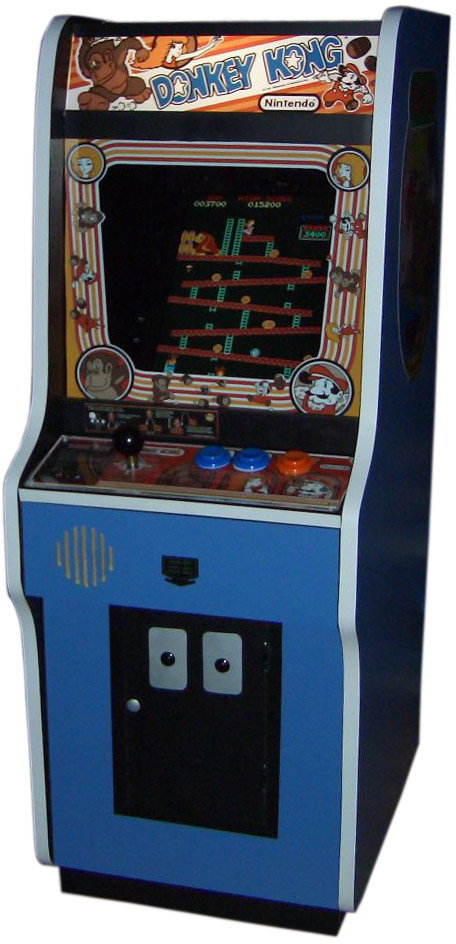
A replica of a Donkey Kong arcade cabinet

After the commercial failure of Radar Scope, Nintendo's company president, Hiroshi Yamauchi, referred to designer Shigeru Miyamoto to create an arcade game to save the company. Miyamoto came up with the idea of a game in which the playable character has to make his way through an obstacle course consisting of sloped platforms, ladders and rolling barrels. Miyamoto named the game Donkey Kong, and its main protagonist "Jumpman". Donkey Kong is an early example of the platform genre. In addition to presenting the goal of saving Pauline, the game gives the player a score. Points are awarded for finishing screens; leaping over obstacles; destroying objects with a hammer power-up; collecting items such as hats, parasols, and purses (presumably belonging to Pauline); and completing other tasks. The game was surprisingly successful. "Jumpman" was called "Mario" in certain promotional materials for the game's release overseas; his namesake was Mario Segale, the landlord of Nintendo of America (NOA)'s office/warehouse, who, according to one version of events, barged in on a meeting to demand an overdue rent payment. This story is contradicted by former NOA warehouse manager Don James, who stated in 2012 that he and then-NOA president Minoru Arakawa named the character after Segale as a joke because Segale was so reclusive that none of the employees had ever met him. James repeated this account in 2018.

==== Donkey Kong Jr. ====
Mario next appeared in 1982's Donkey Kong Jr. as the game's antagonist. Players control Donkey Kong Jr. as he climbs vines and collects keys to save his kidnapped father from Mario. The game was later ported to several platforms including the Famicom, NES, and several Atari home consoles. Additionally, a Game & Watch port and sequel were later produced. Like the first game, it is an early example of the platform genre.

==== Mario Bros. ====
Mario Bros. is the first game to feature "Mario" in the title and to feature Luigi. The objective of Mario Bros is to defeat all of the enemies in each phase. Each phase is a series of platforms with four pipes at each corner of the screen, and an object called a "POW" block in the center. The mechanics of Mario Bros. involve only running and jumping. Unlike future Mario titles, players cannot jump on enemies until they are flipped over; this can be accomplished by jumping under the platform they are on or by using the "POW" block. Both sides of every phase feature a mechanism that allows the player to go off-screen to the left and appear on the right, and vice versa. The game has since reappeared in various forms, including as a minigame in Super Mario Bros. 3 and the Super Mario Advance series, and reimagined as Mario Clash.

==== Game and Watch ====
Nintendo has released several Mario and Donkey Kong LCD video games for the Game & Watch line. Eleven were released between 1982 and 1995. Nintendo also licensed the release of six LCD games for Nelsonic's Game Watch line between 1989 and 1994. Many remakes of Game & Watch games have changed the protagonist from a generic Mr. Game & Watch character to Mario. In 2020, a rerelease of Super Mario Bros. in the form of a Game & Watch titled Game & Watch: Super Mario Bros. was released for the game's 35th anniversary.

=== Super Mario series ===
Mario then became the star of his own side scrolling platform game in 1985, titled Super Mario Bros., which was the pack-in game included with the Nintendo Entertainment System console. It was also later sold in a package with Duck Hunt. In Japan, a game titled Super Mario Bros. 2 (released internationally under the title Super Mario Bros.: The Lost Levels) was released in 1986, but a different game with the same name was released internationally in 1988, followed by Super Mario Bros. 3 later that same year in Japan. Super Mario World then released in 1990 for the Super Nintendo Entertainment System. While Super Mario Land and two sequels were the Game Boy installments in the series, the Game Boy Advance did not receive any original entries, only remakes. Super Mario 64, the first Super Mario game with fully 3D graphics, debuted as the launch title for the Nintendo 64 console in 1996. Super Mario Sunshine was the series' entry for the GameCube, and Super Mario Galaxy and its sequel continued the series for the Wii. Super Mario 3D Land was the series' flagship title for Nintendo 3DS. The Wii U saw the release of Super Mario 3D World in November 2013, re-released as Super Mario 3D World + Bowser's Fury in February 2021. Super Mario Odyssey was released on the Nintendo Switch in 2017.

A number of 2.5D games in the series have recreated the gameplay of the early games. In 2006, a sub-series with retro gameplay called New Super Mario Bros. was inaugurated on the Nintendo DS, featuring the mechanics of the Super Mario Bros. games. It continued on the Wii as New Super Mario Bros. Wii (2009), on the 3DS as New Super Mario Bros. 2 (2012) and on the Wii U as New Super Mario Bros. U (2012) and New Super Luigi U (2013, stylized as New Super Luigi ~~Bros~~ U), with a port of the Wii U games titled New Super Mario Bros. U Deluxe on the Nintendo Switch in January 2019. Super Mario Bros.-styled gameplay is further offered by the level creator game Super Mario Maker, released on Wii U in 2015, with a sequel, Super Mario Maker 2, released on Switch on June 28, 2019. In 2016, Super Mario Run was released as Nintendo's first real smartphone game and one of the few instances a Mario game was developed for non-Nintendo hardware. Super Mario Bros. Wonder was released on Switch on October 20, 2023.

=== Puzzle games ===
==== Dr. Mario series ====
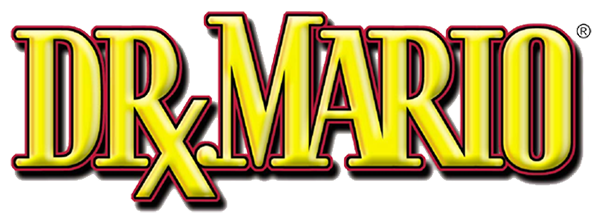
The Dr. Mario series logo

Dr. Mario (Note: Japanese: ドクターマリオ, Hepburn: Dokutā Mario) (stylized as D℞. Mario) is a series of arcade-style puzzle video game originally developed by Nintendo Research & Development 1, and later developed by Arika and produced by Nintendo Software Planning & Development. The first in the series, Dr. Mario, was launched in 1990 on the Nintendo Entertainment System and Game Boy to critical and commercial success. In the Dr. Mario series, the player character Mario, who assumes the role of a doctor, is tasked with eradicating deadly viruses. The player's objective is to destroy the viruses populating the on-screen playing field by using falling colored capsules that are dropped into the field, similarly to Tetris. The player manipulates the capsules as they fall so that they are aligned with viruses of matching colors, which removes them from playing field. The player progresses through the game by eliminating all the viruses on the screen in each level.

There have been 4 Dr. Mario games released for home consoles, two portable games and one mobile game, for a total of seven original titles. As the series has progressed, each new game has introduced new elements to keep the gameplay fresh such as new game modes. In 2001, Dr. Mario 64 for the Nintendo 64 introduced new game modes such as a Story mode, Score Attack and Marathon, Wario as a playable character and four-player multiplayer. After a seven-year hiatus, in 2008, Dr. Mario Express for the Nintendo DSi's DSiWare service re-introduced the series to the portable gaming market. Also in 2008, Dr. Mario Online Rx for the Wii's WiiWare service introduced online multiplayer to the series. In 2013, Dr. Luigi for the Wii U's Nintendo eShop introduced Luigi as the playable character as well as an Operation L game mode in which all capsules assume the shape of the letter "L". A mobile game titled Dr. Mario World was released in 2019, but was permanently discontinued in July 2021.

==== Mario's Picross series ====
This series is a collection of nonogram logic puzzles involving a grid with numbers for every row and column, which refer to the amount of marked squares within the grid. The games features Mario as an archaeologist who chisels away to form images on the grid.

- Mario's Picross
- Picross 2
- Mario's Super Picross

==== Mario vs. Donkey Kong series ====
Mario vs. Donkey Kong (Note: Japanese: マリオVSドンキーコング, Hepburn: Mario tai Donkī Kongu) is a sub-series of the Mario and Donkey Kong series, based on puzzle video games, making the return of Donkey Kong, Pauline, and the former's rivalry with Mario. The sub-series introduces the Mario-like toys known as Mini-Marios, who later replace Mario as the sole playable characters in all future installments starting with Mario vs. Donkey Kong 2: March of the Minis onward.

==== Captain Toad: Treasure Tracker ====
Captain Toad: Treasure Tracker (Note: Known in Japan as Advance! Captain Toad (進め! キノピオ隊長, Susume! Kinopio-taichō)) is a 2014 action puzzle video game developed and published by Nintendo for the Wii U. It is a spin-off of the Super Mario series which builds upon the isometric minigames starring Captain Toad from Super Mario 3D World.

Enhanced ports were released for Nintendo 3DS and Nintendo Switch on July 13, 2018, including additional bonus levels themed around Super Mario Odyssey, but excluding the Super Mario 3D World bonus levels from the Wii U version. The Nintendo Switch port has sold over 1 million copies, making it one of the best-selling games on the system. A free update for the Nintendo Switch version was released on February 13, 2019, adding co-op multiplayer where another player controls a new purple Toad with white spots in the regular chapters alongside Toad/Toadette, and Toadette in the DLC Special Episode.

=== Role-playing games ===
The first role-playing game in the Mario franchise was Super Mario RPG: Legend of the Seven Stars. It has since expanded to the Paper Mario and Mario & Luigi series.

==== Paper Mario series ====
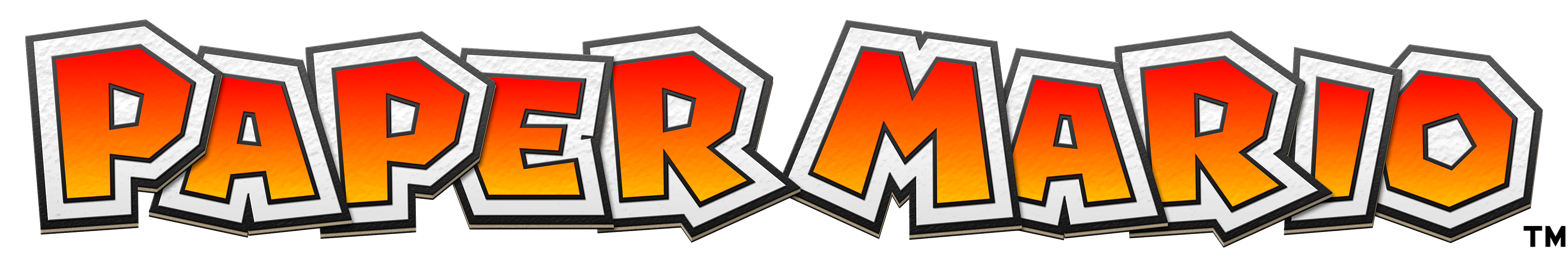
The Paper Mario series logo

Paper Mario (Note: Japanese: ペーパーマリオ, Hepburn: Pēpā Mario) is a spin-off series of RPG video games developed by Intelligent Systems and produced by Nintendo Software Planning & Development. The first game in the series, Paper Mario, was launched in 2000 on the Nintendo 64 to critical and commercial success. In the Paper Mario series, the player controls Mario in a mixture of 3D environments and 2D characters who look as if they are made of paper. Mario can jump and use his hammer to overcome physical obstacles placed in the game's overworld. Additionally, the player accumulates partners as they advance into different locations, who each have a specialized skill required for progression in the game. These characters assist Mario in the game's turn-based battles. Damage inflicted to the player reduces the amount of HP. Attacks in the game are similar to those in traditional RPGs, although the player can influence the power of a move when attacking or defending by timing a button-press accurately or performing some other action command as required. Mario and his partners have a finite capacity to perform special moves, with each of these consuming a particular number of flower points (FP) when performed. Such statistics can be increased by earning Star Points (experience points) in combat to level up. Progression through Paper Mario depends upon interaction with the game's non-player characters (NPCs), who will often offer clues or detail the next event in the storyline. As in other RPGs, the player can find or purchase items from NPCs to help in and outside of combat. Badges can be obtained that yield bonuses ranging from added moves to gradual health restoration during combat; each consumes a set number of Badge Points (BP), meaning Mario can only equip a limited number of badges at a time.

There have been five Paper Mario games released for home consoles and one game on 3DS. As the series has progressed, each new game has introduced new elements to keep the gameplay fresh such as a new story, new partners, and new gameplay mechanics. In 2004, The Thousand-Year Door for the GameCube introduced the ability of Mario turning into and folding up into a paper airplane and/or a paper boat to interact with the overworld. In 2007, Super Paper Mario deviated into the 2D action RPG genre and introduced the ability to "flip" into a 3D perspective in which the level rotates to reveal a hidden z-axis, placing Mario in a 3D environment. In 2012, Sticker Star for the Nintendo 3DS introduced the use of stickers in both the environment and in turn-based battles. They can be found and peeled off from various areas in the overworld, and can be purchased or received from non-playable characters. In 2015, Mario & Luigi: Paper Jam also released for the 3DS, in which all the Paper Mario world enters the real one. In 2016, Color Splash for the Wii U was announced that introduced the use of colors in both the environment and in turn-based battles, just like in Sticker Star. In 2020, The Origami King was announced on the Switch with the use of origami.

==== Mario and Luigi series ====
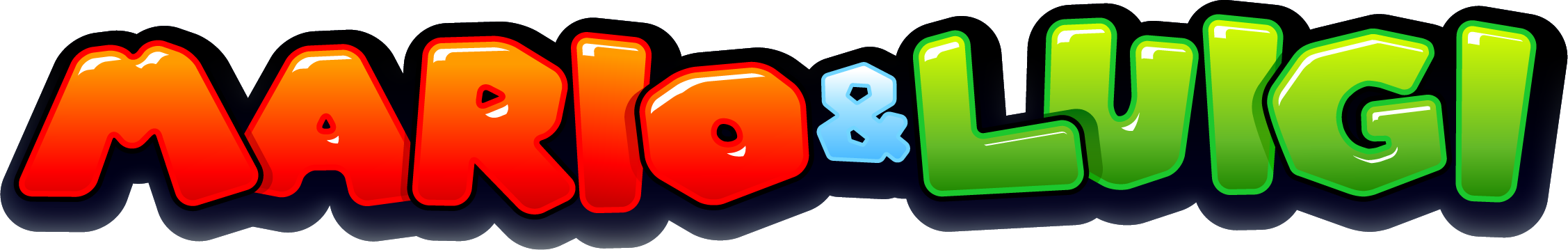
The Mario & Luigi series logo

The Mario & Luigi spin-off series, developed by AlphaDream, was formed exclusively throughout handheld consoles. The series began with the release of Superstar Saga for the Game Boy Advance in 2003. In 2017, Superstar Saga + Bowser's Minions for the Nintendo 3DS introduced a remake of the original game with added graphics, an improved map allowing players to place pinpoints, and an additional mode called Minion Quest: The Search for Bowser, featuring a real-time strategy battle system and following Bowser's underlings as they search for their leader. In 2005, Partners in Time for the Nintendo DS introduced their younger selves: Baby Mario, Baby Luigi, Toadsworth the younger, Baby Peach and Baby Bowser. In 2009, Bowser's Inside Story also for the DS introduced Mario, Luigi and the others inside of Bowser's body. In 2018, Bowser's Inside Story + Bowser Jr.'s Journey for the 3DS introduced a remake of the original game with added graphics, an improved map allowing players to place pinpoints, and an additional mode called Bowser Jr.'s Journey. In 2013, Dream Team for the 3DS introduced Dreamy Luigi, where Luigi sleeps in the Dream World in celebrating the Year of Luigi. In 2015, Paper Jam also for the 3DS also included Paper Mario as a playable character when Luigi knocks over the book containing him. In 2024, a new entry in the series titled Brothership was announced during a Nintendo Direct in June 2024, around nine years after the release of Paper Jam.

=== Party games ===
==== Mario Party series ====
In 1998, the Hudson game Mario Party was released for the Nintendo 64. Following this, nine numbered sequels have since been released, along with four unnumbered main series titles: Mario Party DS (2007), Super Mario Party (2018), Mario Party Superstars (2021), and Super Mario Party Jamboree (2024). The series also has four spins-offs that differ in gameplay, including Mario Party Advance, Island Tour, Star Rush, and The Top 100. Mario Party is a multiplayer party game featuring Mario series characters in which four human- or computer-controlled characters compete in a board game interspersed with minigames.

=== Sports games ===
There have been numerous sports games in the Mario franchise.

==== Mario Tennis series ====
The first appearances of Mario in tennis games were as a referee in Tennis for the NES and Game Boy. These games did not use the Mario branding and only featured Mario in the capacity of a cameo. He then appeared in Mario's Tennis for the Virtual Boy. After this, Camelot Software Planning released Mario Tennis for the Nintendo 64. They would subsequently develop other games in this series: Mario Power Tennis for the GameCube and Wii, Power Tour for the Game Boy Advance, Mario Tennis Open for the Nintendo 3DS, Ultra Smash for the Wii U, and Aces for the Nintendo Switch.

==== Mario Golf series ====
The first use of Mario's likeness in a golf game was that the golfer in Golf for NES and Game Boy featured a mustached man resembling Mario. Later, NES Open Tournament Golf was released. It featured Mario and Luigi as the golfers, with Princess Toadstool and Princess Daisy as their caddies. Mario Golf was released for the Nintendo 64 in 1999. It was followed by Mario Golf: Toadstool Tour for the GameCube, Mario Golf: Advance Tour for the Game Boy Advance and Mario Golf: World Tour for the Nintendo 3DS. Nintendo released Mario Golf: Super Rush for the Nintendo Switch in summer of 2021.

==== Baseball series ====
Mario and Luigi are team captains in Baseball for the Game Boy. Mario Superstar Baseball was released for the GameCube and Mario Super Sluggers for the Wii.

==== Mario Strikers series ====
The Mario Strikers series (Mario Football in Europe) made its debut for the GameCube with Super Mario Strikers in 2005, developed by Next Level Games. Mario Strikers Charged was released for the Wii in 2007. Mario Strikers: Battle League was released for the Nintendo Switch in 2022.

==== Mario and Sonic at the Olympic Games series ====
In 2007, Mario characters appeared alongside the Sonic the Hedgehog characters in the sports game, Mario & Sonic at the Olympic Games, developed by Sega as a crossover series. This was followed by 5 sequels: Olympic Winter Games in 2009, London 2012 Olympic Games in 2011, Sochi 2014 Olympic Winter Games in 2013, Rio 2016 Olympic Games in 2016, and Olympic Games Tokyo 2020 in 2019, with an arcade version of the game releasing in 2020.

==== Racing games ====
===== Mario Kart series =====
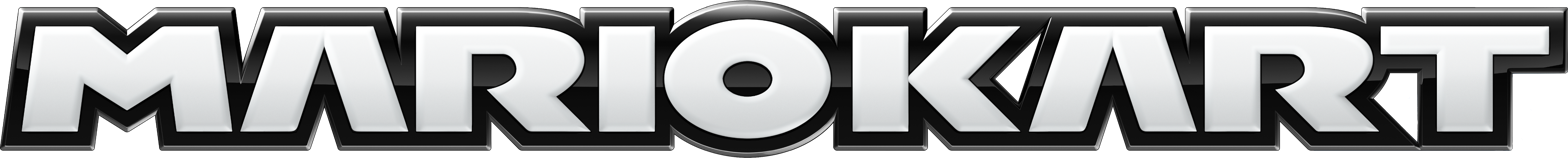
The Mario Kart series logo since Mario Kart DS

Mario Kart (Note: Japanese: マリオカート, Hepburn: Mario Kāto) is a series of go-kart-style racing video games primarily developed by Nintendo Entertainment Analysis & Development. The first in the series, Super Mario Kart, was launched in 1992 on the Super Nintendo Entertainment System to critical and commercial success. In the Mario Kart series, players compete in go-kart races, controlling one of a selection of characters from the Mario franchise. One of the features of the series is the use of various power-up items obtained by driving into item boxes laid out on the course. These power-ups include Super Mushrooms to give players a speed boost, Koopa Troopa Shells to be thrown at opponents, and banana peels that can be laid on the track as hazards.

There have been eight Mario Kart games released for home consoles including one enhanced port, three portable games; one game for smartphones, and four Namco co-developed arcade spin-off games, for a total of sixteen. As the series has progressed, each new game has introduced new elements to keep the gameplay fresh, such as two-player karts (with one player driving and the other using items), motion controls, motorbikes, hang gliding and submersible karts, kart customization, anti-gravity racing, ATVs, and up to 24 racers in a race. The most recent game in the series, Mario Kart World, released on June 5, 2025 as a launch title for the Nintendo Switch 2.

The Mario Kart series is the most successful and longest-running kart racing series, having sold over 150,000,000 copies worldwide.

=== Educational games ===
In the early 1990s, many educational games have been released in the Mario series, with one example being Mario Teaches Typing. Few of these games were platformers; most sought to teach skills such as typing, mathematics or history. They are officially licensed but not officially recognized by Nintendo. The games were developed independently by Software Toolworks, Interplay Entertainment and Brainstorm. Nine educational games were released from 1991 to 1996.

=== Games not published by Nintendo ===
This section covers games developed by other companies without significant Nintendo involvement.

==== Hudson ====
Hudson Soft released two games based on Mario Bros. and another similar to Super Mario Bros.

Mario Bros. Special is a video game released in 1984 for the Japanese computers NEC PC-6001mkII, NEC PC-6601, NEC PC-8801, FM-7 and Sharp X1. It is a remake of the original Mario Bros., with new stages, mechanics and gameplay.

Punch Ball Mario Bros. is a video game released in 1984 for the Japanese computers NEC PC-6001mkII, NEC PC-6601, NEC PC-8801, FM-7 and Sharp X1. It is similar to the original Mario Bros. but featured a new gameplay mechanic of "punch balls", small balls which Mario and Luigi can kick into enemies to stun them, instead of hitting them from below, as in the original.

Hudson Soft was originally responsible for the Mario Party series until Mario Party DS in 2007, but as of March 2012, this has been taken over by NDcube since Hudson has become a part of Konami. Many of Hudson's employees now work for NDcube.

==== Philips ====
Three games were planned for development by Philips Interactive Media for use on its CD-i machine: Super Mario's Wacky Worlds, Hotel Mario, and Mario Takes America. Only Hotel Mario was released; Super Mario's Wacky Worlds and Mario Takes America were eventually canceled. Philips was given permission to use Nintendo characters in CD-i games due to their taking part in developing an unreleased add-on for the Super Nintendo Entertainment System (SNES). Hotel Mario did not gain much success, with Nintendo never acknowledging it as part of the Mario series.

Super Mario's Wacky Worlds is a canceled video game planned for the CD-i, developed by NovaLogic, which attempted to duplicate the gameplay of Super Mario World. Though the game sprites are based on those in Super Mario World, the level design is based on Earth locations rather than Dinosaur Land. Due to the limitations of the CD-i, several features could not be included in the game, such as large numbers of sprites on the screen, and many visual effects. The nature of the pointing device controller provides difficult controls for Mario, as the game has the default controls of running and jumping.

Mario Takes America was proposed about Mario's trip to Hollywood to make his own movie. The game's concept initially impressed Philips, but was canceled due to the company being unsatisfied with the game's development progress.

Hotel Mario is a puzzle game developed by Fantasy Factory and published by Philips Interactive Media for the CD-i in 1994. The primary characters of the game are Mario and Luigi, who must find Princess Peach by going through seven Koopa Hotels in the Mushroom Kingdom. Every hotel is divided into multiple stages, and the objective is to close all doors on each stage. The game has been criticized as one of the worst Mario-centered games, mainly because of its cutscenes and simple gameplay.

==== Ubisoft ====
Mario + Rabbids Kingdom Battle is a turn-based tactical role-playing video game developed by Ubisoft Milan (Ubisoft's Italian studio division) for the Nintendo Switch. The game is a crossover with Ubisoft's Rabbids franchise and features both single-player and cooperative multiplayer gameplay. The game's story sees players controlling Mario, his friends, and a group of Rabbids dressed as them, dealing with the aftermath of a sudden invasion by a group of Rabbids, who have accidentally misused a powerful invention that has brought chaos to the Mushroom Kingdom. Shigeru Miyamoto was initially impressed by the prototype of the game, that was presented to him by creative director Davide Soliani in 2014, which later caused Nintendo to greenlight the game for a Nintendo Switch release. It was released in Europe and North America on August 29, 2017, and was met with generally favorable reception from critics, who praised its gameplay, depth, and graphics.

A sequel, Mario + Rabbids Sparks of Hope, was released on October 28, 2022, for the Nintendo Switch.

==== Others ====
Electronic Arts (creator of games such as FIFA, Battlefield, Apex Legends and many other games) developed and released NBA Street V3 and SSX on Tour in 2005, both of which included Mario, Luigi, and Peach as playable characters in the GameCube versions.

Square Enix released Itadaki Street DS & Wii including many characters from Mario games.

== Other media ==
The Mario franchise includes many comics, manga and TV series based on the games. Most were released in the late 1980s to early 1990s, and have since become obscure. The series launched three films. The anime Super Mario Bros.: The Great Mission to Rescue Princess Peach! was released in 1986. The 1993 live action film Super Mario Bros. lost a large amount of money at the box office and was widely considered to be a failure. In contrast, the 2023 animated film The Super Mario Bros. Movie broke box office records. On April 1, 2026, a sequel to the film, The Super Mario Galaxy Movie, was released.

=== Television ===
Saturday Supercade was an animated television series produced for Saturday mornings by Ruby-Spears Productions. It ran for two seasons on CBS, beginning in 1983. Each episode comprised several shorter segments featuring video game characters from the Golden Age of Arcade Games. Donkey Kong, Mario and Pauline (from the Donkey Kong arcade game) were featured in the show.

The Super Mario Bros. Super Show! is the first American TV series based on the Mario NES games. It was broadcast in syndication from September 4 to December 1, 1989. Based on Super Mario Bros. and Super Mario Bros. 2. The show was produced by DIC Entertainment and was distributed for syndicated television by Viacom Enterprises (full rights have since reverted to DiC through Nintendo).

King Koopa's Kool Kartoons was a live action children's television show broadcast in Southern California during the holiday season of 1989–90. The show starred King Koopa (also known as Bowser), the main antagonist of the Mario series. The 30-minute program was originally broadcast during the after-school afternoon timeslots on Los Angeles-based KTTV Fox 11.

The Adventures of Super Mario Bros. 3 is the second TV series based on the Mario NES games. It aired on NBC from September 8 to December 1, 1990. Based on the Super Mario Bros. 3 video game, the cartoon shows Mario, Luigi, Princess Toadstool and Toad fighting against Bowser and his Koopalings, who went by different names on the show (Hip, Hop, Kooky, Kootie Pie, Big Mouth, Cheatsy, and Bully).

Super Mario Challenge was a show which aired on The Children's Channel. It ran from 1990 to 1991 and aired at 4:30 p.m. every weekday. The presenter, John Lenahan, was a lookalike of Mario, and dressed in his clothes. Two guest players had to do tasks, all of which involved playing the Mario video games Super Mario Bros., Super Mario Bros. 2 and, after its release in 1991, Super Mario Bros. 3. Rounds included challenges to see which player could complete a level in the fastest time and who could collect the most gold coins on a certain level.

Super Mario World is an animated television series based on the SNES video game of the same name. It is the third and currently last Saturday morning cartoon based on the Mario series. The show was originally aired on Saturday mornings on NBC in the 1991–92 season. It was featured in a half-hour time slot with a shortened version of Captain N: The Game Master. Episodes of Super Mario World were later shown as part of the syndication package Captain N & The Video Game Masters. Afterwards, the series was split from Captain N altogether and shown in time-compressed reruns on Mario All-Stars.

=== Films and anime ===
Super Mario Bros.: The Great Mission to Rescue Princess Peach! is a Japanese anime film released on July 20, 1986. Directed by Masami Hata and produced by Masakatsu Suzuki and Tsunemasa Hatano, it stars Mario and Luigi, who get stuck in a Famicom video game, in which they must save Princess Peach from King Koopa. A manga adaptation of the film was published in Japan around the same time as the film's release.

A series of three OVA episodes titled Amada Anime Series: Super Mario Bros., based on Momotarō, Issun-bōshi and Snow White, were released on August 3, 1989. These generally featured Mario as the hero, Peach as the damsel and Bowser as the villain, with other Mario characters playing supporting roles.

==== 1993 live-action film ====
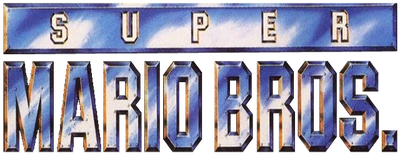
Logo for Super Mario Bros.

Super Mario Bros. is an American 1993 adventure family comedy loosely based on the video game of the same name. The film follows the exploits of Mario (Bob Hoskins) and Luigi (John Leguizamo) in a dystopia ruled by King Koopa (Dennis Hopper). It was the first live-action major motion picture to be based on a video game. The film's plot features Mario and Luigi as the main protagonists, Mario leading the team with Luigi developing a romance with Princess Daisy (Samantha Mathis).

The film grossed $39 million on a $48 million budget. On the television show Siskel & Ebert, the film received two thumbs down and was written off as a box office flop.

==== Animated film series ====
Logo for The Super Mario Bros. Movie

The Super Mario Bros. Movie was released on April 5, 2023, by Universal Pictures in North America and Oceania. Produced by Illumination and Nintendo, the film stars the voices of Chris Pratt as Mario, Anya Taylor-Joy as Peach, Charlie Day as Luigi, Jack Black as Bowser, Keegan-Michael Key as Toad, Seth Rogen as Donkey Kong, Fred Armisen as Cranky Kong, Kevin Michael Richardson as Kamek and Sebastian Maniscalco as Foreman Spike. Charles Martinet, Mario's in-game voice actor, also provided cameo roles. The directors were Aaron Horvath and Michael Jelenic, the developers of Teen Titans Go!, while Matthew Fogel wrote the screenplay. Shigeru Miyamoto and Chris Meledandri are the producers. The film was a commercial success, becoming the third highest grossing animated film and the 15th highest grossing film of all time at the time.

A sequel, The Super Mario Galaxy Movie, was released on April 1, 2026.

=== Comics and manga ===
Super Mario-kun (Note: Japanese: スーパーマリオくん, Hepburn: Sūpā Mario-kun) is a manga series written by Yukio Sawada and published by Shogakukan. It is serialized in CoroCoro Comic. It contains many characters and scenarios from Mario games, such as Super Mario World and Paper Mario. Having just hit its 41st volume, Super Mario-kun is the longest-running Mario series manga to date. It continues to release new volumes to date. Another consistent manga series of the same name based on various Mario games is a work written and drawn by Hiroshi Takase and published by PikkaPika Comics. After five volumes, production stopped due to the author's death in 2006.

The Nintendo Comics System was a series of comic books published by Valiant Comics in 1990 and 1991. It was part of a licensing deal with Nintendo, featuring characters from their video games and the cartoons based on them. Valiant's Super Mario Bros. comic books were based on the three main Mario games on the Nintendo Entertainment System, as well as The Super Mario Bros. Super Show. The Mario line was renewed for 1991 with two different books—Super Mario Bros. and Adventures of the Super Mario Bros.

The Nintendo Adventure Book series was published from 1991 to 1992 by Archway books, and Mammoth books in the United Kingdom. There are twelve in all. They are formatted like the popular Choose Your Own Adventure books, where the reader makes decisions that change the outcome of the story. Ten of the books are about the Mario Bros.' adventures in the Mushroom Kingdom and are based primarily on the Valiant Comics published for the Nintendo Comics System imprint.

Super Mario Adventures (Note: Japanese: SUPER MARIO ADVENTURES マリオの大冒険, Hepburn: Mario no daibōken) is an anthology of comics, drawn in a Japanese manga style, that ran in Nintendo Power magazine throughout 1992, featuring the characters from Nintendo's Mario series and based loosely on Super Mario World.

Immediately following the end of Super Mario Adventures, Nintendo Power concluded the epic with a ten-page story based on Super Mario Land 2: 6 Golden Coins titled Mario VS Wario, which ran in their January 1993 issue and was later reprinted in the graphic novel.

Shitamachi Ninjō Gekijō, also known as Lily Franky Theater, was officially licensed by Nintendo as a Japanese Satellaview virtual magazine broadcast from 1995 to 1996 that featured both manga episodes and live-action segments using Super Mario plushes. It was noted for uncharacteristically adult humor, including a scene in which Toad performs oral sex on Peach.

At one point, Archie Comics made a pitch to Nintendo for a new Mario comic similar to its Sonic the Hedgehog series, but it was turned down.

An encyclopedia based on Super Mario Bros. was released in Japan in October 2015. In February 2017, Nintendo announced that the encyclopedia would launch in North America and Europe in June 2017.

Another encyclopedia based on the series up until Super Mario Maker was published by Dark Horse Publishing on October 23, 2018.

=== Merchandise ===
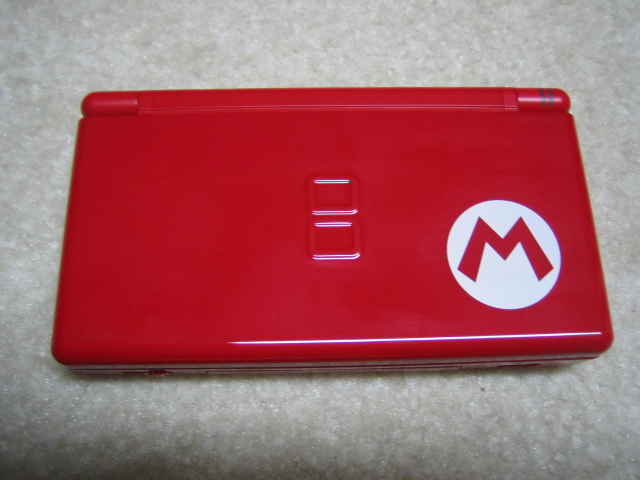
A Mario-themed Nintendo DS Lite

Mario has appeared on lunch boxes, T-shirts, jeans, magazines, commercials (notably, in a Got Milk? commercial), in candy form, on shampoo bottles, cereal, badges, and as a plush toy. In 1992, Gottlieb produced a Mario themed pinball machine. A Monopoly board game based on the Mario franchise has been confirmed by the website USAopoly. Nintendo released two non-game applications featuring Mario on their DSiWare service, Mario Clock and Mario Calculator, in 2009. In April 2017, a board game developed by USAopoly titled Super Mario Level Up! was announced for release. Another Monopoly-inspired board game called Monopoly Gamer was released in August 2017. In addition, Monopoly Gamer adds a Mario Kart version with courses from Mario Kart 8 serving as properties. LINE released four voiced Mario sticker sets. Mario-themed Lego sets were released in August 2020. These sets feature an electronic Mario figure that interacts with other parts of the set.

=== Concerts and performances ===
The Super Mario Bros. theme has been featured in many concerts, including "PLAY! Chicago", the Columbus Symphony Orchestra, the Mario & Zelda Big Band Live, Play! A Video Game Symphony, and others.

The Video Games Live concert featured the theme performed by Koji Kondo.

== Reception ==
The Mario series has received highly positive reception from critics and audiences. A 1996 article in Next Generation declared that "The evolution of the Mario series led the rest of gaming by the hand, blazing a trail, and teaching lessons in game mechanics, structure, and sheer playability to any who would study its secrets". The series had sold 130 million copies worldwide by 1997.

== Legacy ==
Mario has been featured in 256 games of various genres (including sports, puzzle, party, racing and first-person shooter), and the Mario franchise is the best-selling video game franchise of all time. At least 31 different Mario games have sold more than a million copies each since 1995. This includes the core Super Mario series, which alone has sold over 430 million units worldwide, as well as the Mario Kart series, which has sold 189.85 million units; the Mario Party series, which has sold over 84 million copies; Donkey Kong, which has sold over 125,000 arcade machines and six million Coleco cartridges; and Mario Bros., which has sold 1.72 million Famicom cartridges. By 1999, Mario as a character generated more than $5 billion in sales for Nintendo. By 2002, the Super Mario series had grossed more than $7 billion in software sales. At its peak, the franchise sold over $200 million in merchandise annually.
