= Dr. Luigi =

2013 video game

- Developers: Arika; Nintendo SPD
- Publisher: Nintendo
- Directors: Takao Nakano; Tomoko Nakayama; Daiki Sasaki
- Producers: Hitoshi Yamagami; Ichirou Mihara
- Designer: Tatsuya Ushiroda
- Composer: Masaru Tajima
- Series: Dr. Mario; Luigi
- Platform: Wii U
- Release: NA: December 31, 2013; WW: January 15, 2014
- Genre: Puzzle
- Modes: Single-player, multiplayer

Dr. Luigi, known in Japan as Dr. Luigi & Bacteria Eradication, (Note: Japanese: Dr. LUIGI & 細菌撲滅, Hepburn: Dr. Luigi & Saikin Bokumetsu) is a 2013 puzzle video game developed by Arika and Nintendo SPD and published by Nintendo as a digital title for the Wii U via the Nintendo eShop. The sixth installment in the Dr. Mario series, the game was created as a part of the Year of Luigi celebration; which commemorated the thirtieth anniversary of the character Luigi.

Like its predecessors, Dr. Luigi's gameplay revolves around tile-matching pill capsules with their associated virus to clear them from the playing field. The primary goal of the game is to eliminate every virus on the field to score points and avoid overflow of pills. The game offers four modes: "Operation L", which utilizes L-shaped pills; "Virus Buster", using the Wii U GamePad and touchscreen; "Retro Remedy" with standard Dr. Mario gameplay; and local and online multiplayer options, online utilizing the defunct Nintendo Network Service.

Dr. Luigi's release marked the Year of Luigi celebration's continuation into the next calendar year of 2014; from its original start in 2013. It was announced via a Nintendo Direct in December, and released on December 31, 2013, in North America and January 15, 2014, worldwide. Critical reception was average, with mixed opinions regarding its various modes and criticism for its lack of innovation. The game was followed by Dr. Mario: Miracle Cure in 2015, which includes some of Dr. Luigi's gameplay elements. On March 27, 2023, The Wii U eShop was shut down, making it impossible to purchase and download the game.

== Gameplay ==
The standard "Operation L" gameplay mode in progress

Dr. Luigi is a tile-matching puzzle video game. In each round of the game, the player controls Luigi to eliminate the randomly placed viruses. Randomly colored pills are dropped onto the top of the field, distinguished by a bottle, and can be rotated by the player in four directions. When four or more capsule halves or viruses of matching color are aligned in vertical or horizontal configurations, they disappear. Any remaining floating capsules fall. The main objective is to complete levels, by eliminating all viruses from the playing field. A game over occurs if capsules reach the top of the playing field. Adjustable gameplay settings include the capsule falling speed, or highlighting where the capsule will land on the field.

The game includes four game modes: "Operation L", where the capsules used are conjoined into an L-shape and move at a slower pace; "Virus Buster", a mode first introduced in Dr. Mario Online Rx, which is played by holding the Wii U GamePad vertically and using the touchscreen to drag and drop the capsules; "Retro Remedy", which uses traditional Dr. Mario series rules and lacks the gimmicks of Operation L; and local and online multiplayer. In multiplayer, each player clears their own playing field of viruses before the opponent does. Eliminating multiple viruses or initiating chain reactions can cause additional capsules to fall onto the opponent's playing field. A player wins a single game upon eliminating all the viruses or if the opponent's playing field fills up. The first player to win three games wins overall.

== Development and release ==
Dr. Luigi was developed by Arika, the developers of Dr. Mario Online Rx and Dr. Mario Express in 2008, and Nintendo SPD. Most of the contents are reused gameplay from old games, such as Virus Buster, which retains a similar concept from Online Rx, with the addition of updated graphics and sound. The main theme is a remix of the original track from Dr. Mario in 1990, composed by Hirokazu Tanaka. The game was developed for the Year of Luigi celebration, which celebrated the 30th anniversary of Luigi's debut in 1983. The anticipated ending of the celebration was the end of 2013, but Nintendo of America president Reggie Fils-Aimé said that "there will be some Luigi products to carry the Luigi banner into the next calendar year." Dr. Luigi was announced via a December Nintendo Direct, and was released on December 31, 2013, in North America and January 15, 2014, internationally. Various elements from Dr. Luigi, such as Operation L, are in the game's successor, Dr. Mario: Miracle Cure.

== Reception ==
Reception

Aggregate scores
Aggregator	Score
Metacritic	65/100
OpenCritic	30% recommend

Review scores
Publication	Score
4Players	65/100
Eurogamer	5/10
Game Informer	8/10
GameSpot	5/10
IGN	7.5/10
Nintendo Life	7/10
Polygon	7/10
USgamer	2.5/5

Dr. Luigi's critical reception was average, having a score of 65/100 on review aggregator website Metacritic based on 38 reviews. Fellow review aggregator OpenCritic assessed that the game received fair approval, being recommended by 30% of critics. In the first week of release in Europe, Dr. Luigi was the number one bestseller on the Wii U eShop, ahead of F1 Race Stars and the re-release of The Legend of the Mystical Ninja.

The game's new gimmick, Operation L, received mixed opinions, mainly involving its simplistic additions to the Dr. Mario format. GameSpot's Heidi Kemps called Operation L "a disappointment" due to the shape's oversized nature that didn't allow for specific placement. Contrarily, IGN reviewer Scott Thompson originally thought that L-shaped pills would be a "shallow gimmick", but found it to be more entertaining than the traditional Dr. Mario gameplay. Game Informer's Mike Futter often played Retro Remedy instead of Operation L due in part to the difficulty of randomly-generated Operation L levels. Chris Schilling of Eurogamer liked the simple gameplay function and optional intense difficulty. Writing for 4Players, Jens Bischoff called Operation L "practically the only unique selling point of the download" and that it wasn't enough to justify its US$15 price.

In comparison, Virus Buster was viewed more positively for its intuitive nature. Futter enjoyed the change of pace in Virus Buster, and how it shook up gameplay but retained the same mechanics. Thompson praised Virus Buster for its laid-back nature and more relaxing music, as a less stressful alternative to the other modes available. Virus Buster was a favorite of Polygon reviewer Ben Kuchera, lauded for being "a more direct, intuitive way to control the game" with a steady increase in difficulty. Kemps believed that Virus Buster benefited from using the Wii U GamePad instead of a Wii Remote used in the previous game.

Online modes were considered functional yet lackluster. Kemps criticized the online features for lacking content and easy navigation, but he said that the features were at the least functional. Lee Meyer of Nintendo Life praised the online modes for utilizing handicaps to level the playing field, and because lag was "non-existent" with minimal downtime between rounds.

The original Dr. Mario was released in 1990 after the success of Tetris, and, according to Schilling, the gameplay has not held up to modern standards due to its lack of change. He also found the price point to be high but considered this in part due to the free nature of Dr. Mario Online RX. He found all of the modes except multiplayer to be too repetitive for long-term play. Jeremy Parrish of USgamer shared similar opinions but said it had more replay value in comparison to prior games, mainly due to the number of modes available. Meyer and Kuchera saw little change in the formula but thought that the contents still worked as a pleasing puzzle game; according to Kuchera, Dr. Luigi was "a satisfying, customizable collection of puzzle games — even if it all feels a little too safe."

== See also ==
- New Super Luigi U – Another video game released for the Year of Luigi celebration
- List of Mario puzzle games
