= Dr. Mario: Miracle Cure =

2015 video game

- Developers: Arika; Nintendo SPD
- Publisher: Nintendo
- Director: Takao Nakano
- Producers: Hitoshi Yamagami; Ichirou Mihara
- Designer: Tatsuya Ushiroda
- Composer: Masaru Tajima
- Series: Dr. Mario
- Platform: Nintendo 3DS
- Release: JP: May 31, 2015; WW: June 11–12, 2015
- Genre: Puzzle
- Modes: Single-player, multiplayer

Dr. Mario: Miracle Cure (Note: Released in Japan as Dr. Mario Gyakuten! Miracle medicine & germ eradication (Dr. MARIO ギャクテン！特効薬 & 細菌撲滅; lit. Dr. Mario Reverse! Wonder Drug and Bacteria Eradication)) is a 2015 puzzle video game developed by Arika and Nintendo SPD, and published by Nintendo for the Nintendo 3DS. Announced during a Nintendo Direct in June 2015, it was released on the eShop in Japan in May 2015, and North America, Europe, and Australia in June 2015. Part of the larger Mario franchise, it is the seventh game in the Dr. Mario series, and the second to be released on handheld consoles.

In the game, the player's objective is to destroy viruses by matching them to colored capsules that are automatically tossed by the titular Dr. Mario. It introduces new elements to the Dr. Mario franchise, while also including and improving on mechanics from previous Dr. Mario games, such as bringing back modes and features from Dr. Luigi. It offers several unique game modes, with two including additional online and local multiplayer variants, and introduces the "Miracle Cure" power-ups.

Dr. Mario: Miracle Cure received mixed reviews from critics, who praised its new modes and online mode, while subsequently criticizing the lack of unique features and the inferior, simplistic versions of previous modes from other games. In March 2023, the 3DS eShop was shut down, making it impossible to purchase and download the game.

== Gameplay ==
The game is centered around the titular Dr. Mario (top right), and its core gameplay focuses on eliminating viruses by aligning capsules of matching colors to their corresponding virus.

Dr. Mario: Miracle Cure is a falling block puzzle video game, starring the titular Dr. Mario. It houses 3 main game modes, each with different types of gameplay. The first mode, "Dr. Mario", has the traditional rules of the Dr. Mario series, where randomly placed viruses must be eliminated by falling capsules placed by the player, with the goal being to match the color of the capsule to the color of the virus. The game ends if the capsules reach the top of the screen and the viruses haven't been eliminated in time. In "Dr. Luigi", two different capsules joined into L-shaped configurations are dropped into the playing field, taking from the "Operation L" mode of the game Dr. Luigi for the Wii U, which has similar mechanics; this mode allows the player to play as Mario's brother, Dr. Luigi. "Virus Buster", a game mode present in Dr. Mario Online Rx, is played by holding the Nintendo 3DS vertically and using its touchscreen to drag the capsules to the viruses.

All of these modes, except "Virus Buster", can be played in multiplayer, both online and local, alongside single player mode. The online mode allows players to play matches with other players online, utilizing the now-defunct Nintendo Network service. Also available is the "Miracle Cure Laboratory", which makes its debut in the game, and features multiple set challenges. Each getting increasingly difficult, the challenges combine different aspects from the 3 modes, such as the regular capsules and the L-shaped ones. Also introduced are the "Miracle Cures", which are new power-ups that enhance gameplay by clearing all viruses on screen and offering help to the player, being unlocked when a meter seen alongside the game is filled; this mode can be toggled on or off.

== Development and release ==
Dr. Mario: Miracle Cure was developed by Arika and Nintendo SPD, and published by Nintendo for the 3DS. The game was originally announced on May 31, 2015, during a Japanese Nintendo Direct, and was made available on the Japanese eShop on the same day. A Nintendo Direct Micro broadcast on June 1, 2015, unveiled that the game was to be released in North America later in the month on June 11 as a downloadable title exclusive to the eShop, and was made available for pre-order following the announcement. The game was subsequently released in the PAL regions of Europe and Australia on June 11, 2015, and June 12, 2015, respectively. The Wii U and 3DS eShop officially shut down in March 2023, rendering every game released exclusively for it, including Dr. Mario: Miracle Cure, impossible to purchase and download.

== Reception ==
Reception

Aggregate scores
Aggregator	Score
Metacritic	69/100
OpenCritic	18% recommend

Review scores
Publication	Score
Destructoid	7/10
GameSpot	7/10
GamesRadar+	3.5/5
Nintendo Life	8/10
Nintendo World Report	7/10
Pocket Gamer	3.5/5

Dr. Mario: Miracle Cure received "mixed or average" reviews from critics, according to the review aggregation website Metacritic. Fellow review aggregator OpenCritic assessed that the game received fair approval, being recommended by 18% of critics who reviewed the game.

Jason Venter of GameSpot praised the power-ups new to the series and the subsequent new puzzles, but felt that the "Miracle Cure Laboratory" needed more than 50 stages. He appreciated the return of the "Dr. Luigi" and "Virus Buster" gameplay modes, although he criticized how "slow" the latter mode felt compared to its original iteration in Dr. Luigi. Divided on the game, Bryan Rose of Nintendo World Report highlighted the "Miracle Cures", new gameplay elements, and the "lag free" online mode, while criticizing it for sticking to the series' general formula without adding much and the "lackluster presentation"; he felt the character models looked serviceable, but disliked the lack of movement Mario and Luigi have when on screen, calling everything else related to the game "perfectly average", resulting in the game feeling rushed and unpolished.

Pocket Gamer reviewer Mark Brown highlighted the modes and amount of content present, but found the game "claustrophobic" in its gameplay, making it "more frustrating than exciting" without offering enough new material that Brown felt could entice players. GamesRadar+'s Shabana Arif was pleased with the amount of new content that it added, which he felt was a "bargain". Despite this, Arif heavily criticized the Dr. Luigi mode as having "clunky" gameplay with its L-shaped capsules, feeling it was "[a] bad design shoehorned in as a nod to [Luigi] during his time in the spotlight", referring to the marketing campaign from the year prior, the Year of Luigi. Arif recommended the online and local play modes as alternatives to the AI used in regular matches, ending his review by stating that it "lived up" to Dr. Mario Express.

More positively, Marcel van Duyn of Nintendo Life praised the gameplay and amount of content, also calling the use of the "Miracle Cures" a fun addition to the series. Duyn commended it for having enough content so players would not grow tired of any single mode, as well as the online battle variants of some modes being "entertaining". Destructoid's Chris Carter was far more critical, criticizing the game for not expanding on previous gameplay elements and adding unneeded power-ups, a feature Carter felt did not add to the gameplay, but lauded the online multiplayer as the "smoothest [online mode] of any recent Nintendo game". While he enjoyed the quality of life improvements featured in Dr. Mario: Miracle Cure, Carter asserted that the multiplayer mode was the highlight of the game, leaving the single player experience feeling effortless on Nintendo's part.

=== Sales ===
Upon its release, Dr. Mario: Miracle Cure ranked third on the Nintendo eShop charts in Japan, only behind The Battle Cats POP! and BoxBoy!. The game would continue to place on the chart throughout the rest of June and remained charted until the week of September 17, 2015.
