= Dr. Mario Express =

2008 video game

- Developer: Arika
- Publisher: Nintendo
- Directors: Hiroyasu Hashidate; Kazuki Yoshihara
- Producers: Ichirou Mihara; Hitoshi Yamagami
- Designers: Tatsuya Ushiroda; Takuma Yano
- Programmer: Shinichi Masuda
- Artists: Toki Kando; Yoshinori Oda
- Composers: Koichi Kyuma; Masaru Tajima
- Series: Dr. Mario
- Platform: Nintendo DSi
- Release: JP: December 24, 2008; NA: April 20, 2009; PAL: May 1, 2009
- Genre: Puzzle
- Mode: Single-player

Dr. Mario Express, (Note: Known in Japan as Chotto Dr. Mario (Japanese: ちょっとDr. MARIO; lit. A little bit Dr. Mario)) known in PAL regions as A Little Bit of... Dr. Mario, is a Mario puzzle video game developed by Arika and published by Nintendo for the Nintendo DSi's DSiWare service. It was released as a launch title for the service in Japan on December 24, 2008 and internationally in 2009. Developer Arika had previously developed the WiiWare title Dr. Mario Online Rx.

Dr. Mario Express features the general gameplay of earlier Dr. Mario puzzle games, which focus on eliminating colored viruses from the playing field by matching them with colored capsules. Dr. Mario Express received generally positive reviews, but was criticized for offering fewer playable game modes than earlier Dr. Mario titles.

== Gameplay ==
Dr. Mario Express is a falling block tile-matching video game. The player is given a playing field, seen in the Nintendo DSi's bottom screen, populated with viruses of three colors: red, blue, and yellow. Mario, who has assumed the role of a doctor, drops two-colored medicinal capsules into the playing field. The player manipulates these capsules as they fall, moving them left or right and rotating them such that they become aligned alongside viruses of matching colors. When four capsule halves and viruses of matching color are joined together in a straight line, they are removed from play. The main objective of the game therefore is to remove all the viruses from the playing field without letting the capsules themselves pile up and obstruct the opening into the field. Successive levels increase the initial number of viruses to clear. The player is scored based on the viruses cleared in conjunction with the current game speed. Dr. Mario Express also keeps track of the player's current high score.

While the game lacks multiplayer support, Dr. Mario Express offers a "VS CPU" mode in which the player plays against a computer-controlled player, which has its own playing field visible in the DSi top screen. The player's goal is to clear their playing field of all the viruses before the computer player does. The player will win the game upon eliminating all the viruses or if the other playing field fills up with capsules.

== Reception ==
Reception

Aggregate scores
Aggregator	Score
GameRankings	78.33%
Metacritic	76/100

Review scores
Publication	Score
IGN	7.5/10
Nintendo Life	8/10
Official Nintendo Magazine	79%
Pocket Gamer	3.5/5

Dr. Mario Express received generally positive reviews, gaining aggregate scores of 78.33% and 76 on GameRankings and Metacritic. Critics generally praised the gameplay but lamented the lack of the multiplayer mode offered in earlier Dr. Mario games. NintendoLife awarded the game a score of 8 out of 10, applauding the "addictive" gameplay and calling it a "welcome addition to [the] DSiWare library." It noted, however, that "the omission of a multiplayer mode is likely to rub some longtime fans of the game the wrong way." Daemon Hatfield of IGN scored the game 7.5 out of 10, stating the single-player experience is "solid" but "the lack of multiplayer hinders its lifespan." Pocket Gamer awarded Dr. Mario Express 7 out of 10 along with a Bronze Award. Reviewer Jon Jordan called Dr. Mario Express "a great puzzle game," but criticized the presentation, particularly the small size of the playing field and the graphics, which he felt were "terribly old fashioned and badly animated." Jordan ultimately concluded that because of the lack of additional features, "it could have been a superb addition to the DSi software library [but instead] feels more like a scraping from the barrel."
