= Tetris & Dr. Mario =

1994 video game

- North American box art
- Publisher: Nintendo
- Producer: Gunpei Yokoi
- Programmers: Masao Yamamoto; Hitoshi Yamasaki
- Artists: Chiemi Haruki; Mika Inoue; Kayoko Isozaki
- Composers: Kazumi Totaka; Hirokazu Tanaka
- Series: Dr. Mario; Tetris
- Platform: Super Nintendo Entertainment System
- Release: NA: December 1994; EU: July 25, 1995
- Genre: Puzzle
- Modes: Single player, multiplayer

Tetris & Dr. Mario is a 1994 puzzle video game compilation published by Nintendo for the Super Nintendo Entertainment System. It contains enhanced remakes of Tetris (1989) and Dr. Mario (1990), which were originally released for both the Nintendo Entertainment System and Game Boy in North America. Both games include split-screen multiplayer and a "Mixed Match" mode that transitions between the two games.

The Japanese version of the game excludes Tetris due to Bullet-Proof Software holding the console rights to the series in Japan. The remake of Dr. Mario was also broadcast through the Satellaview, renamed BS Dr. Mario, and was the last game to be broadcast on the system. Tetris & Dr. Mario received generally positive reviews, with critics praising its controls and multiplayer, particularly the Mixed Match mode. It sold 6 million copies.

== Gameplay ==
Screenshot showing a multiplayer game of Dr. Mario in Mixed Match mode

Tetris & Dr. Mario shares a similar design to the respective NES versions of the games included while featuring music from their Game Boy versions. In Tetris, players must use different types of falling tetrominoes to form complete lines from the left to the right of the playfield, without any holes between them. Completed lines will disappear and cause any blocks on top to fall towards the bottom. Players can rotate the blocks to place them in specific spots, and can also hold down to make them fall faster. Once all the blocks reach the top of the screen, the game will be over. Tetris includes the "A-Type" and "B-Type" modes from the Game Boy version, alongside a head-to-head multiplayer mode.

In Dr. Mario, players must use colored pills to defeat the viruses littered around the playfield. Viruses come in red, yellow and blue, and must be eliminated by matching two or more same-colored pills either horizontally or vertically. These pills can be one solid color or a mixture of two, one on each side. Pills can be rotated around, and can be dropped faster by pressing down. Once all the viruses have been cleared, the player will move onto the next stage. The game will be over if the pills reach the top of the screen. Dr. Mario features a two-player mode where both players must compete against each other to clear the stage of viruses.

Alongside both games, a "Mixed Match" multiplayer mode is also included, where players must compete for the most points before time runs out. The mode transitions between both games as players progress, beginning on Tetris' B-Type mode before moving to Dr. Mario and so forth. The player with the most points at the end is the winner. Before the game begins, players can customize the music, time limit, and difficulty level.

== Reception ==
Reception

Review scores
Publication	Score
M! Games	85%
Mega Fun	82%
Official Nintendo Magazine	70/100
Player One	90%
Video Games (DE)	80%

Since its release, Tetris & Dr. Mario has sold 6 million copies, which a Kombo writer attributed to its Mixed Match mode.

From contemporary reviews, Nintendo Power wrote that the game was appropriately challenging and fun. A reviewer in GamePro stated that the sharp controls and absorbing action made the game better and while complimenting the graphics and sounds, the reviewer said they "aren't key factors here."

Both GamePro and Nintendo Power found the highlights to be the "Mixed Match" mode and two-player modes respectively while saying the game may not have much to offer to players who already own either Tetris or Dr. Mario.

From retrospective reviews, IGN writer Fran Mirabella said the release was a "puzzle lover's dream cartridge", while fellow IGN writer Lucas M. Thomas held that the Mixed Match mode helped it stand out. Tetris & Dr. Mario was particularly successful for its multiplayer component, as noted by The Verge writer Noah Davis. Writer Andromeda praised the Mixed Match mode and the controls, stating that they are "better as a pair than they were alone." It ranked 27th on IGN's top list of Super Nintendo games. The publication found that the "Mixed Match" mode was a large factor for the games inclusion. Retro Gamer writer Stephen Westwood identified it as one of their favorite puzzle games, while TechRadar writer Gerald Lynch noted its absence on the SNES Classic, arguing that it should be included for its Tetris mode. Author Andy Slaven praised the NES versions of the included games and compared the compilation to Super Mario All-Stars.
