= Year of Luigi =

Celebration of fictional character Luigi

- Anniversary logo with Luigi from Super Mario Bros. (1985)
- Date: February 14, 2013 – March 18, 2014 (1 year, 1 month and 4 days)
- Type: Anniversary event
- Motive: 30th anniversary of Luigi
- Organized by: Nintendo
- Website: mario.nintendo.com

The Year of Luigi was the 30th-anniversary celebration of the fictional character Luigi. He was created by Japanese video game designer Shigeru Miyamoto for the 1983 arcade game Mario Bros. and has appeared frequently as a minor or supporting character in the Mario franchise since. Due to Nintendo's decision to develop Luigi's Mansion: Dark Moon and Mario & Luigi: Dream Team at the same time, they declared 2013 the Year of Luigi. According to Miyamoto, Nintendo staff members also had the urge to develop games focused on Luigi, and considered the character underrepresented compared to Mario. It was announced via Nintendo Direct on February 14, 2013, by Nintendo CEO Satoru Iwata and ended on March 18, 2014.

Games released in The Year of Luigi include Luigi's Mansion: Dark Moon, New Super Luigi U, and Dr. Luigi, all starring Luigi as the protagonist, and with little or no appearance of Mario. Mario & Luigi: Dream Team also made Luigi a large focus of the game. References to Luigi and to the Mario Bros. remix titled Luigi Bros., are in Super Mario 3D World. These games were received generally positively.

Nintendo released a wide array of Luigi-themed merchandise via Club Nintendo exclusives across the celebration, such as limited collectible pins, coins, a soundtrack selection, and an exclusive Nintendo 3DS XL in July. The company rebranded a Chicago "L" train and Clark/Lake station with Year of Luigi and New Super Luigi U promotion and released a parkour-themed mockumentary about Luigi, both in August. Canadian actor Danny Wells, who portrayed Luigi in The Super Mario Bros. Super Show!, died that November. In October 2019, Nintendo celebrated the "Month of Luigi" to promote Luigi's Mansion 3.

== History ==
Well, Luigi has been one of our characters for many years, but we've never really had much in the way of games that have Luigi in the starring role. He's had sort of a more prominent role in the Mario and Luigi series and there is one of those games coming out this year, but with that game and then with Luigi's Mansion: Dark Moon coming, we felt it was the time to make this the year of Luigi.

— Shigeru Miyamoto, 2013

During a February 2013 Nintendo Direct, the CEO of Nintendo Satoru Iwata, wearing Luigi's cap, announced that Nintendo would be observing the Year of Luigi to celebrate the 30th anniversary of the character's inception. In the Nintendo Direct, Nintendo announced Mario & Luigi: Dream Team, New Super Luigi U, and information about Luigi's Mansion: Dark Moon. According to Iwata, Nintendo often used Luigi as a supporting character behind his twin brother Mario, so the celebration would focus on Luigi as the primary character. According to Polygon and GameSpot interviews in March with Mario creator Shigeru Miyamoto, Nintendo "never really had much in the way of games that have Luigi in the starring role". He cited Luigi's global fan base and that many staff members at Nintendo had wanted to develop games focused exclusively on him because he is more timid than Mario. When they began development for Dark Moon and Dream Team, both of which use Luigi as a primary protagonist, they declared 2013 as the Year of Luigi.

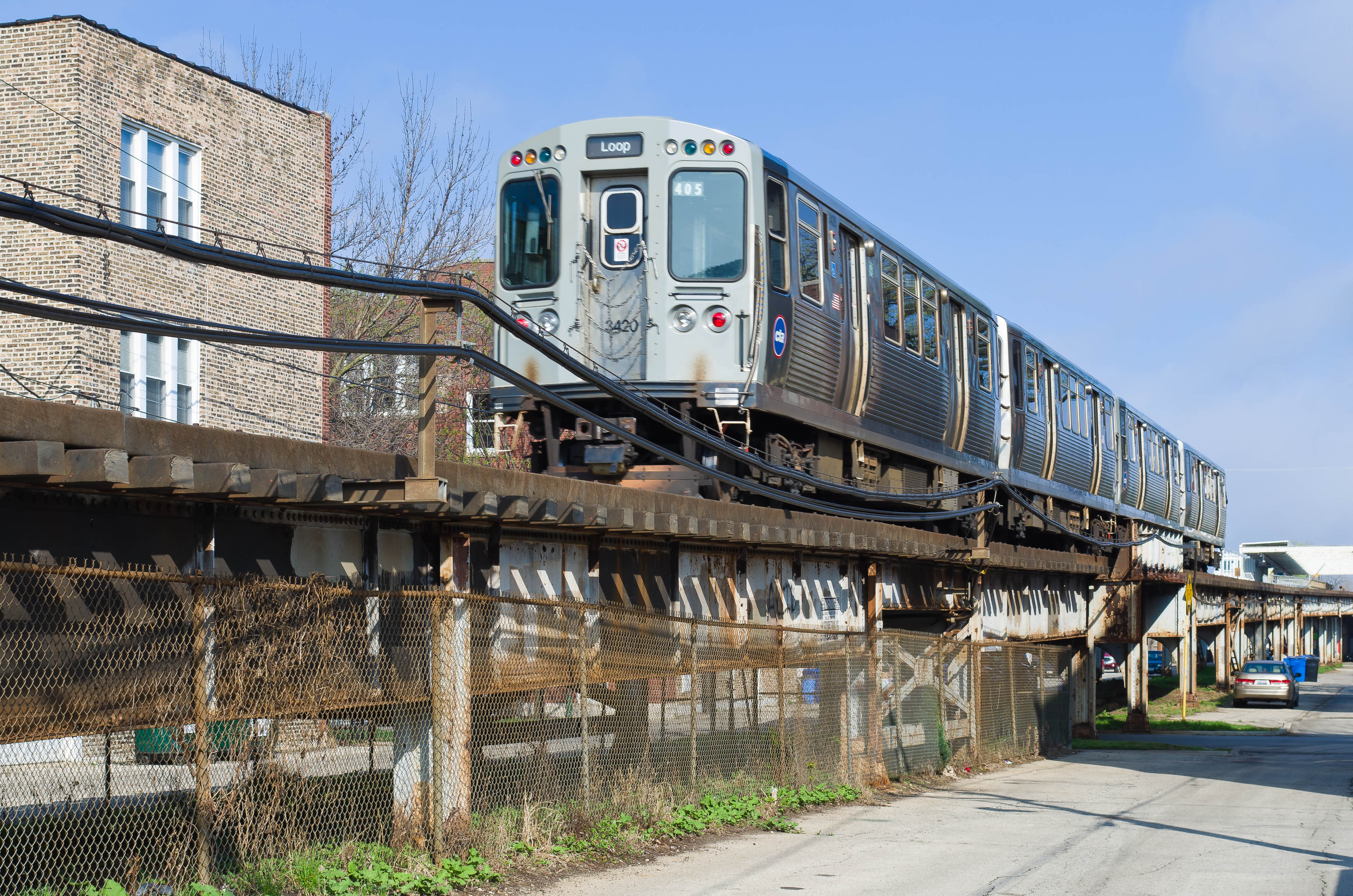
A Brown Line train on the Chicago "L" system (example shown) was redesigned with a Luigi theme.

In March 2013, Nintendo made three Miiverse forums—two about the Year of Luigi and one specifically for Dark Moon—for posts and drawings concerning the character. Some Nintendo employees, such as Takashi Tezuka, Yoshihito Ikebata, and Miyamoto, made Miiverse posts to encourage user interaction. This was Miyamoto's first Miiverse post. Later, on August 12, Nintendo partnered with the Chicago Transit Authority to temporarily redesign a Chicago "L" Brown Line train with a green color scheme and Luigi artwork for the celebration; the Brown Line was renamed the "Luigi Line" for the day. A Luigi costumed character was on that train to meet riders through the day. The design also included promotion for New Super Luigi U, and kiosks were placed at the Clark/Lake station with a playable demonstration. The Luigi-designed train remained in service through September 8. Also in August, Nintendo released the mockumentary Finding Luigi – Legend of Parkour on YouTube, opening with various interviews with parkour athletes who praise Luigi's popularity and skill in the parkour industry, then mysteriously vanish. Two men go on a quest to find and interview Luigi. The mockumentary justifies why Luigi jumps higher than Mario in New Super Luigi U and Super Mario 3D World.

On November 28, 2013, Canadian actor Danny Wells died in Toronto, Ontario at age 72. He voiced and acted in various films and television shows, including Luigi in The Super Mario Bros. Super Show! spanning 52 episodes. His death was mourned by critics.

In a December Nintendo Direct, Nintendo announced Dr. Luigi, was released in late December in North America and in mid-January internationally. When Siliconera asked Nintendo of America president Reggie Fils-Aimé if the Year of Luigi would end in 2013, he confirmed that Nintendo planned on releasing exclusive Luigi-themed content in the following year. February 18, 2014 was the one-year anniversary of The Year of Luigi, but Miyamoto declared on Miiverse that the celebration would continue until March 18, closing its three Miiverse forums. His final post there expressed thanks for the celebration's reception, and some posts were displayed on Nintendo's website. During and following the event, critics speculated future celebrations that could focus on other characters or franchises by Nintendo.

== Games ==
=== Full releases ===
==== Luigi's Mansion: Dark Moon ====
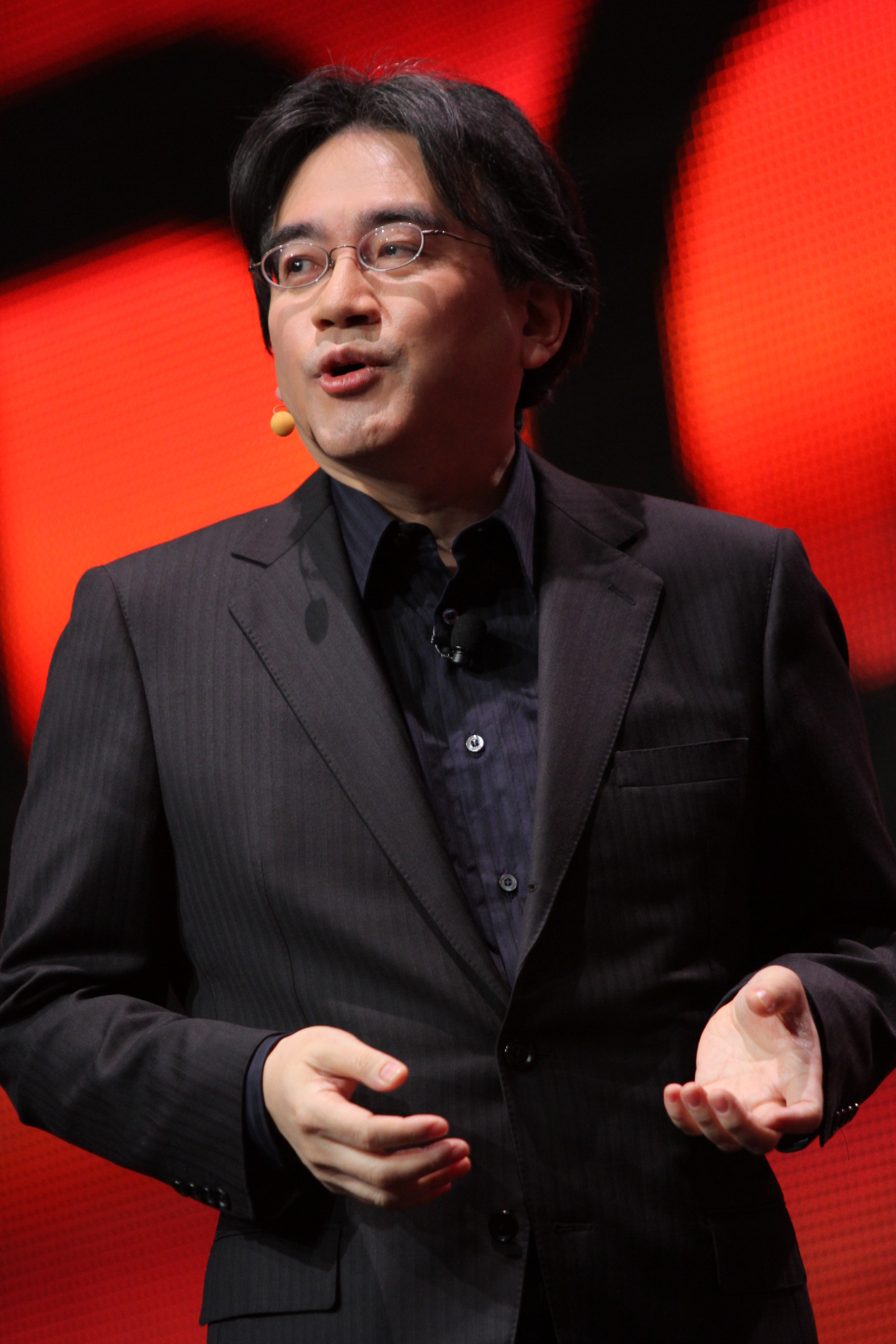
Satoru Iwata at GDC 2011

At the beginning of the February Nintendo Direct, Luigi's Mansion: Dark Moon received major announcements on its gameplay and new game-modes, marking the first Luigi-oriented game for the celebration. A Luigi's Mansion sequel was announced at E3 2011 tentatively titled Luigi's Mansion 2, and revealed the game and a 2012 holiday release date at E3 2012. The game was delayed to the first half of 2013 for an unspecified reason. In the February Direct, presented by Iwata, Miyamoto held a Poltergust machine from the Luigi's Mansion series. Iwata gave Miyamoto another Luigi cap, dubbed the two of them the "Luigi Brothers", and Miyamoto continued the announcement. The game was released on March 24 to coincide with the celebration. Iwata stated in an Iwata Asks interview with developer Next Level Games that Dark Moon will hopefully kick the Year of Luigi "off to a magnificent starting dash"–all attendees were also wearing Luigi caps. Miyamoto expressed appreciation in Next Level Game's work and its timing with the Year of Luigi, considering how a sequel to Luigi's Mansion was highly anticipated by fans.

In Dark Moon, Luigi is tasked by Professor E. Gadd to capture the ghosts invading the Evershade Valley complex, who have become hostile due to the effects of the Dark Moon crystal, which was shattered by King Boo. Luigi is equipped with the Poltergust 5000, a vacuum repurposed to capture ghosts, and Luigi captures ghosts occupying the mansions via mission-based levels. In a cooperative multiplayer game-mode, and players complete objectives on floors of the "ScareScraper" in a level-like fashion. Critical feedback for the game was positive, being praised for its worldbuilding and puzzle variety, Poltergust mechanics, and centralization on Luigi, and criticized for gameplay padding.

==== New Super Luigi U ====
Also featured in the Nintendo Direct was New Super Luigi U, downloadable content (DLC) for the 2012 Wii U game New Super Mario Bros. U. It originally served as an expansion pack that would be downloadable from the eShop at an unspecified date, and would include an additional 80 levels on top of the base game. The levels were designed to be much more difficult, so the time to complete them was made shorter so less experienced players would be encouraged to continue, according to producer Takashi Tezuka. At E3 2013, Nintendo announced that Mario would be completely omitted from New Super Luigi U and would be replaced by Nabbit, a now playable non-player character who originally appeared in New Super Mario Bros. U. In addition, Nintendo also announced that the expansion pass would be released as a separate physical purchase for a larger price and would be released the same time as its downloadable counterpart. The physical copy used a green box instead of the Wii U's traditional blue ones. Both retail variants were released July 13 and 26 in Japan and Europe respectively and August 25 in North America.

Gameplay of New Super Luigi U retains most aspects of New Super Mario Bros U. Instead of Mario, the player controls Luigi, who has a higher jump and less friction in the movement, but after completion the player can switch back to regular controlling. The new levels have a harder difficulty and a shorter time to complete them, and some are designed with Luigi-themed decoration. The game received generally positive reception, being praised for its level design and content size; critics also had mixed opinions on Luigi's handling, as well as its difficulty and the time allotted to complete levels.

==== Mario & Luigi: Dream Team ====
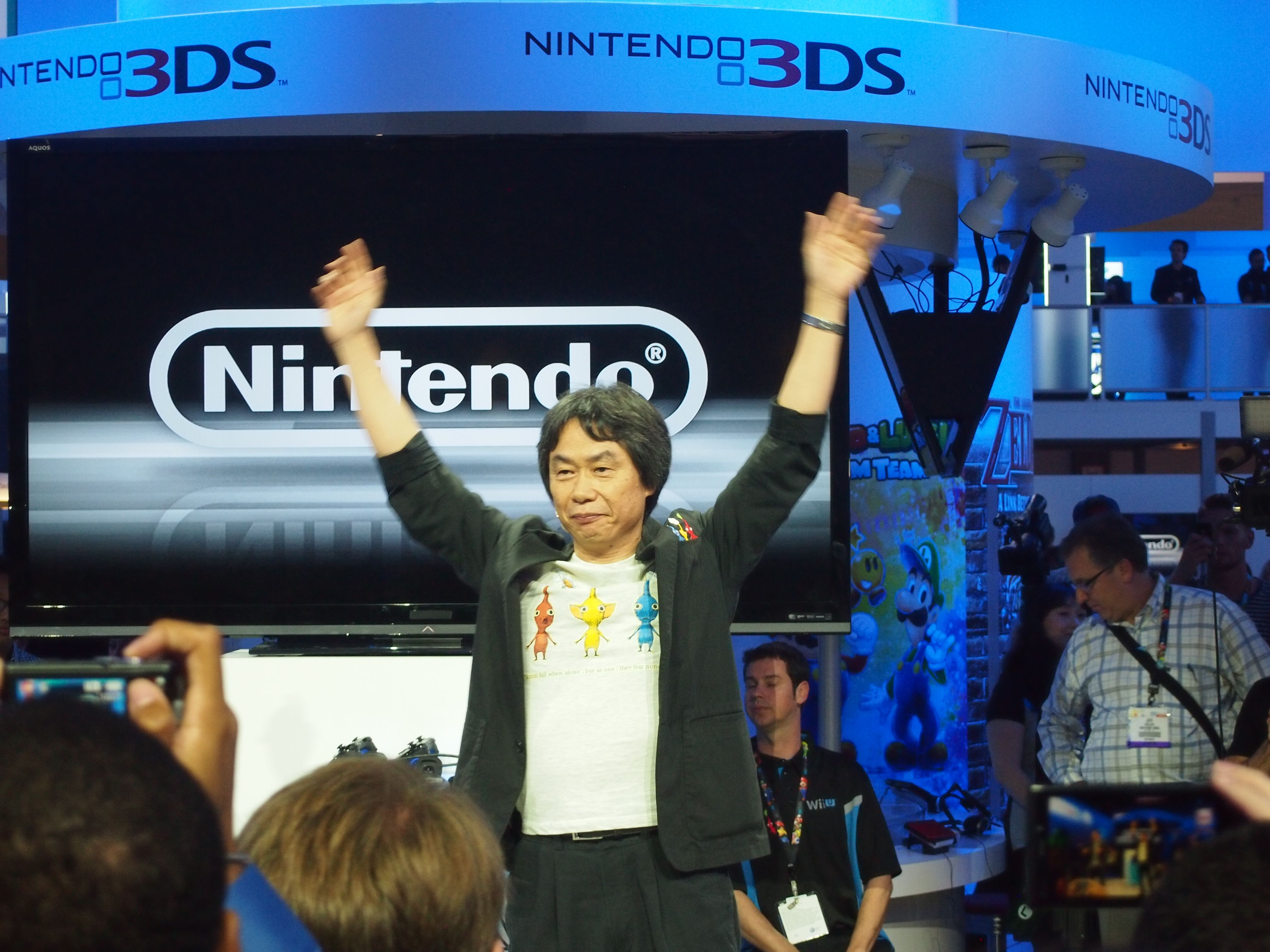
Shigeru Miyamoto at E3 2013; a demo kiosk for Dream Team can be seen in the background.

In the same Nintendo Direct, Nintendo announced the fourth installment in the Mario & Luigi series, Mario & Luigi: Dream Team, scheduled for a summer release. During the Direct, Iwata specified that the majority of the game would take place within Luigi's dream, where he "might not be as traditionally cowardly" to better centralize Luigi's role. The game released July 12 in Europe, the day after in Japan, and August 11 in North America. Alongside the release, a demo was made available on the Nintendo eShop. Due to the last entry in the series, Bowser's Inside Story, focusing primarily on Bowser instead of Mario and Luigi, series developer AlphaDream conceived ideas for another game focusing solely on Luigi. After conceptualizing the idea of "having a lot of Luigis on the screen that you could control and who would run around", they set Dream Team's setting within a dream to justify its inclusion. According to game director Akira Otani, AlphaDream used Luigi as the butt of gag jokes too often and wanted to equalize Luigi with Mario. In another Iwata Asks interview about Dream Team's development, Otani was surprised to see the Year of Luigi's announcement and was shocked Luigi was as old as he was, meaning AlphaDream's emphasis on Luigi was pure coincidence.

In his dreams, Luigi can be anyone — as brave and strong as his big bro. I wondered if the developer would take this opportunity to honor him seriously, and a few minutes in, I was immediately skeptical as he tripped over his own feet and others lobbed their usual ridicule. Before long, however, the game’s themes took precedence, and Luigi conjured a world where he finally belonged."

— Stephanie Carmichael, 2013 review

In Dream Team, Mario, Luigi, and Princess Peach are invited to vacation at Pi'illo island; when the trip goes awry and the three are put under threat, they investigate the island's central castle to investigate. When Luigi gets distracted and sleeps on a bed in the castle's artifact room, a "Dream Portal" opens up, and its hostile inhabitants kidnap Peach and wreak havoc on Pi'illo island. Mario sets out to retrieve the "Dream Stone" artifact to contain the inhabitants, which involves frequent use of Luigi's dreams to his advantage. Gameplay centralizes around Pi'illo island in an overworld fashion, with Luigi's dreams, the "Dream World", involving platforming elements. When Mario is in the Dream World, a sleeping Luigi can be physically interacted with to alter what happens in the Dream World; for example, making Luigi sneeze will create a gust of wind in the Dream World. Reception for Dream Team was positive, being praised for its writing, characters, and turn-based combat, and criticized for its plot length and use of backtracking. The game was also revered for its Dream World elements, especially the dynamic between the real-world Luigi and his more superior Dream World counterpart.

==== Dr. Luigi ====
The last full game is Dr. Luigi, which was announced via Nintendo Direct December 18 and released December 31 in North America and January 15 internationally the following year. The sixth entry in the Dr. Mario series, Dr. Luigi has four different modes: "Operation L", which uses L-shaped pills instead of traditional Dr. Mario pills; "Virus Buster", which uses the Wii U GamePad and stylus instead of standard button controls; multiplayer, which includes both local and online gameplay; and "Retro Remedy", which doesn't use any gimmicks and is rather unaltered Dr. Mario gameplay. Luigi replaces Mario, and stands on a pedestal that has a Year of Luigi theming. Critical reception was positive, being praised for the inventiveness of the Operation L gamemode and multiplayer features, and criticized for its lack of new content in comparison to the Dr. Mario predecessors, and some critics reevaluated the series as a whole to be non-inventive and too simple to hold interest.

=== Other ===
==== Super Mario 3D World ====
If a player who purchased Super Mario 3D World also had data for New Super Luigi U saved on their Wii U, they were given access to Luigi Bros.; (Note: Luigi Bros. could alternatively be unlocked by clearing the main game.) Luigi Bros. was accessible via the title screen of 3D World and featured gameplay identical to that of Mario Bros. but used Luigi as the main character instead of Mario. Nintendo also placed multiple 8-bit depictions of Luigi in hidden locations throughout 3D World.

== Merchandise and promotions ==
Coinciding with the release of Dark Moon, Nintendo began "Luigi’s 72 Hour Sale", during which their website was temporarily turned green and many games were put on sale. To encourage people to purchase the physical copy of New Super Luigi U, Nintendo posted a survey on the Nintendo Club America website; anyone who completed the survey received virtual currency and was also entered in a draw to win a pin depicting Luigi. 980 of these pins were given. In October, Nintendo released a collectible coin on the Club Nintendo Europe site. The coin was designed with the Year of Luigi logo and came packaged in a green felt bag. In July, Nintendo released an exclusive Nintendo 3DS XL depicting various Luigi's as he appears in Dream Team and a green color scheme; the handheld had a copy of Dream Team pre-installed. It released July 12 and 18 in Europe and Japan respectively, and August 11 in North America. Also in August, Nintendo Club received the purchasable "Year of Luigi Sound Selection", which contained song tracks from games Luigi had starred or been a part of, such as the original Luigi's Mansion. Similar to the 3DS XL bundle, a bundle of a Nintendo 3DS released in November with a cobalt blue color and had Dark Moon preinstalled on the console. In December, also on the Club Nintendo America and Europe cites, a diorama depicting Luigi, the Polterpup, and a ghost in a Dark Moon mansion setting was released. When the Year of Luigi ended Nintendo donated four collectible coins to Nintendo Life UK to give away to readers in a treasure hunt fashion.

== Legacy ==
2013 was an apparent financial failure for Nintendo, losing $457 million in total, primarily due to the poor reception of the Wii U and its games; however, an Internet meme spread in the end of the year that declared Luigi the cause of Nintendo's financial loss. Nintendo Life's Thomas Whitehead called the Year of Luigi a success in comparison: "[Luigi] led the rescue mission, ensuring damage control and smiling gaming faces with his humorous terror, clumsy mannerisms and awesome platforming athleticism. He bailed Mario out in this Year of Luigi, and we'd better not forget it."

=== Month of Luigi ===
In 2019, Nintendo declared October the "Month of Luigi", mainly to promote the new Luigi's Mansion 3. Coinciding with the promotion, Nintendo UK's Twitter account was temporarily renamed from "Super Mario UK" to "Super Luigi UK" and posted daily Luigi trivia. Luigi's Mansion 3 was released on October 31 at the technical end of the Month of Luigi, but daily Luigi trivia continued into mid-November.

== See also ==
- Super Mario Bros. 35th Anniversary
