= Dr. Mario World =

2019 video game

- App Store icon
- Developers: Nintendo EPD; Line Corporation; NHN Entertainment
- Publisher: Nintendo
- Directors: Kazuki Yoshihara; Soojin Lee
- Producer: Hideki Konno
- Designer: Seowon Kim
- Programmers: Naonori Oonishi; Hiroaki Hiruma; Taehoon Jun; Taewoo Kim; Young-soo Kim
- Series: Dr. Mario
- Engine: Unity
- Platforms: Android, iOS
- Release: July 10, 2019 – November 1, 2021 (2 years, 3 months, 3 weeks and 1 day)
- Genre: Puzzle
- Modes: Single-player, multiplayer

Dr. Mario World (Note: Japanese: ドクターマリオワールド, Hepburn: Dokutā Mario Wārudo) was a 2019 match-three mobile game developed and published by Nintendo in collaboration with Line Corporation and NHN Entertainment.

On July 28, 2021, Nintendo announced that the game's services would end on November 1, 2021 at 2 AM North American Eastern Standard Time. The game was shut down on the stated date and time, rendering the game completely unplayable.

== Gameplay ==
In Dr. Mario World, and similar to prior Dr. Mario games, the player removed viruses from the screen by matching their colors with that of a pill capsule. The player oriented a single pill capsule against an array of viruses and obstacles. As the pill began to drift upwards, the player could rotate and horizontally move the pill such that, when settled, the pill's color would match at least two similarly colored viruses in a vertical or horizontal direction. The level was complete when all viruses are removed.

The player was able to float multiple pills at once and even drag pills through obstacles to specific positions as long as the pill feasibly fit. Later levels added additional elements, such as shielded viruses and destructible blocks to complicate the removal of viruses. Other levels had additional requirements for completion, such as extracting hidden coins from blocks.

Upon filling a "skill meter", the player could activate a special ability once or twice in each level. Different special abilities were associated with the game's playable characters. For example, Dr. Mario could remove the entire bottom row on the game screen, Dr. Yoshi removed three on-screen items at random, and Dr. Peach could remove a full column. The player could also purchase power-ups through real-money microtransactions to instantaneously fill the skill meter. At the time of launch, ten playable characters were available, with Dr. Mario as the default character. Following the completion of the first five stages, the player could choose to continue using Dr. Mario, or they may have elected to switch to either Dr. Peach or Dr. Bowser. Players were also given the option to enlist "assistants" that provided the player with benefits during gameplay; for example, Pokey granted the player a 10% chance of earning an additional 3 seconds in timed stages, and Koopa Troopa granted 50 bonus points for each remaining capsule at the conclusion of a stage. Additional doctors and assistants were acquired at random using either coins accumulated during gameplay or diamonds purchased with real-world currency.

Similar to other mobile match-three games, such as Candy Crush, the game was monetized through timers, currencies, and purchasable digital items. For example, the player used "hearts" to play a level, which replenish over time. The player could use coins and diamonds to purchase new characters/abilities, power-ups, and bonus pill capsules. The player received coins for completing daily activities. Diamonds packs were purchased in exchange for real-world money through the app store.

The game had a simple single-player campaign and a "versus" multiplayer mode. Dr. Mario World required a constant Internet connection.

== Development ==
Nintendo announced the game on February 1, 2019, with a planned release for early summer of that year. It was eventually released for Android and iOS mobile platforms in 59 territories on July 9, 2019. In July 2020, to celebrate the 30th anniversary of the original Dr. Mario game for the NES, a 8-bit sprite of Dr. Mario was released as a playable character.

In July 2021, Nintendo announced that they would be shutting down Dr. Mario World in November of the same year, with diamond packs no longer available for purchase from that date onwards. After October 31, 2021, opening the game displays a message saying that the service has shut down. A website entitled Dr. Mario World Memories was then created to view player progress before the game was shut down.

== Reception ==
Reception

Aggregate score
Aggregator	Score
Metacritic	58/100

Review scores
Publication	Score
Destructoid	6/10
Game Informer	8.75/10
Jeuxvideo.com	15/20
Nintendo Life	8/10
Pocket Gamer	1.5/5

Dr. Mario World received "mixed or average reviews", according to review aggregator website Metacritic. Polygon reported not feeling forced to spend real money through the game's monetization mechanics. Destructoid also criticized the monetization model, writing, "It's a shame Nintendo cut and ran with microtransactions after one misstep, their first, no less, in the mobile market." Game Informer found the gameplay to be addictive despite the monetization model and wrote more positively, giving the game 8.75 out of 10. Nintendo Life called the title "a game of two halves", heavily praising the multiplayer component while criticizing issues present in the single-player mode.

Within the first three days of the game's launch, Dr. Mario World had over two million downloads and US$100,000 spent.
