= New Super Luigi U =

2013 video game

- Packaging artwork
- Developer: Nintendo EAD
- Publisher: Nintendo
- Director: Masataka Takemoto
- Producers: Takashi Tezuka; Hiroyuki Kimura
- Designers: Shigeyuki Asuke; Daiki Iwamoto; Ryutaro Kanno
- Artist: Masanobu Sato
- Composers: Shiho Fujii; Mahito Yokota
- Series: Luigi, Super Mario
- Platforms: Wii U Nintendo Switch
- Release: June 19, 2013: DLC; JP: June 19, 2013; WW: June 20, 2013; AU: June 21, 2013; Retail; JP: July 13, 2013; EU: July 26, 2013; AU: July 27, 2013; NA: August 25, 2013; Nintendo Switch; WW: January 11, 2019
- Genre: Platform
- Modes: Single-player, multiplayer

New Super Luigi U (Note: Japanese: New スーパールイージ U, Hepburn: Nyū Sūpā Ruīji Yū) is a 2013 platform game developed by Nintendo for the Wii U. It is a standalone expansion pack for New Super Mario Bros. U (2012), part of the Super Mario series. The plot and game mechanics remain identical to New Super Mario Bros. U, but Luigi replaces Mario as the protagonist. Luigi jumps higher and has less ground friction than Mario, and every level is redesigned to increase the difficulty level. The expansion adds Nabbit, a non-player character from New Super Mario Bros. U, as an invincible playable character.

Nintendo's goal was to challenge preconceived notions of downloadable content (DLC) and make New Super Luigi U a game large enough to stand on its own. The developers sought to differentiate it from New Super Mario Bros. 2's (2012) DLC. The increased difficulty served to challenge series veterans, but levels were shortened to encourage less experienced players. Luigi was made the primary focus due to the Year of Luigi marketing campaign; New Super Luigi U was branded to coincide with it. It was purchasable as DLC for New Super Mario Bros. U, as a standalone game, and as a bundle with the main game. It was also included with the Nintendo Switch port, New Super Mario Bros. U Deluxe, in 2019.

New Super Luigi U was announced in a February 2013 Nintendo Direct; digital and retail versions were released between June and August. Nintendo took multiple routes to promote the expansion and Year of Luigi, including a partnership with the Chicago Transit Authority and a parkour-themed mockumentary. New Super Luigi U received positive reviews; critics praised the difficulty and level design, but criticized Luigi's control scheme as unbalanced with the difficulty change. The multiplayer and addition of Nabbit received mixed opinions. Debut sales were overshadowed by Pikmin 3, but the expansion sold 3.07 million copies by 2020, making it the eighth-best-selling Wii U game.

== Gameplay ==
Gameplay of four-player multiplayer; a Star Coin can be seen floating at the top of the screen as well as a Luigi topiary that stands to the right of the screen

Once purchased, New Super Luigi U is selectable from the New Super Mario Bros. U (NSMBU) main menu. The main storyline is nearly identical to that of NSMBU, with the omission of Mario. The player controls Luigi with the goal of traversing each level from left to right to reach the end, identified with a flag pole. Throughout the levels are various enemies and hazards to hinder progression. Levels also contain power-ups that give Luigi new abilities when collected; for example, the Fire Flower allows Luigi to throw fireballs and the Flying Squirrel Suit allows Luigi to glide midair. Each level contains three "Star Coins" that serve as collectible items. Levels are split up into eight "worlds", and encounters with one of eight Koopalings occur within them. The levels are selected on an overworld map with branching paths. Compared to NSMBU, levels are redesigned to be more difficult and do not contain checkpoints, but are considerably shorter in length; each level gives the player 100 seconds to complete it. Using the Wii U GamePad, the player can use its touchscreen to place down temporary platforms to stand on at their discretion.

Although retaining the same control scheme as Mario, Luigi himself has less friction and slides easier, and also jumps higher and moves slower midair. Once the game is completed the player has the option to turn these physics changes off. Replacing Mario is Nabbit, originally a non-player character who appeared in NSMBU as an antagonist. Nabbit is invulnerable to enemy damage and steadily gains extra lives over time, but in return cannot use power-ups. Two other characters are also playable, yellow- and blue-colored Toads, who retain the same physics from NSMBU. Each character can be played by an individual player in up to four-person multiplayer.

== Development ==
New Super Luigi U was developed by Nintendo EAD, the developers of New Super Mario Bros. U. The downloadable content (DLC) was made to emphasize the character Luigi due to the Year of Luigi, a marketing campaign commemorating the 30th anniversary of his introduction in Mario Bros. (1983). The concept for a Luigi-oriented DLC was conceived by producer Takashi Tezuka. Tezuka stated that the game's primary goal was to "change what people think of DLC." To help make the DLC distinct from that of NSMBU, various developers were brought in from the New Super Mario Bros. 2 team to design new gimmicks that did not overlap with the base game.

=== Concept ===
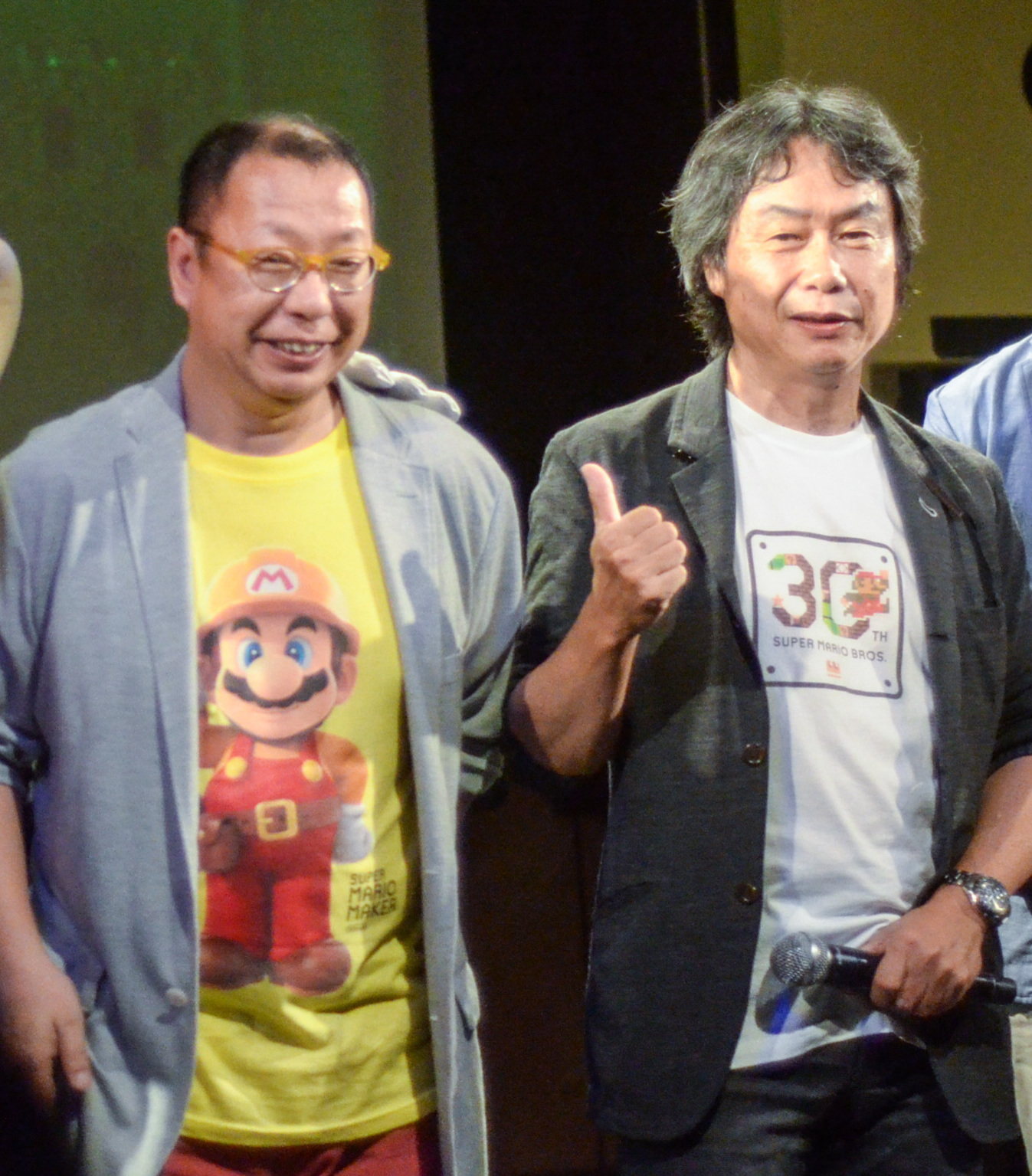
Producer Takashi Tezuka (left) with Shigeru Miyamoto (right) in 2015

According to Tezuka, the developers originally considered ideas for DLC that were much smaller than the final product, and settled on making more playable courses for the Boost Rush game mode, similar to the DLC found in New Super Mario Bros. 2. Ideas for gimmicks found within the new levels were conceptualized fairly quickly; the similarity between the new DLC and New Super Mario Bros. 2 "began to bother" Tezuka. When he requested game director Masataka Takemoto to start over from scratch with a new concept, he accepted the offer because he believed that fans would query why the DLC was not included in the base game. Takemoto's new goal was to create a DLC larger than New Super Mario Bros. 2, and waited for its DLC to release to test how it would be received by its audience. When the DLC for New Super Mario Bros. 2 was released, to their expectations, fans were disappointed that the content was too basic to be held behind a paid barrier.

When development for New Super Mario Bros. U DLC recommenced, they experimented with the concept of levels that "had extremely short courses but increased difficulty." They did this because they considered that players who completed the game would be looking for a more difficult challenge, but making each level the same length as the base game would make the experience "exhausting". Takemoto viewed the length change from a different angle; he noticed how each subsequent release in the Super Mario series had levels that were longer than the last. He aimed to make a game that was similar in playtime to Super Mario Bros. 3 for easier accessibility. To get players to post about New Super Luigi U on the social platform Miiverse, they emphasized adding at least one "landmark" in each level, such as Luigi pixel art, stickers, and Luigi-shaped objects in the background, to encourage the player to post their findings. From there, other players could spend time trying to look for them. Tezuka was originally opposed to a physical release because the game was designed to appeal to players who had already completed New Super Mario Bros. U. He changed his mind after considering an audience that had never played the game and could use the DLC as a starting point.

=== Characters ===
"I asked a programmer to make something as a test, and his first reaction was 'Are you really going to do this with Nabbit?!' But when he actually made it, before he even showed it to me, I got a phone call from that programmer, who was overjoyed, saying, 'It feels so refreshing to use Nabbit! Even the way he walks around the course selection screen is great!' When I heard that, I knew I had to keep pushing for Nabbit!"

— Director Masataka Takemoto speaking about Nabbit, 2013 Iwata Asks interview

When Tezuka first suggested Luigi to be the centralized character, Takemoto first replied, "What are you talking about?!" When Tezuka persisted and requested the idea again a few days later, Takemoto took the idea into consideration; he found that making Luigi the main character would further solidify the game as a separate experience. With the change came the additions of a new control set for Luigi, and certain level concepts where standard controls made completion difficult became easier.

After Tezuka convinced Takemoto to omit Mario from the game entirely, other options for a replacement were considered. The original idea was to include a third Toad but was later decided against because it made multiplayer too disorienting. Princess Peach was never considered because she "is off somewhere far away in need of saving." After considering enemy options Takemoto settled on Nabbit, a character who first appeared in New Super Mario Bros. U as a non-player character. He asked a specific programmer to create a prototype; he was originally skeptical about the idea but was shocked to find it worked well, calling Takemoto about his discoveries before he even viewed it in person. They also considered and incorporated the ability for him to dodge enemies altogether as he does in New Super Mario Bros. U, which ended up being included in the final version; they found the idea to be a good feature for beginners or less experienced players. This fell in line with one of Shigeru Miyamoto's philosophies for game design: "An idea is a single solution that solves multiple issues at once."

== Marketing and release ==
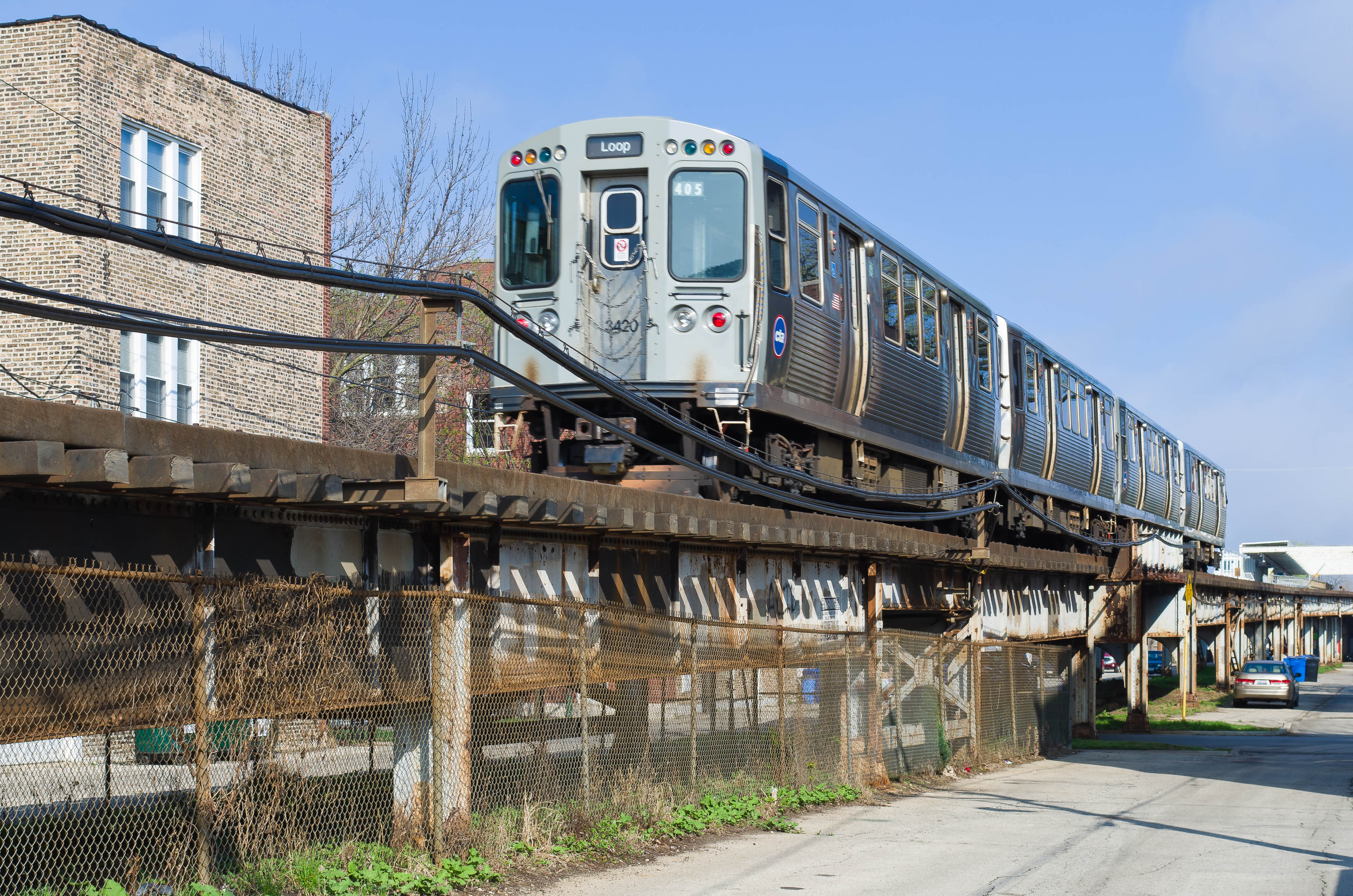
A Brown Line train was redesigned with New Super Luigi U artwork in August to promote the game.

The game was announced in a February 2013 Nintendo Direct, coinciding with the announcements of Luigi's Mansion: Dark Moon and Mario & Luigi: Dream Team. It was presented by Nintendo CEO Satoru Iwata; no release date and price were mentioned as it was a long way from completion. More details were revealed at E3 2013; Nintendo announced that Mario would be omitted from the DLC entirely and would be replaced with Nabbit. They also announced that the DLC would release not only for the Wii U Nintendo eShop but as a standalone physical copy as well, with a green box instead of blue. The eShop variant released June 19 in Japan and the following day worldwide, and the retail version released July 13 and 26 in Europe and Japan respectively, and August 25 in North America. The following November saw the release of a Wii U bundle that contained NSMBU and New Super Luigi U. New Super Luigi U, alongside the original base game, were bundled together and re-released for the Nintendo Switch with other changes to gameplay as New Super Mario Bros. U Deluxe in 2019.

On July 27, Takemoto made an post on Miiverse that Nintendo would be holding a challenge for its players; the goal was to complete the main story mode while collecting the fewest coins possible. In the month after release, Nintendo partnered with the Chicago Transit Authority to rebrand one of their Chicago "L" Brown Line systems into the "Luigi Line"; the train was redesigned with a green color scheme and contained Year of Luigi artwork and other New Super Luigi U promotional material. Kiosk booths were placed on the second floor of the Clark/Lake station so passersby could demo the game, and a Luigi costumed character was a frequent rider. The promotion remained from August 12 to September 8, after which it returned to normal. Throughout the promotion the official Nintendo of America Twitter account was changed to appear as if it were Luigi's, and was used to take pictures of Luigi visiting different places in Chicago, Illinois. The same month also saw the release of the mockumentary Finding Luigi – Legend of Parkour, which released for Nintendo's official YouTube channel. The video depicts Luigi as a "legend of parkour" who has mysteriously vanished from the industry, and the film crew attempts to meet with an on-the-run Nabbit to learn of his current whereabouts.

== Reception ==
Reception

Aggregate score
Aggregator	Score
Metacritic	77/100

Review scores
Publication	Score
4Players	83/100
Eurogamer	6/10
Game Informer	8/10
GameSpot	8.5/10
GamesRadar+	3.5/5
IGN	7.3/10
Nintendo Life	8/10
PCMag	3.5/5
Polygon	7/10
USgamer	3.5/5

New Super Luigi U received "generally favorable reviews" according to review aggregator website Metacritic, receiving a 77/100 based on 59 critical reviews.

Most critics praised the game's difficulty, with Jan Wobbeking of 4Players comparing the game's difficulty to that of the Japanese-exclusive release Super Mario Bros.: The Lost Levels. Nintendo Life's Thomas Whitehead appreciated the spike in difficulty and lauded the use of limited time and more intense platforming to do so. They originally found the jumps flutter to be unnecessary but the change ultimately became "second nature". Polygon reviewer Phillip Kollar considered the game "the most difficult Mario content that Nintendo has created in decades." Some praised it as a new challenge for players after completing NSMBU, but only with Super Mario series veterans in mind; IGN's Vince Ingenito called the game a "CliffsNotes version of a great fast-paced 2D platformer", and found the game overall to be a unique twist on the standard Super Mario formula. In opposition, Kollar noted a lack of attention to new players, and although the game was balanced towards the player, it was too "relentless" to encourage more attempts. Writing for Eurogamer, Chris Schilling increasingly found frustration in the time spent between dying and opening a level, and negatively compared the experience to Super Meat Boy, which resets the player immediately after failure. 4Players highlighted a handful of posts made to Miiverse, where users verbalized their frustrations with the game's difficulty. Despite the changes, GameSpot felt the experience was too similar to NSMBU.

The level design was lauded, but some criticized other small annoyances that hurt the overall experience. Ingenito noted that the 100-second time limit gave a strong "psychological effect" and credited the decreasing timer to many of his mistakes. Kollar enjoyed the limited time but was ultimately frustrated that it left little room to play at their own pace or to view the game's graphics; VentureBeat's Jeff Grubb shared similar opinions. Schilling considered the level design challenging but uninteresting, due to the fact that most had only one direct path to completion and did not give the player much freedom to explore. Henry Gilbert of GamesRadar called the shorter levels "impressively compact", and considered the shortened concept to be a positive with Super Mario series veterans in mind. Whitehead applauded the gimmicks found within levels and named memorable events that they considered were Nintendo holding back their creativity. USGamer's Jeremy Parish considered the game to be frustrating, not because of the intentional difficulty, but other various changes to Luigi's control did not add up well to the precise and quick-paced level design. They considered the concept to go against the standard Super Mario formula of being able to explore each level as they please. They found the game overall to be too demanding and preferred the DLC found in New Super Mario Bros. 2.

Luigi's control scheme was mostly criticized for its impreciseness. Schilling criticized Luigi's controls, not due to their function, but because they did not pair well with the level design, which focused on precision and therefore did not emphasize Luigi's slippery movement. He appreciated the ability to revert controls post-completion but called the overall concept "a green peg in a red hole." Game Informer reviewer Dan Ryckert struggled to get used to the dynamic shift in gameplay from the base game, but overall enjoyed the experience. 4Players noted difficulty in navigating Luigi through tight platforming sessions, but the higher jump helped to avoid failure. Ingenito derided the level design for its failure to justify Luigi's movement, and although it did increase difficulty it was not in a fair sense. They appreciated the higher jumps, however, and often exploited them to a maximum. In contrast, Kollar felt the levels matched Luigi's moveset well and merely took time to get used to.

Critics were also opposed to the multiplayer, with mixed opinions directed towards Nabbit. Ryckert considered Nabbit a helpful addition geared towards new players who would not be comfortable with the increased difficulty. Gilbert criticized the multiplayer; they felt the game focused primarily on single-player and most levels were unmanageable with four players participating simultaneously. They also believed Nabbit caused "unexpected problems" by being unbalanced in comparison to the other characters. Whitehead appreciated the use of Nabbit as a more approachable selection but was overall "misguided", and due to the addition of unmanageable multiplayer, suggested using NSMBU's multiplayer instead.

== Sales ==
New Super Luigi U debuted the same week as Pikmin 3, another highly anticipated title by Nintendo that was also released exclusively for the Wii U, overshadowing New Super Luigi U in comparison. Japanese sales for the retail copy totaled 24,881, about 1,000 copies behind Tomodachi Collection: New Life and a roughly third the number of Pikmin 3. By the end of August, North American sales reached 120,000. By May 2014, New Super Luigi U reached 1.76 million sales, although 2014 was a financial failure for Nintendo and the Wii due to the poor sales of the Wii U console; Nintendo had a net loss of $457 million. As of 2020 the game has sold 3.07 million copies and is the eighth-best-selling game on the Wii U.
