= Dr. Mario 64 =

2001 video game

- North American box art
- Developer: Nintendo R&D1
- Publisher: Nintendo
- Directors: Hitoshi Yamagami; Yoshiyuki Kato
- Producers: Genyo Takeda; Junichi Yakahi
- Designers: Hitoshi Yamagami; Kazushi Maeda; Yohei Fujigawa
- Composer: Seiichi Tokunaga
- Series: Dr. Mario
- Platforms: Nintendo 64, iQue Player
- Release: Nintendo 64: NA: April 9, 2001; iQue Player: CHN: November 18, 2003
- Genre: Puzzle
- Modes: Single-player, multiplayer

Dr. Mario 64 is a 2001 tile-matching action puzzle game developed and published by Nintendo for the Nintendo 64. The game is an enhanced remake of Dr. Mario, which was originally released for the NES and Game Boy consoles in 1990, and is based around characters from the 2000 Game Boy Color game Wario Land 3. The game's soundtrack was composed by Seiichi Tokunaga, featuring arrangements of classic Dr. Mario tunes and new compositions. The game was released in North America on April 9, 2001.

The game received a Japanese release as part of the Nintendo Puzzle Collection compilation, released for the GameCube in 2003. The game was re-released on the Nintendo Classics service in October 2021, marking its first release in PAL territories.

The game received average reviews.

== Gameplay ==
Gameplay screenshot

Like its predecessor, Dr. Mario 64 is a falling block tile-matching video game. The playing field is represented on-screen as a medicine bottle populated with viruses of three colors: red, blue, and yellow. The main objective of the game to clear the playing field of all the viruses using two-colored medical capsules dropped into the bottle. The player manipulates the capsules as they fall, moving them left or right and rotating such that they are positioned alongside the viruses and any existing capsules. When four or more capsule halves or viruses of the same colour are aligned in horizontal or vertical configurations, they are removed from play. The player receives a game over if the playing field fills up with capsules such that they obstruct the bottle's narrow neck. Points are awarded when viruses are destroyed.

There are several single-player modes present in the game:

- Classic - This mode features a similar set-up and design to the original Dr. Mario game.
- Story - In this mode, the player may take control of either Dr. Mario or Wario to track down the stolen Megavitamins, battling computer players on the way.
- Vs. Computer - In this mode, the player may battle against the computer as any character the player has played as or fought against.
- Flash - In this mode, the player must eliminate three particular flashing viruses faster than the computer can.
- Marathon - This mode consists of a never-ending rising field of viruses which does not end until the player quits or loses.
- Score Attack - In this mode, the player is given three minutes to clear all of the viruses as well as get a high score.

A multiplayer mode also allows up to four players to compete at once in Classic, Flash, or Score Attack gameplay.

== Plot ==
The flu season has come about, and it is Dr. Mario's duty to use his Megavitamins to heal the people of the land. However, Wario, wanting to sell the pills to get rich, attempts to steal the Megavitamins, but to no avail. Afterwards, Mad Scienstein steals the Megavitamins under orders from Rudy the Clown, and both Dr. Mario and Wario give chase. Throughout their adventure, both of them meet up with many creatures from Wario Land 3. Most of the time the fights that emerge are really misunderstandings; for example, the player may accidentally bump into a creature, who gets angry and retaliates.

Dr. Mario and Wario follow Mad Scienstein to Rudy's castle, where they fight Rudy to take back the vitamins. If Dr. Mario wins, he realizes Rudy only wanted the Megavitamins to cure his cold, and willingly heals him before heading home. If Wario wins, he once again attempts to claim the Megavitamins, but Mad Scienstein grabs them first and escapes, with Wario giving chase.

If the game is completed on Normal mode or higher without using a continue, a bonus battle will occur after defeating Rudy. In Wario's story, Dr. Mario accidentally swallows the Megavitamins to become Metal Mario. In Dr. Mario's story, Wario consumes the Megavitamins, becoming Vampire Wario.

== Reception ==
Reception

Aggregate scores
Aggregator	Score
GameRankings	70.03%
Metacritic	71 / 100

Review scores
Publication	Score
Electronic Gaming Monthly	6.8/10 (Note: Electronic Gaming Monthly's review was by three critics that scored Dr. Mario 64 differently: 7/10, 7.5/10 and 6/10.)
Game Informer	8.5/10
GamePro	3.875/5 (Note: GamePro gave Dr. Mario 64 a 4.5/5 for fun factor, 5/5 for control, and two 3/5 ratings for graphics and sound.)
GameRevolution	C
GameSpot	7/10
IGN	5/10
N64 Magazine	43%
NGamer	72/100
Nintendo Power	4/5

Dr. Mario 64 in all of its various permutations was voted #76 in the Top 100 Games of All Time poll published by Game Informer in August 2001. IGN criticized the game for being "more of the same" and gave it a middling score of 5 out of 10. GameSpot gave the game 7 out of 10, summarizing that "Dr. Mario is a legitimate and satisfying puzzle game that is executed rather nicely in this four-player-focused package." It was a runner-up for GameSpot's annual "Best Nintendo 64 Game" award, which went to Paper Mario.
