= Dr. Mario Online Rx =

2008 video game

- Title screen
- Developer: Arika
- Publisher: Nintendo
- Directors: Hiroyasu Hashidate; Takamasa Hori; Kazuki Yoshihara
- Producers: Ichirou Mihara; Hitoshi Yamagami
- Designers: Hiroshi Okuda; Akira Nishitani
- Programmer: Shinichi Masuda
- Artists: Tatsuya Ushiroda; Takuma Yano; Jun Hosoba; Takayoshi Matsui
- Composer: Masaru Tajima
- Series: Dr. Mario
- Platform: WiiWare
- Release: JP: March 25, 2008; PAL: May 20, 2008; NA: May 26, 2008
- Genre: Puzzle
- Modes: Single-player, multiplayer

Dr. Mario Online Rx, (Note: Known in Japan as Dr. Mario & Saikin Bokumetsu (Dr. MARIO & 細菌撲滅; lit. Dr. Mario & Bacteria Eradication)) stylized as Dr. Mario Online ℞ and released in PAL regions as Dr. Mario & Germ Buster, is a puzzle video game starring Dr. Mario. It was one of the WiiWare launch games in Japan, Europe, and Australia, and was released in 2008 on March 25 for Japan, on May 20 for Europe and Australia, and for North America on May 26.

The game received average reviews, with praise towards its gameplay and online mode.

== Gameplay ==
As with other Dr. Mario games, players must manipulate pills to destroy colored viruses in the game area. Dr. Mario Online Rx features versions of the Nintendo DS title Brain Age 2's mini-games called Virus Buster and Germ Buster, which uses the pointer function of the Wii Remote to move pills, and allows up to four players to participate cooperatively.

The title supports the now defunct Nintendo Wi-Fi Connection service, which allowed players to compete with one another over the Internet. Players can use Mii characters or Dr. Mario during gameplay.

== Features ==
A majority of features from previous installments, such as the virus and speed levels, are present in Dr. Mario Online Rx. Players played online against another with only one copy, as an online-play demo could be sent akin to DS Download Play. Vs. Mode could also be played offline, if desired. Unlike Dr. Mario 64, Online Rx lacks the ability to play with four players, instead only allowing up to 2 players in Vs. Mode.

Several features in this game previously appeared in Dr. Mario 64, including the four musical tracks: "Fever", "Chill", "Cube", and "Que Que" (the latter two tracks are now named "Cough" and "Sneeze"). The music can be randomly selected or turned off. Flash Mode, which challenges the player(s) to clear just three flashing viruses among many, also returns from Dr. Mario 64.

Virus Buster, previously seen as a mini-game in Brain Age 2 has more customization than the original. Whereas the original only had Easy, Normal, and Hard as options, this version allows to adjust virus level and music as well. Remixed versions of "Fever" and "Chill" are present in this mode. Virus Buster can be played alone or with others, with up to four players. Instead of being controlled directly with the D-pad, they are guided with the Wii Remote pointer.

In single player mode, a player can select to start the game at level 20. After winning level 20, levels 21, 22, and 23 increment by four viruses. Level 24 and beyond contain 99 viruses. After 99 levels, gameplay can continue but the game does not progress past level 99 and the player is presented with only the "Try Again" and "Quit" menu options.

== Reception ==
Reception

Aggregate score
Aggregator	Score
Metacritic	72/100

Review scores
Publication	Score
Eurogamer	7/10
GameDaily	8/10
Gamekult	6/10
GamesRadar+	6/10
IGN	8.5/10
Jeuxvideo.com	7/20
Nintendo Life	7/10
Nintendo World Report	6/10
Official Nintendo Magazine	83%
PALGN	7/10

The game received "mixed or average reviews" according to the review aggregation website Metacritic.

IGN called the main game "timeless" and the new Virus Buster mode "chaotically awesome". However they were let down by the fact that the main Dr. Mario mode only supported up to 2 players (where some earlier games had supported up to 4) and that Virus Buster was not playable online. Additionally, N-Europe called it "the same Dr. Mario that we know and love" with "solid and functional graphics" and addictive gameplay. GamePro said, "Playing Dr. Mario Online RX for an hour or so virtually guarantees a smile and good mood to follow. Precious few full-price Wii games are that much fun, and a $10 game that delivers and that every single member of your family is likely to enjoy playing - is frankly a bargain." (Note: GamePro gave the game three 4/5 scores for graphics, sound, and fun factor, and 5/5 for control.)

In contrast, GamesRadar+ called it a "slightly awkward puzzler" that "just isn't addictive enough to make you care" and likened it to "Puyo Puyo's in-bred cousin". However, they praised the online multiplayer functionality and enjoyed its clean presentation, with the exception of the music.
