= List of Mario role-playing games =

Mario role-playing games
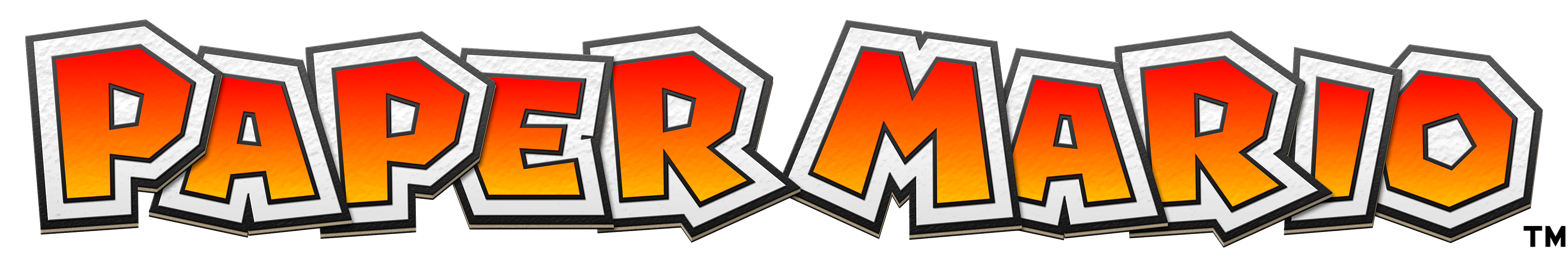
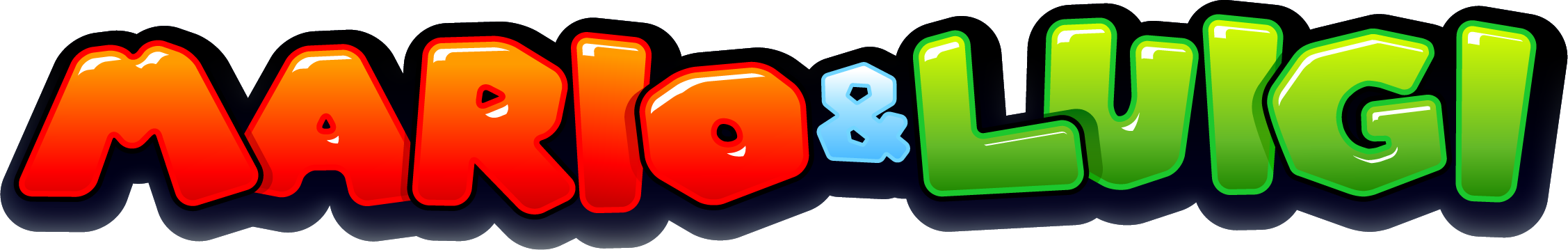
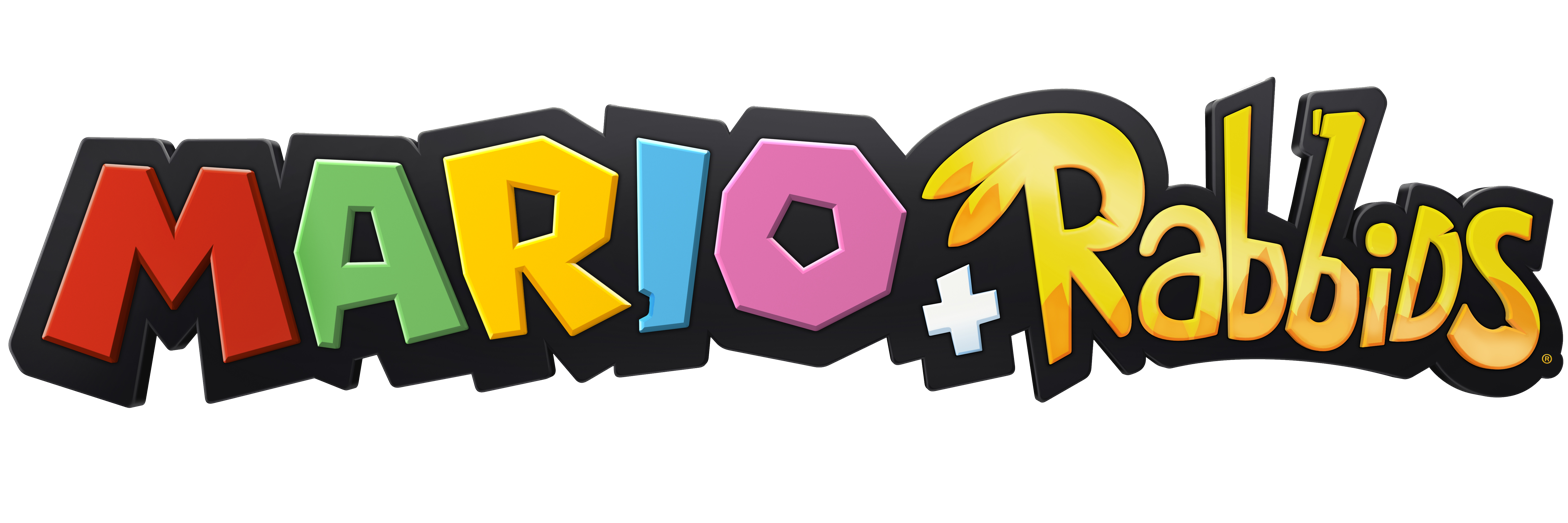
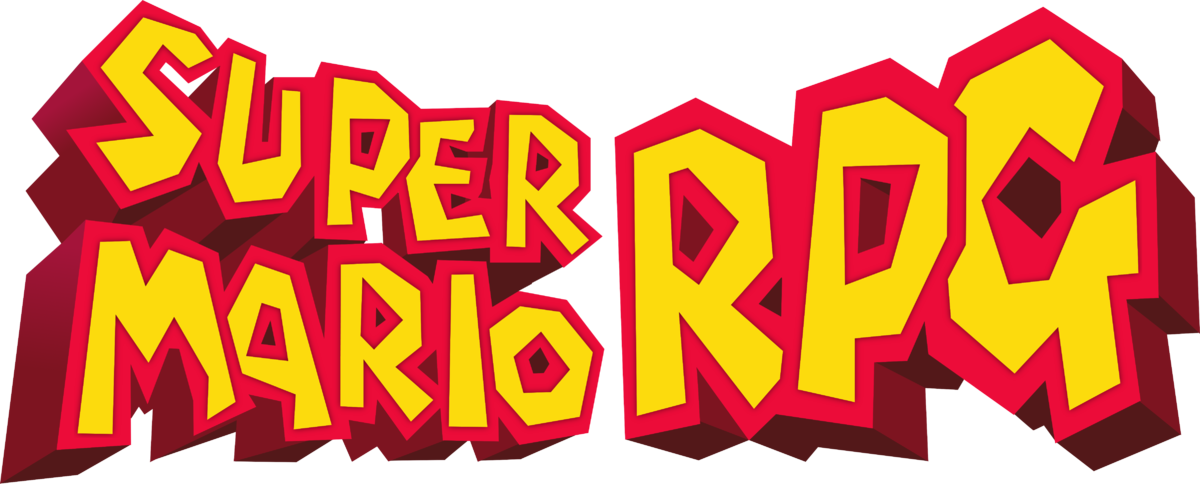
- From top to bottom: The Paper Mario, Mario & Luigi and Mario + Rabbids series logos, and the logo header of Super Mario RPG
- Genre: Role-playing
- Developers: Square; Intelligent Systems; AlphaDream; Ubisoft Milan; Ubisoft Paris; Acquire
- Publishers: Nintendo; Ubisoft
- Platforms: Super NES; Nintendo 64; Game Boy Advance; GameCube; Nintendo DS; Wii; Nintendo 3DS; Wii U Nintendo Switch

The Mario franchise, which originated as a series of platform games, has inspired a variety of role-playing video games released on multiple Nintendo video game consoles. All games feature Mario as the protagonist, who is often accompanied by one or more playable characters, with the goal of defeating the main antagonist, primarily Bowser. The first role-playing game in the franchise, Super Mario RPG (1996), was developed by Square for the Super NES. The two primary sub-series, Paper Mario and Mario & Luigi, follow conventions established in the original game.

The Paper Mario series is developed by Intelligent Systems and published by Nintendo, the first game being Paper Mario which was released for the Nintendo 64 in 2000. The original Paper Mario games are role-playing games, though installments in the series since Sticker Star also incorporate action-adventure elements. The series has received positive reviews, being praised for its paper-inspired aesthetic, writing, and characters, but changes to gameplay, such as in combat, received mixed reception. Recent entries since the release of Sticker Star have been criticized for the removal of original fictional races, the abundance of identical Toads, and the restrictions limiting unique character designs.

The Mario & Luigi series was developed by AlphaDream and published by Nintendo, the first game being Mario & Luigi: Superstar Saga for the Game Boy Advance in 2003. The Nintendo 3DS remake of Bowser's Inside Story was AlphaDream's final game before declaring bankruptcy in 2019. Three months after the declaration, however, Nintendo filed a trademark for the series in Argentina. The series had generally received critical acclaim, being praised for their writing, gameplay, and graphics, with some criticism for lack of innovation.

The Mario + Rabbids series is co-developed by Ubisoft Milan and Ubisoft Paris and published worldwide by Ubisoft and published in Asia by Nintendo and is a crossover series with the Raving Rabbids franchise, the first being Mario + Rabbids Kingdom Battle for the Nintendo Switch in 2017.

== Standalone games ==
Game	Details
Super Mario RPG: Legend of the Seven Stars Original release date(s): JP: March 9, 1996; NA: May 13, 1996	Release years by system: 1996 – SNES; 2008 – Wii Virtual Console; 2015 – Wii U Virtual Console; 2017 – Super NES Classic Edition
Super Mario RPG: Legend of the Seven Stars Original release date(s): JP: March 9, 1996; NA: May 13, 1996	Notes: First role-playing video game to feature Mario; Developed by Square; Included on the Super NES Classic Edition dedicated video game console; Released alongside a two-disk soundtrack in Japan
Mario Golf: Advance Tour Original release date(s): JP: April 22, 2004; NA: June 22, 2004; EU: September 17, 2004	Release years by system: 2004 – Game Boy Advance
Mario Golf: Advance Tour Original release date(s): JP: April 22, 2004; NA: June 22, 2004; EU: September 17, 2004	Notes: Developed by Camelot Software Planning
Mario Tennis: Power Tour Original release date(s): JP: September 13, 2005; EU: November 18, 2005; NA: December 5, 2005	Release years by system: 2005 – Game Boy Advance
Mario Tennis: Power Tour Original release date(s): JP: September 13, 2005; EU: November 18, 2005; NA: December 5, 2005	Notes: Developed by Camelot Software Planning
Puzzle & Dragons: Super Mario Bros. Edition Original release date(s): JP: April 29, 2015; EU: May 8, 2015; NA: May 22, 2015	Release years by system: 2015 – Nintendo 3DS
Puzzle & Dragons: Super Mario Bros. Edition Original release date(s): JP: April 29, 2015; EU: May 8, 2015; NA: May 22, 2015	Notes: A crossover between Puzzle & Dragons and the Mario franchise

== Paper Mario series ==
Game	Details
Paper Mario Original release date(s): JP: August 11, 2000; NA: February 5, 2001; EU: October 5, 2001	Release years by system: 2000 – Nintendo 64; 2004 – iQue Player; 2007 – Wii Virtual Console; 2015 – Wii U Virtual Console; 2021 – Nintendo Classics
Paper Mario Original release date(s): JP: August 11, 2000; NA: February 5, 2001; EU: October 5, 2001	Notes: Known in Japan as Mario Story (マリオストーリー); Originally planned to be called Super Mario RPG 2; A soundtrack of the game was released in 2000, distributed by Famitsu.
Paper Mario: The Thousand-Year Door Original release date(s): JP: July 22, 2004; NA: October 11, 2004; EU: November 12, 2004	Release years by system: 2004 – GameCube
Paper Mario: The Thousand-Year Door Original release date(s): JP: July 22, 2004; NA: October 11, 2004; EU: November 12, 2004	Notes: Known in Japan as Paper Mario RPG (ペーパーマリオRPG); Originally planned to be called Mario Story 2 in Japan; Originally planned to be called Paper Mario 2 in North America; Morgan Creek Productions sued Nintendo for using the song "You're So Cool" in one of the game's advertisements without licensing; the lawsuit was dropped six days later after Nintendo provided a copy of a licensing agreement between Morgan Creek Productions and Nintendo's advertising agency, Leo Burnett Worldwide, demonstrating that rights were properly acquired prior to the airing of the advertisement.
Super Paper Mario Original release date(s): NA: April 9, 2007; JP: April 19, 2007; EU: September 14, 2007	Release years by system: 2007 – Wii; 2016 – Wii U Virtual Console
Super Paper Mario Original release date(s): NA: April 9, 2007; JP: April 19, 2007; EU: September 14, 2007	Notes: Announced at E3 2006, originally as a GameCube title; development was later moved to the Wii; First Paper Mario game to shift to the action-adventure genre; First Paper Mario game with Kensuke Tanabe as the lead producer, who has produced all Paper Mario games since; Best-selling Paper Mario game
Paper Mario: Sticker Star Original release date(s): NA: November 11, 2012; JP: December 6, 2012; EU: December 7, 2012	Release years by system: 2012 – Nintendo 3DS
Paper Mario: Sticker Star Original release date(s): NA: November 11, 2012; JP: December 6, 2012; EU: December 7, 2012	Notes: Known in Japan as Paper Mario: Super Seal (ペーパーマリオスーパーシール).; First Paper Mario game on a handheld game console; First game in the series to not have partners alongside Mario; this trend was continued in the next game; First game in the series to primarily focus gameplay towards action-adventure elements, alongside creating different gameplay, such as in combat, for every title
Paper Mario: Color Splash Original release date(s): NA/EU: October 7, 2016; JP: October 13, 2016	Release years by system: 2016 – Wii U
Paper Mario: Color Splash Original release date(s): NA/EU: October 7, 2016; JP: October 13, 2016	Notes: First Paper Mario game in high definition; Put major emphasis on using the Wii U GamePad; Immediately received negative reception following its announcement due to the game continuing the action-adventure format
Paper Mario: The Origami King Original release date(s): WW: July 17, 2020	Release years by system: 2020 – Nintendo Switch
Paper Mario: The Origami King Original release date(s): WW: July 17, 2020	Notes: Known in Japan as Paper Mario: Origami King (ペーパーマリオ オリガミキング); Was created for the Super Mario Bros. 35th Anniversary; Series creator Shigeru Miyamoto was barely involved in the game's development.

== Mario & Luigi series ==
Game	Details
Mario & Luigi: Superstar Saga Original release date(s): NA: November 17, 2003; JP: November 21, 2003; EU: November 21, 2003	Release years by system: 2003 – Game Boy Advance; 2014 – Wii U Virtual Console; 2023 - Nintendo Classics
Mario & Luigi: Superstar Saga Original release date(s): NA: November 17, 2003; JP: November 21, 2003; EU: November 21, 2003	Notes: Known in Japan as Mario & Luigi RPG (マリオ＆ルイージRPG); Produced by Shigeru Miyamoto, Satoru Iwata, and Tetsuo Muzumo
Mario & Luigi: Partners in Time Original release date(s): NA: November 28, 2005; JP: December 29, 2005; EU: January 27, 2006	Release years by system: 2005 – Nintendo DS; 2015 – Wii U Virtual Console
Mario & Luigi: Partners in Time Original release date(s): NA: November 28, 2005; JP: December 29, 2005; EU: January 27, 2006	Notes: Known in Japan as Mario & Luigi RPG 2x2 (マリオ&ルイージRPG2×2); Features Baby Mario and Baby Luigi as playable characters
Mario & Luigi: Bowser's Inside Story Original release date(s): JP: February 11, 2009; NA: September 15, 2009; EU: October 9, 2009	Release years by system: 2009 – Nintendo DS
Mario & Luigi: Bowser's Inside Story Original release date(s): JP: February 11, 2009; NA: September 15, 2009; EU: October 9, 2009	Notes: Known in Japan as Mario & Luigi RPG 3!!! (マリオ&ルイージRPG3!!!); Features Bowser as a playable character; Extensively uses the touchscreen of the Nintendo DS
Mario & Luigi: Dream Team Original release date(s): EU: July 12, 2013; JP: July 18, 2013; NA: August 11, 2013	Release years by system: 2013 – Nintendo 3DS
Mario & Luigi: Dream Team Original release date(s): EU: July 12, 2013; JP: July 18, 2013; NA: August 11, 2013	Notes: Known in Japan as Mario & Luigi RPG 4: Dream Adventure (マリオ&ルイージRPG4 ドリームアドベンチャー); Known in Europe and Australia as Mario & Luigi: Dream Team Bros.; Was created to celebrate the Year of Luigi in 2013; Included with a Mario & Luigi themed Nintendo 3DS XL
Mario & Luigi: Paper Jam Original release date(s): JP: December 3, 2015; EU: December 4, 2015; NA: January 22, 2016	Release years by system: 2015 – Nintendo 3DS
Mario & Luigi: Paper Jam Original release date(s): JP: December 3, 2015; EU: December 4, 2015; NA: January 22, 2016	Notes: Known in Japan as Mario & Luigi RPG Paper Mario Mix (マリオ＆ルイージRPG ペーパーマリオMIX); Known in Europe and Australia as Mario & Luigi: Paper Jam Bros.; A crossover between the Paper Mario and Mario & Luigi series; Last original game in the series before the releases of Superstar Saga and Bowser's Inside Story remakes.
Mario & Luigi: Brothership Original release date(s): WW: November 7, 2024	Release years by system: 2024 – Nintendo Switch
Mario & Luigi: Brothership Original release date(s): WW: November 7, 2024	Notes: Known in Japan as Mario & Luigi RPG: Brothership! (マリオ&ルイージRPG ブラザーシップ!, Mario ando Ruīji Aru Pī Jī: Burazāshippu!); First game in the series not developed by AlphaDream.

== Mario + Rabbids series ==
Game	Details
Mario + Rabbids Kingdom Battle Original release date(s): WW: August 29, 2017	Release years by system: 2017 – Nintendo Switch
Mario + Rabbids Kingdom Battle Original release date(s): WW: August 29, 2017	Notes: A crossover between Raving Rabbids and the Mario franchise; Developed by Ubisoft Milan and Ubisoft Paris using the Snowdrop game engine; A tactical role-playing game
Mario + Rabbids Sparks of Hope Original release date(s): WW: October 20, 2022	Release years by system: 2022 – Nintendo Switch

== Remakes ==
Game	Details
Mario & Luigi: Superstar Saga + Bowser's Minions Original release date(s): JP: October 5, 2017; NA: October 6, 2017; EU: October 6, 2017	Release years by system: 2017 – Nintendo 3DS
Mario & Luigi: Superstar Saga + Bowser's Minions Original release date(s): JP: October 5, 2017; NA: October 6, 2017; EU: October 6, 2017	Notes: Known in Japan as Mario & Luigi RPG1 DX (マリオ＆ルイージRPG1 DX); An expanded remake of Superstar Saga for the Game Boy Advance; Features new modes and updated graphics
Mario & Luigi: Bowser's Inside Story + Bowser Jr.'s Journey Original release date(s): JP: December 27, 2018; NA: January 11, 2019; EU: January 25, 2019	Release years by system: 2018 – Nintendo 3DS
Mario & Luigi: Bowser's Inside Story + Bowser Jr.'s Journey Original release date(s): JP: December 27, 2018; NA: January 11, 2019; EU: January 25, 2019	Notes: Known in Japan as Mario & Luigi RPG3!!! DX (マリオ＆ルイージRPG3!!! DX); An expanded remake of Bowser's Inside Story for the DS; The last game in the series created by AlphaDream before the company declared bankruptcy in 2019
Super Mario RPG Original release date(s): WW: November 17, 2023	Release years by system: 2023 – Nintendo Switch
Super Mario RPG Original release date(s): WW: November 17, 2023	Notes: Remake of Super Mario RPG for the Super NES; Features updated graphics and gameplay and rearranged soundtrack
Paper Mario: The Thousand-Year Door Original release date(s): WW: May 23, 2024	Release years by system: 2024 – Nintendo Switch
Paper Mario: The Thousand-Year Door Original release date(s): WW: May 23, 2024	Notes: Remake of Paper Mario: The Thousand-Year Door for the GameCube
