= Mario & Luigi: Superstar Saga =

2003 video game

- North American box art
- Developer: AlphaDream (Note: Minigames developed by Vanpool)
- Publisher: Nintendo
- Director: Yoshihiko Maekawa
- Producers: Shigeru Miyamoto; Tetsuo Mizuno
- Designer: Hiroyuki Kubota
- Programmer: Masashi Haraki
- Artists: Masanori Sato; Toshizo Morikawa
- Writer: Hiroyuki Kubota
- Composer: Yoko Shimomura
- Series: Mario & Luigi
- Platform: Game Boy Advance
- Release: NA: November 17, 2003; JP/EU: November 21, 2003; AU: November 28, 2003
- Genre: Role-playing
- Mode: Single-player / Co-op

Mario & Luigi: Superstar Saga (Note: Known in Japan as Mario & Luigi RPG (Japanese: マリオ＆ルイージRPG, Hepburn: Mario ando Ruīji Āru Pī Jī)) is a 2003 role-playing video game developed by AlphaDream and published by Nintendo for the Game Boy Advance. It is the first game in the Mario & Luigi series. The story follows Mario and Luigi as they travel to the Beanbean Kingdom in order to combat Cackletta and Fawful, who stole Princess Peach's voice for the purpose of harnessing the power of a special artifact called the Beanstar.

Superstar Saga is the third role-playing game in the Mario franchise, following Super Mario RPG (1996) and Paper Mario (2000), and features a lighthearted, whimsical script with a greater emphasis on comedy than earlier titles. The player controls Mario and Luigi simultaneously as they traverse the overworld, fight enemies, gain experience points, and find new items and gear. The battle system differs from traditional role-playing games, with more emphasis on timing and elaborate attacks called Action Commands. Created by Shigeru Miyamoto, Tetsuo Mizuno, and Satoru Iwata, the game was announced at E3 2003, later releasing the same year.

Superstar Saga was critically acclaimed, with reviewers praising the game's writing, tone and battle system, though its gameplay and top-down perspective received mixed reactions. Critics have since ranked it among the best games on the Game Boy Advance. It was a commercial success, with over 2 million copies sold, and it became a Player's Choice title. A follow-up, Mario & Luigi: Partners in Time, was released for the Nintendo DS in 2005. An enhanced remake with additional story content, Mario & Luigi: Superstar Saga + Bowser's Minions, (Note: Known in Japan as Mario & Luigi RPG 1 DX (マリオ＆ルイージRPG1 DX(デラックス), Mario ando Ruīji Āru Pī Jī Wan Derakkusu)) was released for the Nintendo 3DS in 2017. The original game was rereleased for the Wii U's Virtual Console in 2014, and the Nintendo Classics service in 2023.

== Gameplay ==
Superstar Saga's battle system (GBA version)

The gameplay of Mario & Luigi differs from most other role-playing games due to its focus on controlling Mario and Luigi simultaneously. During overworld sections, the directional pad controls one of the brothers' movement with the other one following closely. The leading brother can be switched between Mario and Luigi with the Start button. The brothers' other actions are controlled individually with the A (front character) and B (rear character) buttons respectively. The game begins with them being able to jump independently, and they gain access to hammers and a variety of other techniques as the game progresses. For example, Luigi's hammer can be used to squash Mario into a smaller size, allowing the latter to access small gaps, while placing Mario on Luigi's shoulders allows them to act like a propeller and hover across large gaps. Various enemies roam the overworld, and coming into contact with these enemies initiates a battle. Landing a hit on an enemy while on the overworld allows the player to deal pre-emptive damage or begin the fight with them stunned. The opposite is also possible.

Battles in Superstar Saga are turn-based. Mario and Luigi are controlled with the A and B buttons respectively, regardless of their placement in the overworld. They can attack normally by jumping on enemies (available from the start), by hitting them with their hammers or by using their hand powers (after these abilities are unlocked at successive points in the game's story). Jump attacks allow the brothers to hit enemies from above, but will cause them to take damage if attempting to jump on spiked or flame-covered creatures. Hammer attacks can harm enemies on the ground, but will always miss against winged or floating ones. Finally, each brother has an elemental hand attack (fire for Mario and thunder for Luigi), with several enemies being either vulnerable or resistant to either element.

Similar to previous Mario role-playing titles, such as Super Mario RPG and the Paper Mario series, players can time button presses to make their attacks more effective, such as earning an extra jump attack or increasing the hammer's power. Introduced in this series is the way in which Mario and Luigi can defend themselves during an enemy's attack. When an enemy attacks, the brothers can either jump or use their hammer which, when successfully timed, allows them to dodge their attacks and even deal counter damage (for example: if they jump on top of a charging Goomba).

Throughout the game, players can unlock Bros. Attacks, which use Bros. Points (BP) which requires players to cooperate between Mario and Luigi's actions to perform powerful combination attacks. Mario and Luigi have their own HP, and one of them will faint when their HP is reduced to zero, with the other brother carrying him when dodging, countering or fleeing from the battle, but Bros. Attacks are unusable until the unconscious brother is revived or some negative status effects are removed. Players can also use items such as mushrooms for healing, peppers for boosting stats and 1UP mushrooms for reviving fallen Bros.

Defeating enemies earns experience points which help the Bros. level up and increase their stats, with players given the option to further increase the stats of one attribute every time they level up. Players can further improve their stats by equipping new gear to the Bros. or making them wear badges that give them special attributes.

Like other Mario titles for the Game Boy Advance, Superstar Saga features the enhanced remake of the Mario Bros. arcade game, which was used in the four Super Mario Advance titles. The game also supports rumble functionality when used with the GameCube's Game Boy Player accessory.

== Plot ==
Mario & Luigi: Superstar Saga is largely set in the Beanbean Kingdom, a country neighboring the Mario series' usual setting of the Mushroom Kingdom, mainly populated by Beanish people and Hoohooligans, with many locations named after onamotapoeia representing laughter. The player characters are brothers Mario and Luigi, who travel to the Beanbean Kingdom to return the voice of Peach, the princess of the Mushroom Kingdom, after it is stolen by the Beanish witch Cackletta and her henchman Fawful. Among other characters are Queen Bean and Prince Peasley of the Beanbean Kingdom, who assist Mario and Luigi; and the thief Popple, who crosses paths with them throughout the game.

Cackletta and Fawful, disguised as ambassadors of the Beanbean Kingdom, visit Princess Peach's castle in the Mushroom Kingdom and steal her voice, replacing it with explosives that drop from her speech balloon when she talks. Mario and Luigi are summoned to the castle, and briefly confront Bowser, who had intended to kidnap Peach, but decides against it due to her explosive speech. The three team up to retrieve Peach's voice, and fly to the Beanbean Kingdom on Bowser's new airship, the Koopa Cruiser. Mid-flight, Fawful attacks them, and Bowser becomes separated from Mario and Luigi after a crash landing on the Mushroom Kingdom side of the Beanbean Kingdom border and being launched from a cannon. After crossing the border and traveling to the peak of Hoohoo mountain, Mario and Luigi defeat a cursed dragon, Dragohoho; freeing Prince Peasley.

The brothers then travel to the Beanbean Kingdom, and are invited to the Beanbean castle, where Cackletta – disguised as the royal advisor Lady Lima – tricks them into helping her steal the Beanstar, a mystical item that when awoken by a noble and beautiful voice will grant any wish. Upon freeing Queen Bean from being transformed into a savage beast by Cackletta, the brothers track Cackletta to Woohoo Hooniversity and find her exposing the Beanstar to the stolen voice, causing it to go berserk. Mario and Luigi battle Cackletta, fatally injuring her; Fawful uses his vacuum-equipped helmet to save her soul. Mario and Luigi locate the Beanstar again, which Popple is trying to steal together with an amnesiac Bowser as his sidekick; when it again is exposed to Peach's voice, it shoots into the sky and explodes, scattering across the kingdom. Peach arrives by airport in the Beanbean Kingdom, and Mario and Luigi learn that Birdo had been used as a political decoy during Cackletta's visit; the Beanstar became enraged after hearing Birdo's voice.

Fawful finds Bowser after he regains his memory, albeit weakened from the Beanstar's explosion, and places Cackletta's soul inside him; she takes control of the body, and takes the name Bowletta. She kidnaps Peach, and demands the Beanstar as ransom; Mario and Luigi collect the pieces, and meet with her in the frozen palace Joke's End to make the exchange. Bowletta refuses to return Peach, so Luigi disguises himself as Peach to be taken in her stead, and reclaims the Beanstar, returning it with Mario to Queen Bean after a final confrontation with Popple, who is later arrested and forced to do community service in Little Fungitown, a community of Mushroom Kingdom immigrants. Bowletta uses Bowser's flying castle to attack the Beanbean Kingdom. Mario and Luigi navigate their way through the castle, expel Fawful, and battle Bowletta. After she vacuums them inside her stomach, they battle Cackletta's soul and exorcise her from Bowser's body, reducing her to nothing and returning Bowser to normal. Peasley blows up the flying castle while the brothers escape. Mario, Luigi, and Peach receive Bowser as a parting gift before taking an airplane home to the Mushroom Kingdom, dropping Bowser off at his new castle mid-flight.

== Development and marketing ==
Superstar Saga, developed by AlphaDream and directed by Super Mario RPG: Legend of the Seven Stars co-director Yoshihiko Maekawa, is said to take its inspiration from the Nintendo 64 game Paper Mario; the two games have similar graphics and gameplay. The producers of the game were Shigeru Miyamoto, the creator of the Mario franchise, Tetsuo Mizuno, and Satoru Iwata, the president of Nintendo. The voice acting for Mario and Luigi in the game is provided by Charles Martinet, well known for providing the characters' voice in Nintendo's Mario franchise. The game's music was composed by Yoko Shimomura, who also previously composed the soundtrack for Super Mario RPG.

Superstar Saga was revealed at E3 2003 under the name Mario and Luigi, where a playable demo of the game was available. In August and September 2003, a playable demonstration was also available at the European Computer Trade Show, the Games Convention, and Nintendo Gamers' Summit. To link in with the game's comedic themes, Nintendo organized an official competition between October and November 2003 in which contestants would try to submit the best knock-knock joke to win a Game Boy Advance SP and a copy of the game. Nintendo employed comedian Kathy Griffin to choose the winner.

== Reception ==
Reception

Aggregate scores
Aggregator	Score	
Aggregator	3DS	GBA
Metacritic	81/100	90/100
OpenCritic	83% recommend	N/A

Review scores
Publication	Score	
Publication	3DS	GBA
Computer and Video Games	N/A	8/10
Destructoid	7.5/10	N/A
Edge	N/A	8/10
Electronic Gaming Monthly	4/5	8.83/10
Eurogamer	N/A	9/10
Famitsu	32/40	37/40
G4	N/A	5/5
Game Informer	N/A	9.5/10
GamePro	N/A	4/5
GameSpot	8/10	9.2/10
GameSpy	N/A	8.5/10
GamesTM	N/A	9/10
GameZone	N/A	9.4/10
IGN	N/A	9/10
NGC Magazine	N/A	94/100
Nintendo Life	9/10	9/10
Nintendo Power	N/A	4.7/5
Nintendo World Report	9/10	9.5/10
Play	N/A	A−
Pocket Gamer	N/A	4.5/5
Polygon	8/10	N/A

Superstar Saga received "universal acclaim", according to the review aggregator website Metacritic. The game's comical dialog and themes were particularly lauded by critics. Eurogamer's Tom Bramwell commented that "each line of dialogue and identifiable cameo is handled with a loving sense of humour." Despite this, RPGamer's Andrew Long labelled the plot as repetitive, and the game's characters as "a tad shallow". While also appreciating references to the heritage of the Mario series, critics praised the game for avoiding clichés common in previous games of the Mario series.

The gameplay attained a mixed reception. Critics enjoyed the game's battle system, which deviated from role-playing game tradition. IGN's Craig Harris commented that "unlike most Japanese RPGs Mario & Luigi's turn-based battle involves the player at all times". Despite this novel approach to combat situations, some reviewers thought that the overall gameplay lacked innovation. In particular, Gamespy criticized the game for an apparent lack of originality, commenting that "in terms of gameplay, there isn't much there that we haven't seen in the NES and SNES Mario and Zelda titles." Furthermore, some reviewers were disappointed by a perceived lack of difficulty in the gameplay as a result of targeting a younger audience. Edge and other gaming publications have criticized the controls for being occasionally confusing when considering the usage of jumping, hammers, and other combinations between the two characters.

A common concern among reviewers is the overhead perspective, which critics have bemoaned for preventing them from judging pathway routes and an object's location in relation to its background. Besides this, the actual visuals were generally well received, as well as the setting and animations. The audio was commended for combining both originality and nostalgia, even though it looped frequently.

GameSpot named Superstar Saga the best Game Boy Advance game of November 2003. During the AIAS' 7th Annual Interactive Achievement Awards, Superstar Saga was nominated for Handheld Game of the Year. In 2006, Superstar Saga was rated the 37th best game made on a Nintendo System in Nintendo Power's Top 200 Games list. In the same year, the game became part of the Player's Choice label. In 2007, the game was named the twelfth best Game Boy Advance game of all time in IGN's feature reflecting on the Game Boy Advance's long lifespan. In the United States alone, Superstar Saga sold 1,000,000 copies and earned $30,000,000 by August 2006. During the period between January 2000 and August 2006, it was the 14th highest-selling game launched for the Game Boy Advance, Nintendo DS or PlayStation Portable in that country. As of 2021, the game has sold 2.15 million units.

== Remake ==
Mario & Luigi: Superstar Saga + Bowser's Minions
- North American game box
- Developer: AlphaDream
- Publisher: Nintendo
- Director: Shunsuke Kobayashi
- Producers: Akira Otani; Toshiharu Izuno; Yoshihiko Maekawa; Keisuke Terasaki; Toyokazu Nonaka
- Artists: Takuji Sasaki; Kouichi Fukazawa
- Writer: Hiroyuki Kubota
- Composer: Yoko Shimomura
- Series: Mario & Luigi
- Platform: Nintendo 3DS
- Release: JP: October 5, 2017; NA/EU: October 6, 2017; AU: October 7, 2017
- Genre: Role-playing
- Mode: Single-player

A remake of Superstar Saga for Nintendo 3DS, Mario & Luigi: Superstar Saga + Bowser's Minions, was announced at E3 2017. The remake features updated graphics, maintaining the use of sprites, but with additional lighting effects akin to Dream Team and Paper Jam, as well as a remastered soundtrack and various quality-of-life improvements that were introduced in later entries of the series, such as the ability to save the game at any time, and to fast-forward cutscenes, among others. The game also features Amiibo functionality, tied to the existing Boo and new Goomba and Koopa Troopa figures. The game was released in October 2017.

=== Plot ===
The plot of the remake remains the same as the original game, but also features an additional storyline, Minion Quest: The Search for Bowser, which follows Captain Goomba and features a real-time strategy battle system.

==== Minion Quest: The Search for Bowser ====
In the Koopa Cruiser, Bowser's airship traveling to the Beanbean Kingdom, two Goombas, Captain Goomba and Private Goomp, trapped inside barrels become allies in order to give the Goombas their deserved reputation by ceasing slavery by the Koopalings. However, Bowser's airship is crashed by Fawful. Captain Goomba awakens on Hoohoo Mountain and decides to rescue Bowser after witnessing him being shot from a cannon. Captain Goomba gathers an army and starts his search.

Upon learning that some of the minions – including Private Goomp – were brainwashed by Fawful trying to rescue Bowser and that his mission is in direct competition with the Koopalings, Captain Goomba confronts Fawful, only to fall off the mountain. Realizing Fawful is too powerful, Captain Goomba allies once more with Private Goomp and forms a new army; the army travels across all the kingdom to recruit others to their cause. Meanwhile, the Koopalings get brainwashed by Fawful. Saving Larry, the latter joins them on the condition of finding the six other Koopalings.

With Larry and Wendy on their side, the Minion's Army arrives back at Hoohoo Mountain, witnessing an amnesiac Bowser being recruited by Popple as his "Rookie". The Minions pursue Popple – saving Morton in the process – and find he has lost Bowser, who has become possessed by Cackletta, now going by Bowletta. The army finds Roy and Bowser's airship. Upon repairing it, they learn from Fawful that Bowletta is in Bowser's Castle. The Minions fly there and recruit the remaining Koopalings, gaining the respect that the Goombas always wanted.

With Bowser's army fully complete, the Minions confront Fawful and his "Mecha" army; Bowser's army emerges victorious, Fawful fleeing to join Bowletta. However, both are defeated by the Mario Bros. Bowser's Castle explodes, and Bowser, back to normal, returns to his domain with the army. Bowser promotes Captain Goomba but then remembers he caused his amnesia and starts to pursue him in anger.

== See also ==
- List of Game Boy Advance games
- List of role-playing video games
- List of video games featuring Mario
- 2003 in video games
