= Mario + Rabbids =

Mario + Rabbids may refer to:

- Mario + Rabbids Kingdom Battle, a 2017 video game by Ubisoft
- Mario + Rabbids Sparks of Hope, a 2022 video game by Ubisoft

== See also ==
- Mario (franchise)
- Rabbids
