= Mario & Luigi: Paper Jam =

2015 video game

- European cover art, featuring Mario (left), Luigi (center), and Paper Mario (top right)
- Developer: AlphaDream
- Publisher: Nintendo
- Directors: Shunsuke Kobayashi; Hiroyuki Kubota
- Producers: Akira Ohtani; Yoshihiko Maekawa; Toshiharu Izuno
- Programmers: Makoto Aioi; Haruhiko Tanuma
- Artists: Akira Noguchi; Takuji Sasaki
- Writer: Shunsuke Kobayashi
- Composer: Yoko Shimomura
- Series: Mario & Luigi; Paper Mario
- Platform: Nintendo 3DS
- Release: JP: December 3, 2015; EU: December 4, 2015; NA: January 22, 2016
- Genre: Role-playing
- Mode: Single-player

Mario & Luigi: Paper Jam, (Note: Known in Japan as Mario & Luigi RPG Paper Mario MIX (マリオ&ルイージRPG ペーパーマリオMIX(ミックス), Mario ando ruīji RPG pēpāmario Mikkusu)) known in Europe and Australia as Mario & Luigi: Paper Jam Bros., is a 2015 role-playing video game developed by AlphaDream and published by Nintendo for the Nintendo 3DS console. It is the fifth installment in the Mario & Luigi series, following Dream Team (2013), and serves as a crossover between the Mario & Luigi and Paper Mario series, the latter being a cross-genre series developed by Intelligent Systems.

In Paper Jam, Luigi accidentally opens a book containing a paper counterpart world causing all of its contents to spread into the Mushroom Kingdom; Mario and Luigi, with the help of the befriended Paper Mario, venture to save both Princess Peach universe variants from Bowser, who has teamed up with his paper counterpart as well. In the game, the player controls the trio simultaneously through an overworld to reach Bowser's Castle, and fights enemies in turn-based combat along the way.

Paper Jam was developed by AlphaDream while Intelligent Systems oversaw production. The concept of a crossover came to be when AlphaDream conceptualized a third character for the player to control in-game to help shake up the traditional gameplay of the series. They considered the combination to work well due to the two series having shared gameplay features as well as opportunities to use the Paper Mario series for new gameplay options. The game was announced at E3 2015 and launched ahead of schedule, released internationally in December 2015 and in North America the following month.

Reception of the game was generally positive, receiving praise for the introduction of Paper Mario elements and combat, mixed opinions for its writing, and criticism for usage of worldbuilding and minigames. Critics felt the game failed to use the crossover aspects with the Paper Mario series to their fullest potential. Paper Jam was the last Mario & Luigi installment made by AlphaDream, followed by two remakes of previous titles in the series, before the company filed for bankruptcy in 2019. Acquire would take over development duties for the sequel Mario & Luigi: Brothership, which was released on November 7, 2024 for the Nintendo Switch; several key staff members of AlphaDream were brought on to work on the game alongside them.

== Gameplay ==
Paper Jam is a role-playing game that follows a similar format of previous games in the Mario & Luigi series, with some additional reliance on elements from the Paper Mario series as well. The player simultaneously controls Mario, Luigi, and Paper Mario from his respective series, and travels the Mushroom Kingdom overworld to reach Bowser's Castle to save both Princess Peach variants from both Bowser variants from their respective universes. Each of the three uses a different button to control them. In the overworld, the player can talk to non-player characters (NPCs) and solve puzzles, some of which are required to be solved in order to progress. Some puzzles involve using character-specific actions; for example, Paper Mario can use his paper-thin body to squeeze through small gaps to reach areas inaccessible by Mario and Luigi. In other cases, the three learn additional special moves as the main storyline continues, which can be used in the overworld to solve puzzles that hinder progression or other secret areas.

Paper Mario uses his copy ability while Mario and Luigi observe.

Some of the involved puzzles are minigame sessions that break up traditional gameplay. In certain boss battles, the trio rides a large-scale paper-craft version of a character or enemy from the Mario franchise and fight another enemy—also on a papercraft—in an open arena with the goal of destroying the enemies papercraft. In another, the player is tasked by a Lakitu to return to previously explored segments to find hidden Paper Toads, who in return offer rewards and advice for further progression.

When the player comes in contact with an enemy in the overworld, a battle-sequence will commence. Combat in Paper Jam is turn-based; they can select one of the various methods to attack the enemies present as each of the three characters, and vary from dealing damage to healing lost health using an item. To attack, the player must press buttons in a timed fashion to maximize how much damage is dealt. Attack methods of the trio can be combined to involve more than one of the three, to deal even further damage. Similarly, when the enemy attacks, buttons need to be pressed in anticipation of the attack so the trio takes less damage. As the game progresses, the player is given access to "Battle Cards", which can be used by the player in combat for additional perks, such as increasing the amount of damage given to certain enemies. Certain Mario Amiibo can be used for further bonuses.

== Plot ==
Luigi and a Toad enter the attic of Princess Peach's Castle to find the source of a wind draft. When Luigi accidentally bumps into a bookshelf and knocks open a book containing a book world counterpart inside it, the book opens up and shoots its contents across the Mushroom Kingdom. Princess Peach and her counterpart Paper Princess Peach meet, and send Mario and Luigi to round up the citizens of the game, equipped with the book to return them to their original home. Meanwhile, Bowser discovers his paper counterpart, Paper Bowser, and the two merge their armies. Mario and Luigi meet Paper Mario and return to Peach's Castle, only to find that the two princesses have been kidnapped by both Bowsers; they begin their quest towards Bowser's Castle to save them.

As the trio progresses through various locales to reach their destination, they are hindered by various enemies who have teamed up with their paper counterparts, some of which serve as the game's bosses. They also come across large groups of enemies wielding large Papercraft dioramas of enemies found in-game; the trio fights the giant papercraft using their own dioramas, which are constructed by Toadette. During their journey, they are confronted by Bowser Jr. and his paper counterpart, Paper Bowser Jr., who take the book from Luigi.

As the trio approaches Bowser's Castle, they are once again approached by the two Bowser Jrs., who kidnap Toadette to prevent the production of new papercraft. Mario, Luigi, Paper Mario, and Toadette battle the two Bowser Jr's and retrieve the book. Enraged by their sons's defeat, the two Bowser lifts their castle into the sky to prevent the trio from entering and retriving the book, renaming it the "Neo Bowser Castle".

The trio venture to a nearby mountain to enter Neo Bowser's Castle from a high distance. As they approach the castle's interior, the Bowser duo sends waves of various enemy and boss duos, but all are defeated. The trio approaches the Bowsers, who reveal their true intentions: they planned on capturing the three in the book and promptly burning the book to ash. Each Bowser also secretly planned to double-cross the other and capture them in the book as well. The heroes defeat Bowser and capture Paper Bowser in the book. Toadette hosts a papercraft parade in celebration, and the paper counterparts say their goodbyes and enter the book. The game closes with Bowser attacking the Mushroom Kingdom once more, prompting Mario and Luigi to stop him.

== Development and release ==
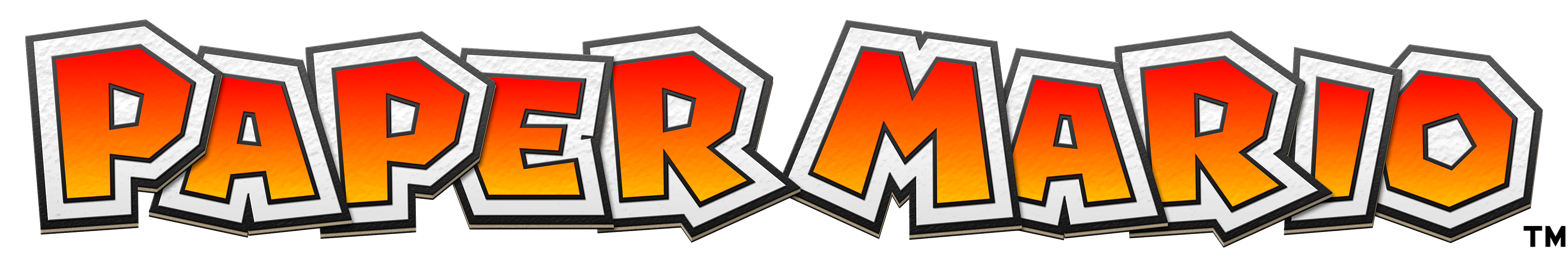
Paper Jam is a crossover between the Mario & Luigi and Paper Mario series (logo pictured).

Like the previous games in the series, Paper Jam was developed by AlphaDream and published by Nintendo. Intelligent Systems, developer of the Paper Mario series, oversaw the game's production and gave advice when needed. Akira Otani served as the game's producer, and Shunsuke Kobayashi and Jun Iwasaki served as directors. The game was announced at E3 2015 and was scheduled for a spring release in 2016 for the Nintendo 3DS. It was announced to release ahead of schedule via a Nintendo Direct, however, and was available in Japan and Europe on December 3 and 4 respectively, and North America the following January 22. In Europe and Australia, the game is titled Mario & Luigi: Paper Jam Bros.

=== Scenario ===
Prior to considering a Paper Mario crossover, the developers discussed ways to deviate from typical Mario & Luigi gameplay and decided on using another button to control a third character alongside Mario and Luigi, according to producer Akira Otani. They first considered using an in-universe character from the Mario franchise, such as Bowser, but eventually decided to use another variant of Mario himself, therefore gravitating towards Paper Mario to fulfill the role. They knew the series crossover would blend well, considering how both used adventure and role-playing video game elements and being guided by humorous dialogue and scenarios. They could also use the element of paper for gameplay contrast, using Paper Mario for lightweight or thin objectives that Mario and Luigi cannot do themselves. When pulling ideas from the Paper Mario series they mainly drew inspiration from Paper Mario: Sticker Star, the most recent Paper Mario game at the time.

=== Gameplay and writing ===
One of the game's main challenges in the development process was to retain the series' core philosophy of making a role-playing game that was presentable and easily accessible to a broad audience. One of the first prototypes of Paper Jam had the player rapidly tapping three different buttons to perform a trio combo move; when Otani presented the concept to Mario creator Shigeru Miyamoto, he quickly rejected the idea and told them to make the action simpler to perform. They considered adding Paper Luigi as a fourth character, being controlled by a fourth button, but this was eventually deemed too complicated to comfortably manage as a player and he was later cut. The giant papercraft battles stemmed from the vision of making the game as lively as possible, similar to a carnival setting. The papercraft models were based on shrines found at Japanese festivals.

The developers went through multiple drafts for the game's plot, two ideas including the Mushroom Kingdom of the Mario & Luigi universe slowly transforming to paper, and having the trio move back and forth between both universes. They chose to have elements from the Paper Mario universe added on top of the Mario & Luigi universe instead, to instead focus more on the character dynamics between both universes. The developers received negative feedback on their previous title due to the series having increasingly excessive tutorials, including directions for minuscule actions. AlphaDream implemented a feature where the player can skip through content they already know, and the game detects a player's skill level and skips other elements automatically, with the exception of new game elements.

== Reception ==
Reception

Aggregate scores
Aggregator	Score
Metacritic	76/100
OpenCritic	54% recommend

Review scores
Publication	Score
Destructoid	8/10
Famitsu	33/40
Game Informer	8.75/10
GameSpot	6/10
GamesRadar+	4/5
Giant Bomb	4/5
IGN	5.9/10
Nintendo Life	8/10
Nintendo World Report	7.5/10
PCMag	3.5/5
Polygon	6.5/10
Shacknews	7/10

Mario & Luigi: Paper Jam received "generally favorable reviews" according to review aggregator website Metacritic, scoring a 76/100 on the site based on 76 reviews. Fellow review aggregator OpenCritic assessed that the game received strong approval, being recommended by 54% of critics. In Japan, four critics from Famitsu gave the game a total score of 33 out of 40. The game sold 49,000 copies in Japan in its debut week, equivalent to half the sales of the prior game, Mario & Luigi: Dream Team. As of 2022 the game has sold 1.08 million copies worldwide.

Among critics, combat was most positively received, mainly due to its use of new Paper Mario elements to keep it engaging. GamesRadar+ review Alex Jones commented that Paper Mario refreshed combat in-game, especially for series veterans, and while Kyle Hilliard of Game Informer felt that a third character made things cumbersome at certain times, battles were never entirely unmanageable or unfair. GameSpot's Miguel Concepcion considered the game's combat "worthy of the attention", and how the addition of new paper enemies made each battle a new experience. Jared Petty, writing for IGN, found the battle system to be an in-depth experience, and each battle utilized a different element to keep the new additions from becoming overwhelming. Janine Hawkins of Polygon enjoyed the unique trio attacks, but the button requirements to fulfill were oftentimes too difficult and relied too much on memorization. Both Jones and Nintendo Life's Conor McMahon found Amiibo use to be effective, although McMahon' warned that they would be used often and having it on hand while playing was vital. Hilliard appreciated the added collectible value the cards brought, especially how they had functionality when in combat, while McMahon positively compared the card system to similar RPG features found in Paper Mario: The Thousand-Year Door.

Writing and humor received mixed opinions, and most critics believed the game did not capitalize on using Paper Mario elements to its fullest. Petty and McMahon commented that the additions of paper counterparts were unique addition but often predictable, and the game never fully took advantage of the narrative of colliding universes. Concepcion felt that the game did not use the crossover to its fullest expense, but considered Paper Jam to be a good gateway experience to a newcomer. Hilliard found the plot to be on the less compelling side, but they enjoyed the complex narratives of having two of the same character interacting, especially how both Bowser counterparts could not work well with each other. Jones considered the main storyline to be too lengthy and slow-paced but was excellently broken up with minigames and other features that broke up the standard format. GameSpot commended the writing from both series and how they blended well with each other but did not experience any laugh-out-loud moments—mainly in part due to their belief that AlphaDream played writing too safely.

Concepcion called the worldbuilding unique and applauded how it encouraged the player to explore, but due to collectibles and items being common he felt no reason to do so. Petty found the environment to be "colorful but uninspired", and were too similar to other Mario entries to hold interest, especially due to the lack of interesting landmarks to distinguish areas. He also believed that the Toad Hunts, one of the game's various minigames, continuously broke the story's pacing in a negative way in comparison to the upbeat Papercraft battles. Nintendo Life, alternatively, called Toad Hunts a "fun diversion". Jones considered the Papercraft battles to be one of Paper Jam's weaker elements, but overall an interesting way to break up the pace. Similarly, Hawkins enjoyed the unique one-off moments like the Papercraft battles in the storyline but oftentimes felt they dragged or became too complicated, leading to tedious repetition.

== See also ==
- Paper Mario: The Origami King
- List of Mario role-playing games
