= Mario & Luigi: Brothership =

2024 video game

- Icon artwork
- Developer: Acquire (Note: Additional work by Racjin)
- Publisher: Nintendo
- Director: Haruyuki Ohashi
- Producers: Masahiro Kumono; Takuma Endo; Akira Otani; Shinya Saito
- Designer: Shunsuke Kobayashi
- Programmer: Takafumi Ogihara
- Artist: Hitomi Furuta
- Composer: Hideki Sakamoto
- Series: Mario & Luigi
- Engine: Unreal Engine
- Platform: Nintendo Switch
- Release: November 7, 2024
- Genre: Role-playing
- Mode: Single-player

Mario & Luigi: Brothership (Note: Known in Japan as Mario & Luigi RPG: Brothership!, (Japanese: マリオ&ルイージRPG ブラザーシップ!, Hepburn: Mario ando Ruīji Aru Pī Jī: Burazāshippu!)) is a 2024 role-playing video game developed by Acquire and published by Nintendo for the Nintendo Switch. It is the sixth installment in the Mario & Luigi series.

Following the appearance of a mysterious portal, Mario and Luigi, alongside other residents of the Mushroom Kingdom, find themselves transported to the world of Concordia, where they work to reunite the land after a dark force begins to separate and isolate its inhabitants in solitude. Players control the brothers to explore Concordia, solve puzzles and complete quests, while engaging enemies they encounter in turn-based combat.

Mario & Luigi: Brothership was first announced in a Nintendo Direct in June 2024, revealing a change of developer for the series following AlphaDream's 2019 closure due to bankruptcy. The preview revealed that Acquire had focused on creating a fully 3D game, designed for a home console, with a greater emphasis on exploration and quests, and modifications to the battle system to focus on teamwork actions with attacks. Players pilot Shipshape Island to explore the various lands of Concordia, which initially restrict where the players can go until the island is reconnected, opening up new areas to explore.

Mario & Luigi: Brothership received generally positive reviews from critics, who praised its art style, combat, and story. The "Luigi Logic" mechanic received mixed reactions, and the pacing and performance were criticized. Brothership was the last game with Samantha Kelly as the voice of Princess Peach and Toad, before being replaced by Courtney Lin and Laila Berzins in Mario Kart World.

== Gameplay ==
Mario and Luigi engaged in a battle. Brothership is the first entry in the Mario & Luigi series with fully 3D visuals.

Brothership is a role-playing game that follows a similar gameplay formula to previous Mario & Luigi titles. Players simultaneously control Mario and Luigi, as they explore and reconnect the islands of Concordia whilst battling against enemies. Both brothers have their own buttons assigned to them for exploring the overworld and for combat. Exploration includes talking to non-player characters, completing quests and solving puzzles.

The game features a central hub called Shipshape Island, which acts like a ship. Players can explore Concordia's seas in order to find islands and other points of interest. On islands, the main focus is to find and reconnect it to Shipshape Island via a giant plug. Once accomplished, the islands are connected to the ship and more NPCs become available. Brothership features a unique game mechanic called "Luigi Logic", which allows Luigi to act autonomously, often to collect items or to help solve some of the game's puzzles, and to come up with new moves that can help defeat bosses. Alongside the main story, the player can also explore small islets for extra rewards, and undertake sidequests. Mario and Luigi can also perform special "Bros. Moves", including moves for traversal and navigation as well as the ability to throw fireballs.

Combat in Brothership follows the usual Mario & Luigi formula; players can attack via a jump or a hammer, use items to heal damage, or flee from battle. Timed button-presses give the opportunity to boost attacks, dodge enemy attacks or perform a counter-attack. The brothers can assist each other when performing basic attacks for extra damage. Progressing through the game opens up Bros. Attacks, which feature a mixture of new and returning moves as well as "Battle Plugs": special upgrades which confer a bonus in battle, including making counterattacks easier, recovering health points, and enhancing attack power. These can be switched around at the start of a character's turn, but each plug has a set number of charges that drain out when used and which must be recharged once drained.

== Synopsis ==
=== Setting ===
The game takes place in the world of Concordia, a formerly peaceful land held together by the power of a large tree known as the Uni-Tree, and an energy called Connectar that flowed from giant lighthouses. Following a disaster to the Uni-Tree, the world was separated into a series of islands floating in a vast sea, with one island known as Shipshape Island, due to resembling a ship, capable of moving around the seas and acting as the central hub for the game's story. Each island encompasses its own biome and theme, such as an artisan town, and a land of ice and fire inhabited by tribes in each area.

=== Plot ===
One day in the Mushroom Kingdom, a mysterious portal appears and transports Mario, Luigi, and the kingdom's inhabitants – including Princess Peach, the star sprite Starlow, Bowser, and Bowser Jr. – to the world of Concordia. After reuniting on a moving island called Shipshape Island, Mario and Luigi befriend Connie, a Wattanist, who reveals how Concordia used to be one continent connected together by a large Uni-Tree and the energy of Connectar, until a dark force emerged and destroyed the tree, separating the land into islands. Revealing she is working to create a new Uni-Tree on Shipshape, the brothers agree to help her reconnect the separated land with Shipshape, and are accompanied on their journey by Snoutlet, a pig-like creature with wings. To reconnect the islands, the brothers seek out each island's Lighthouse which can be used to bind the island to Shipshape and its Uni-Tree with a magical plug outlet. During their efforts to do so, the brothers reunite with Peach and Starlow, who decide to assist them on their quest. Throughout their journey to connect multiple islands to Shipshape, the group learns about strange fairy-like creatures known as Sprite Bulbs - which feed off Connectar and produce a substance known as Lumenade that can be used to craft Battle Plugs.

The group soon discovers that the original Uni-Tree was destroyed by a mysterious masked villain named Zokket, who is aided by minions known as the Extension Corps. Harvesting a dark energy called Glohm from the Sprite Bulbs that were cut off from Connectar and had to survive off their own energy, Zokket seeks to use this to turn everyone into creatures of solitude, who shun everyone away and seek complete isolation. As Zokket’s troops use Glohm to cause havoc upon Concordia's inhabitants, Mario and Luigi eventually learn of a fruit known as an Ampberry, which can neutralize Glohm. However, the fruit is only grown on Wayaway Island, which was an island that was said to be around long before Concordia split. As they seek out the fruit, Mario and Luigi discover Bowser and Bowser Jr. are battling with Zokket over control of Concordia. When the brothers engage with Bowser to claim the Ampberries he was hoarding, Zokket has Bowser Jr. kidnapped in order to lure him into a trap. After being forced to fight a Glohm-infected Bowser, Mario and Luigi retreat to safety upon finding that Zokket is too powerful for them.

Becoming stranded on Conductor Island, they encounter the Great Conductor, Snoutlet's teacher, who reveals that he had been guiding the brothers in hopes that their strong bond could save Concordia. He also discloses that Zokket's true identity is Coonie's mentor Cozette who had been brainwashed by an evil entity called Reclusa. The brothers learn that Reclusa desires a world of solitude, and has been residing in an egg in order to recharge, waiting to be reawakened with Glohm. After returning to Fortress Zokket, the brothers defeat both the Extension Corps (who flee the fortress upon defeat) and Zokket. However, momentarily after Zokket's defeat, Reclusa hatches and reverts Zokket back to Cozette, believing that she had served her purpose in his grand return. The brothers are then driven out of the fortress. Using his power, Reclusa soon creates a mirror opposite of the Uni-Tree called the Soli-Tree, and traps most of the population inside flowers simulating a virtual reality of their greatest desires as preparations to socially isolate Concordia. Whilst Cozette - who is recovered from brainwashing - reconciles with Connie, Mario and Luigi work to acquire Bond Energy from companions they've encountered in their quest, including the now-reformed Extension Corps, in order to penetrate the Soli-Tree's defenses.

Upon reaching the Soli-Tree, Mario and Luigi escape being trapped in a virtual simulation, and receive unintentional aid from Bowser in defeating Reclusa's forces. After chasing Reclusa back to the base of the Soli-Tree, Reclusa uses Glohm to fuse with the tree to overpower them. However, with guidance from Cozette, Connie helps the brothers by empowering them with the Bond Energy that allows them to defeat Reclusa and free Concordia. After Reclusa’s death and the Soli-Tree’s destruction, the Great Conductor waits for Mario and Luigi to say their goodbyes before he sends them back to the Mushroom Kingdom using the last of his power. Before they leave, Connie gives Mario a Uni-Tree sapling as parting gift. Upon returning home, Mario and Luigi are relaxing before a Toad runs up to warn them about Bowser invading Peach’s castle. The two brothers spring into action once again while in the distance, the Uni-Tree sapling grows and Sprite Bulbs flutter around it.

== Development ==
After AlphaDream's Mario & Luigi: Paper Jam finished development in 2015, internal discussions about the future of the series began. Producer Akira Otani, along with many of AlphaDream's staff, returned to work on the game, moving to Acquire with director Haruyuki Ohashi taking over the directional role. The move was due to AlphaDream filing for bankruptcy in 2019. The game's soundtrack was composed by Hideki Sakamoto, rather than series composer Yoko Shimomura. According to Otani, Nintendo once considered "giving up" on the Mario & Luigi series, before changing their mind and contracting Acquire to develop the game. Art director Hitomi Furuta stated that the game was originally planned to take on a unique art style featuring a more "rugged Mario", before Nintendo requested it to be made more in-line with the series' usual style. Otani said that he wanted to come up with new ideas that would involve the hardware advancements while keeping the appeal of the previous games for those who played them.

At first, Connie was designed to be a human. However, she later became a plug-like character to retain the protagonist Mario's human distinctness. Snoutlet was later created to act as the protagonists' new ally, originally envisioned as a generic plug before becoming a pig-like outlet. To translate the series' formerly pixel art style to the 3D realm, the developers used the 3DS sprites of Mario and Luigi as reference for expressions and animations. The team particularly aimed to include a drawn outline on the characters, a characteristic of the series' past artwork, despite it being CPU-intensive and visually limiting to implement. Furuta cited Super Mario Odyssey as an inspiration for Mario's running animation.

According to Otani, Acquire's approach was quite different from AlphaDream's, as Ohashi's main goal was to have an external story-writing company develop the plot in parallel with Acquire's work on the island-drifting gameplay. Ohashi remarked that this approach initially made it challenging to arrive at a fitting story, until the theme of "connection" was conceived for the game. Tomoki Fukushima, the game's associate producer, felt that the Mario Bros.'s cooperation received more focus than previous games and eventually decided that Luigi could act as an automated character, leading to the conception of the "Luigi Logic" mechanic. Otani stated how, during development, the team was unaware of the release of the animated feature film The Super Mario Bros. Movie in 2023, and commented on the opening cutscene showing Mario and Luigi getting taken to a portal and separated in a similar fashion to the movie, calling it a coincidence.

Unlike previous installments of the series, Brothership's Japanese title is almost entirely the same as the English one, with the difference being that it has an exclamation mark in the end. Otani stated that they decided to keep the English title the same as a Japanese one, with Fukishima remarking that the title referred to the titular brothers' bond and the game's hub Shipshape Island.

Hideki Sakamoto's soundtrack made use of wind instruments, accordions, brass bands, and tropical steelpans, since they captured the "Mario & Luigi" feeling the best, said Ohashi. Otani added that the game had a unique music track for each story event and cutscene, contrasting the approach to the previous titles, resulting in the soundtrack including over 100 tracks.

After AlphaDream filed for bankruptcy in 2019, Nintendo filed a new trademark for Mario & Luigi in January 2020. On June 18, 2024, the game was officially revealed in a Nintendo Direct. Following the reveal, Nintendo noted that "some of the original developers" from the franchise, referring to AlphaDream, are involved in the development of Brothership, but did not reveal what studio was producing the game. The primary developer was later revealed to be Acquire from the game's intellectual property notices; they had previously worked on Octopath Traveler, which Nintendo initially published outside of Japan. The game released on the Nintendo Switch on November 7, 2024.

== Reception ==
Reception

Aggregate scores
Aggregator	Score
Metacritic	77/100 (Note: Based on 102 reviews)
OpenCritic	66% recommend (Note: Based on 116 reviews)

Review scores
Publication	Score
Destructoid	6/10
Eurogamer	4/5
Famitsu	8/10, 9/10, 8/10, 9/10
GameSpot	6/10
GamesRadar+	4/5
IGN	5/10
Nintendo Life	9/10
PCMag	4/5
Shacknews	9/10
The Guardian	4/5

Mario & Luigi: Brothership received "generally favorable" reviews from critics, according to the review aggregation website Metacritic. In Japan, four critics from Famitsu gave the game a total score of 34 out of 40.

PJ O'Reilly of Nintendo Life and Ozzie Mejia of Shacknews praised the game's combat system, story, and art style. The Gamer's Eric Switzer praised the story for being "surprisingly mature and impactful for a Mario game", along with the combat, while criticizing the game's sailing system. Writing for the Daily Mirror, Aaron Potter lauded the aesthetics, stating that the game was "the best the RPG series has ever looked". PCMag's Will Greenwald gave the game an Editor's Choice award, describing it as "colorful, charming, mechanically engaging". Josephine Watson of TechRadar enjoyed the characters, combat, puzzles, and visuals, while noting several performance issues, described as the "Nintendo Switch generational curse". GameSpot's Steve Watts commended the "Plug" mechanic and praised the art style, as well as the story for telling a "sweet if simple fable about togetherness and human connection", while lamenting the pacing and performance; they felt that the game was too ambitious for its own good due to its length.

More critical reviews include Giovanni Colantonio's of Digital Trends who criticized the pacing and writing of humor for what he described as devoid of wit, but praised the story for being "the most socially relevant a Mario game has ever felt". Logan Plant of IGN was also highly critical of the game overall, giving it a 5/10. He considered its technical performance one of the worst on the Switch, and he disliked Luigi's automated controls in the overworld, his role in puzzle-solving with the "Luigi Logic" mechanic, the game's writing, and what he described as a lack of originality in its locations. Other reviewers generally criticized the game's performance issues.

=== Sales ===
Mario & Luigi: Brothership was the bestselling retail game during its first week of release in Japan, with 63,441 physical copies being sold across the country. It sold 1.84 million copies as of December 31, 2024. As of March 31, 2025, it has sold over 1.94 million copies.
