= AlphaDream =

Japanese video game developer

AlphaDream Corporation, Ltd.
- Native name: 株式会社アルファドリーム
- Romanized name: Kabushiki gaisha ArufaDorīmu
- Type: Private
- Industry: Video games
- Predecessor: AlphaStar (video game division)
- Founded: January 12, 2000; 26 years ago, in Tokyo, Japan
- Defunct: October 1, 2019; 6 years ago
- Fate: Bankruptcy
- Headquarters: Wako Miyamasuzaka Building, 2-19-8, Shibuya, Tokyo, Japan
- Key people: Tetsuo Mizuno (president)
- Number of employees: 38 (2011)
- Website: alphadream.co.jp at the Wayback Machine (archived September 30, 2019)

AlphaDream Corporation, Ltd. (Note: Japanese: 株式会社アルファドリーム, Hepburn: Kabushikigaisha ArufaDorīmu) was a Japanese video game developer based in Tokyo. It was founded in 2000 by Square alumni Chihiro Fujioka and Tetsuo Mizuno. Closely associated with Nintendo throughout its existence, the company was known for their role-playing games, most notably the Mario & Luigi series for the Game Boy Advance, the Nintendo DS and the Nintendo 3DS. On October 1, 2019, AlphaDream was shut down after filing for bankruptcy.

== History ==
AlphaDream was a spinoff company from AlphaStar, (Note: 株式会社アルファスター, Kabushikigaisha ArufaSutā) a staffing agency that dealt in construction work also known as Mente Tomo and Ai. (Note: 株式会社メンテ友アンド愛, Kabushikigaisha Mente Yu ando Ai; A bilingual kanji pun: 友 (friend) and 愛 (love) can be read as "You" and "I") Chihiro Fujioka joined AlphaStar in 1999 to head up a video game production division. He and Tetsuo Mizuno spun the company off as AlphaStar Software on January 12, 2000, before renaming it to AlphaDream in July of that year. Several members of their staff had previously worked at Square, including Mizuno, Square's second president, and Fujioka and Yoshihiko Maekawa, who were game directors at Square. The name AlphaDream, meaning the 'first dream', is a play on Final Fantasy, Square's most popular series.

Their first game, Koto Battle, is a Pokémon-style role-playing game, wherein the player battles three of their twenty character cards against AI opponents. It was released in March 2001 for the Game Boy Color. It was later re-released for the Nintendo 3DS Virtual Console.

AlphaDream's next game was Tomato Adventure, released in January 2002. The player, as DeMille, a tomato-hater in the Ketchup Kingdom, fights his way from his outcast village to rescue his girlfriend. The in-game weapons are toy-like and the battles against opponents involve minigames. Tomato Adventure was co-developed with Graphic Research and directed by Chihiro Fujioka of Super Mario RPG and Final Fantasy Legend III. It was expected for release on the Game Boy Color as Gimmick Land, but was pushed to the new Game Boy Advance and renamed for better marketing. AlphaDream became the developer of the Mario & Luigi series of games shortly after, with the first entry in the series, Mario & Luigi: Superstar Saga, releasing in 2003.

On October 1, 2019, AlphaDream declared bankruptcy, citing sluggish revenues and high development costs, and being unable to keep up with growing debt (which as of March 2018 was over ¥465 million). The next game in the Mario & Luigi series, Mario & Luigi: Brothership, included some of the "original staff" according to Nintendo.

== Games ==
List of video games developed by AlphaDream
Year	Title	Publisher	Platform(s)
2001	Koto Battle: Tengai no Moribito	AlphaDream	Game Boy Color
2002	Tomato Adventure	Nintendo	Game Boy Advance
2003	Hamtaro: Rainbow Rescue	Nintendo	Game Boy Advance
2003	Mario & Luigi: Superstar Saga	Nintendo	Game Boy Advance
2004	Hamtaro: Ham-Ham Games	Nintendo	Game Boy Advance
2005	Mario & Luigi: Partners in Time	Nintendo	Nintendo DS
2005	Tottoko Hamtaro Nazo Nazo Q Kumonoue no ? Jou	Nintendo	Nintendo DS
2007	Hi Hamtaro! Ham-Ham Training	Marvelous Interactive	Nintendo DS
2009	Mario & Luigi: Bowser's Inside Story	Nintendo	Nintendo DS
2009	PostPet DS	Marvelous Entertainment	Nintendo DS
2013	Mario & Luigi: Dream Team	Nintendo	Nintendo 3DS
2015	Mario & Luigi: Paper Jam	Nintendo	Nintendo 3DS
2017	Mario & Luigi: Superstar Saga + Bowser's Minions	Nintendo	Nintendo 3DS
2018	Mario & Luigi: Bowser's Inside Story + Bowser Jr.'s Journey	Nintendo	Nintendo 3DS
2019	Kedama no Gonjiro: Fit & Run	ForwardWorks	Android
2019	Kedama no Gonjiro: Fit & Run	ForwardWorks	iOS
2019	Mario & Sonic at the Olympic Games Tokyo 2020	Sega	Nintendo Switch
