= Mario & Luigi =

Video game series

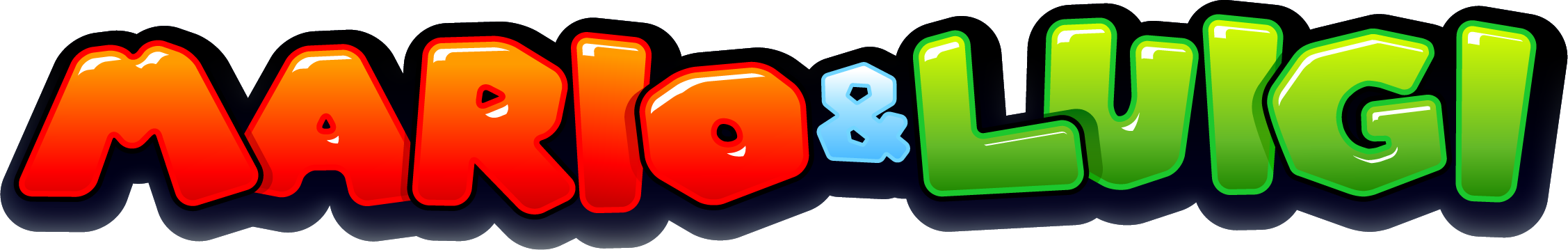
- Logo since 2013
- Genre: Role-playing
- Developers: AlphaDream (2003–2019); Acquire (2024)
- Publisher: Nintendo
- Platforms: Game Boy Advance; Nintendo DS; Nintendo 3DS; Nintendo Switch
- First release: Mario & Luigi: Superstar Saga; November 17, 2003
- Latest release: Mario & Luigi: Brothership; November 7, 2024
- Parent series: Mario; Luigi

Mario & Luigi (known as Mario & Luigi RPG in Japan) is a series of role-playing video games. It is published by Nintendo and was originally developed by AlphaDream prior to their bankruptcy, with Acquire developing the latest title. The series is a spin-off from Nintendo's trademark Super Mario series and stars the titular characters Mario and Luigi. Typically, the stories consist of following the two on a quest to rescue Princess Peach and defeat an antagonist. The games emphasise the simultaneous control of both protagonists, often providing the player with exploration and combat gameplay in the style of typical role-playing video games.

Mario & Luigi began in 2003 on the Game Boy Advance with Mario & Luigi: Superstar Saga. Due to the nature of the text-based story, the personalities of characters (particularly Luigi) were reworked specifically for the game. Several games were then developed by AlphaDream for the Nintendo DS and Nintendo 3DS from 2005 to 2019, with each game including a unique twist on the formula. The Nintendo Switch eventually received Mario & Luigi: Brothership, instead developed by Acquire, released in 2024, in which the art direction switched to a full 3D style. Two titles in the series, Mario & Luigi: Superstar Saga and Mario & Luigi: Bowser's Inside Story, were remade for the Nintendo 3DS with extra content, released in 2017 and 2019, respectively. The latter was the final game in the series to be developed by AlphaDream before they filed for bankruptcy in 2019.

All games were well-received by critics to varying degrees, with the initial three games attaining nominations for various awards (along with the remake of Mario & Luigi: Bowser's Inside Story). Both Mario & Luigi: Superstar Saga and Mario & Luigi: Bowser's Inside Story received "universal acclaim", according to review aggregation website Metacritic. The former has been considered to be one of the best Nintendo GBA games of all time, and the latter one of the best Nintendo DS games of all time.

== Gameplay ==
The gameplay of the Mario & Luigi series consists of typical role-playing elements, and primarily differs from most other role-playing video games (RPGs) through its focus on controlling Mario and Luigi simultaneously. During exploration and interaction with the world, known as the overworld, the player controls Mario's movement, with Luigi following closely. Mario and Luigi's other actions are controlled individually with the A (Mario) and B (Luigi) buttons, respectively, in both the overworld and battle sections. These controls are used to explore the overworld to solve puzzles and find collectibles using various special moves that often have Mario and Luigi working together.

Like many other RPG series, the Mario & Luigi series contains a traditional turn-based battle system. The games have a mechanic similar to the Paper Mario franchise, in which attacks are empowered by precisely timing inputs based on the attack's animation, including Mario and Luigi's signature jumps as well as hammer attacks. Unique to the series is the use of real-time commands while an enemy is attacking, rewarding the player's good timing with the ability to completely avoid an attack or even do damage to the enemy instead of getting hit and contrasting the usual turn-based combat. Some titles in the series feature additional playable characters alongside Mario and Luigi: Baby Mario and Baby Luigi in Mario & Luigi: Partners in Time, Bowser in Mario & Luigi: Bowser’s Inside Story, and Paper Mario in Mario & Luigi: Paper Jam.

== Games ==
Release timeline New main series entries in bold
2003	**Superstar Saga** (GBA)
2004
2005	**Partners in Time** (DS)
2006–2008
2009	**Bowser's Inside Story** (DS)
2010–2012
2013	**Dream Team** (3DS)
2014
2015	**Paper Jam** (3DS)
2016
2017	Superstar Saga + Bowser's Minions (3DS)
2018
2019	Bowser's Inside Story + Bowser Jr.'s Journey (3DS)
2020–2023
2024	**Brothership** (Switch)

=== Main games ===
- **Mario & Luigi: Superstar Saga** was released on the Game Boy Advance in 2003. It follows the journey of Mario and Luigi as they attempt to track down Cackletta, who stole the voice of Princess Peach. It established the gameplay formula that would be iterated on throughout the series, including the (often simultaneous) control of multiple characters, puzzles, and dodging enemy attacks during turn-based combat through well-timed inputs.
- **Mario & Luigi: Partners in Time** was the first Nintendo DS title and released in 2005. The introduction of Baby Mario and Baby Luigi doubles the number of simultaneously playable characters to four, with the option to separate into pairs. Set in the Mushroom Kingdom, the plot incorporates time-travel elements, as Mario and Luigi must rescue Princess Peach after she is sent back in time by the alien "Shroobs".
- **Mario & Luigi: Bowser's Inside Story** released for the Nintendo DS in 2009. Antagonist Fawful causes Bowser to inhale several Mushroom Kingdom inhabitants, including Mario, Luigi, and Princess Peach. It partially follows Mario and Luigi, sometimes through two-dimensional gameplay taking place inside of Bowser, with other sections instead following Bowser's perspective via three-dimensional gameplay sections.
- **Mario & Luigi: Dream Team** was the first Nintendo 3DS game and released in 2013. Alternating between the real world (within Pi'illo Island) and the dream world, Mario pursues damsel-in-distress Princess Peach with frequent help from Dreamy Luigi. In the dream world, the touch screen is utilised to tug on Luigi's moustache as he sleeps, in order to control various aspects of the world such as palm tree branches and the flow of time.
- **Mario & Luigi: Paper Jam** was released in 2015 on the Nintendo 3DS. Princess Peach and her paper counterpart are captured by Bowser and Paper Bowser, so Paper Mario joins Mario and Luigi to save them. Controlling the three characters simultaneously, the player may use "trio combos" in battle while acquiring boosts through "battle-cards". Some puzzles in the overworld take the form of minigames.
- **Mario & Luigi: Brothership** released in 2024 for the Nintendo Switch. It follows Mario and Luigi's mission to reconnect the islands of Concordia, accessed by sailing a moving island. It introduces mechanics such as "Luigi logic", where for the first time in the series, Luigi may act independently from the player during gameplay, and "battle plugs" which provide boosts in combat with a limited number of uses before needing to be recharged.

=== Remakes ===
- **Mario & Luigi: Superstar Saga + Bowser's Minions** is a Nintendo 3DS remake of Mario & Luigi: Superstar Saga and released in 2017. It adds the side mode Minion Quest: The Search for Bowser, involving forming a horde of troops to battle against a horde of enemies, with three types of troops, strong and weak to one another in a rock-paper-scissors fashion.
- **Mario & Luigi: Bowser's Inside Story + Bowser Jr.'s Journey** is a Nintendo 3DS remake of Mario & Luigi: Bowser's Inside Story and was released in 2019. The additional side mode Bowser Jr.'s Journey is present, playing similarly to Minion Quest, with additional special moves.

== Recurring characters ==
=== Fawful ===
Fawful, (Note: Japanese: ゲラコビッツ, Hepburn: Gerakobittsu) known in Japan as Gerakobits, is a recurring antagonist. The character is considered to be "insane", and speaks in a chaotic manner. He served as the secondary antagonist of Superstar Saga, and the main antagonist of Bowser's Inside Story, with a minor appearance in Partners in Time. He was also the main antagonist of Bowser’s Minions, in which he brainwashed all of Bowser's minions, and became Captain Goomba’s archenemy.

He was created by Masanori Sato, who worked as the illustrator for Mario & Luigi: Superstar Saga, the first game in the Mario & Luigi series. Fawful's localized Japanese name, Gerakobits, is derived from geragera, the Japanese onomatopoeia for a scornful laugh. Because Fawful was not based on any existing characters in the Mario series, the Nintendo Treehouse, which is responsible for localizing games for North American audiences, had more creative freedom in writing for the character. Bill Trinen and Nate Bihldorff, employees of the Treehouse, wrote the English dialogue for Fawful through the exchange of notes. Rather than sticking close to the Japanese script, where Fawful simply adds "Fururururu!" to the end of every line, Trinen and Bihldorff intended to make Fawful as "wacky" and "zany" as possible in the Western release. Thus, in English versions of the games, all of Fawful's dialogue consists of broken English and word salads, along with his catchphrase, "I have fury!".

=== Popple ===
Popple, (Note: Japanese: ポップル, Hepburn: Poppuru) or the Shadow Thief as he calls himself, is a recurring antagonist. He first appears as a major antagonist in Mario & Luigi: Superstar Saga where he is fought four times throughout the game, and fights alongside an amnesiac Bowser, going under the alias "Rookie", for the first two battles. However, after Popple and Bowser get separated, Popple recruits Birdo to fight alongside him for the fourth battle; following his defeat and unseen arrest, he is forced to do community service in Little Fungi Town. Popple later returns in Mario & Luigi: Dream Team as a minor antagonist. He is first seen robbing Pi'illoper’s house and encounters the Bros., though he does not seem to remember them. Later on, he works with the Bros. to battle a Wiggler named Wiggly, but he turns against them after Wiggly is defeated. In his English dialogue for Superstar Saga, Popple's manner of speech parodies the "wise guy" dialect used by actor Edward G. Robinson in gangster films such as Little Caesar, often interjecting "see" at the ends of his sentences.

=== Starlow ===
Starlow (Note: Japanese: イエロースター, Hepburn: Ierō Sutā; lit. 'Yellow Star') is a recurring companion character. She first appears in Bowser's Inside Story where she is introduced as a representative of the Star Sprites, a species of spherical beings with stars above their heads. She is inhaled by Bowser alongside the rest of the cast and functions as a companion and helper for the rest of the game, communicating with Bowser on behalf of the brothers under the pseudonym Chippy (Note: チッピー, Chippī) to hide her identity and prevent Bowser from learning his arch-rivals are inside him. She has appeared in every subsequent game in the series, being a friend and companion to Princess Peach after the events of Bowser's Inside Story. In Dream Team and Paper Jam, she accompanies the brothers similar to Bowser's Inside Story while staying with Peach throughout Brothership. She has minor appearances in Bowser’s Minions, where she is available as a unit, and Bowser Jr.'s Journey. Having been in every game since her first appearance, she is the original character with the most occurrences in the series, appearing in six out of eight games.

== Development ==
=== 2000–2003: AlphaDream founding, conception, and first game ===
AlphaDream was founded in January 2000 by Tetsuo Mizuno, Square's former president. Square had previously developed Super Mario RPG, the first role-playing game (RPG) starring characters from the Mario series. After a number of smaller games, Mario & Luigi: Superstar Saga was AlphaDream's first game to be released outside of Japan on November 17, 2003.

The Mario & Luigi series took inspiration from Super Mario RPG when it came to turn-based combat, which AlphaDream producer Yoshihiko Maekawa co-directed. In an interview, he remarked that one inspiration for Super Mario RPG was a children's toy in Japan where buttons had to be pressed in time with the music. From there, he conceptualized turn-based mechanics that blended real-time action with general RPG gameplay by allowing the player to make timed button presses to be more successful in their attacks. AlphaDream iterated on this timed button-pressing concept for Mario & Luigi: Superstar Saga by letting the player dodge enemy attacks entirely.

When it came to characters in the Mario franchise at the time, they were generally underdeveloped personality-wise. Since Mario & Luigi mainly employs a text-based story, and would see the duo interacting with many different characters across the storyline, AlphaDream wished to approach the characters from scratch. With Nintendo's approval and support, characters such as Luigi were reworked by the team, attempting to stay true to what originally made them charming to fans.

Partners in Time attempted to innovate on the formula set by Superstar Saga by introducing baby counterparts to Mario and Luigi, doubling the amount of characters the player controls simultaneously.

=== 2004–2009: Nintendo DS era ===
Nintendo revealed Mario & Luigi: Partners in Time (then called Mario & Luigi 2) at E3 2005, where a playable demonstration of the game was available. The demo consisted of three levels, each accompanied by a tutorial to guide the player. Each level had a different objective and represented the characters' abilities in the game, such as the use of the hammer. Between the game's unveiling at E3 and its release, Nintendo of America revealed details of the game relating to Partners in Time's plot and gameplay, as well as the fact that it would be compatible with the "Rumble Pak" feature. Partners in Time was first released in North America on November 28, 2005. Mario & Luigi: Bowser's Inside Story was revealed to be in development in October 2008 in Japan at Nintendo's Tokyo Press Event under the temporary title Mario & Luigi 3. The North America and Europe release was announced at the E3 2009 event and it released on September 15, 2009.

=== 2010–2015: Nintendo 3DS era ===
Mario & Luigi: Dream Team released on June 30, 2013. With the introduction of three-dimensional graphics on the Nintendo 3DS, AlphaDream was given the opportunity to change their two-dimensional sprites to three-dimensions with the updated hardware. However, Maekawa believed the company not only got very good at designing sprites due to limited graphical capability on prior consoles, but they also helped convey comical expressions, so they were kept, and only the world assets were fit to 3D for the next installment. Akira Otani, a producer of the series, considered the animation to be the main reasoning for the extensive development process of Mario & Luigi: Dream Team. He mentioned how it takes up to six people to design the animations for the characters alone.

When it came to Mario & Luigi: Dream Team, the underlying goal was to put emphasis more on Luigi, as Maekawa considered him to have less depth even after the reworking of his character. One of the first ideas suggested for the game's gimmick was having a large number of Luigis on-screen at one time, an idea that became more feasible with time due to advancing hardware. They began coming up with ideas for a context where having multiple Luigis would make sense, and they decided on having the game take place inside a dream. Due to the limitless potential of a dream world, coming up with level ideas was simple. This also helped with idea brainstorming for new attacks; director Hiroyuki Kubota mentioned a prototype for an attack involving Luigis coming together to form a volcano that would erupt, but it was scrapped as it was deemed too hard to control and not as fun as they wanted.

During development of the second 3DS title Mario & Luigi: Paper Jam, released on January 22, 2016, production was overseen by Paper Mario series developer Intelligent Systems. According to the developers, Mario & Luigi: Paper Jam was created not only to make a crossover between the Mario & Luigi and Paper Mario series, but additionally to introduce the gimmick of having a third character to control simultaneously, stemming from the idea of using the third button to control a second Mario. The team was keen on not sacrificing simplicity for extra content, one of the ultimate goals for both the Mario & Luigi and Paper Mario series. When one of the prototypes of the game that involved rapid and sudden button presses was presented to Shigeru Miyamoto, he turned the concept down and asked for it to be simpler.

=== 2016–2019: Remakes and studio closure ===
Following Mario & Luigi: Paper Jam, AlphaDream began work on releasing remakes of older games in the series, with Mario & Luigi: Superstar Saga + Bowser's Minions releasing on October 5, 2017. Another remake followed, being Mario & Luigi: Bowser's Inside Story + Bowser Jr.'s Journey, which was released on January 11, 2019 for the Nintendo 3DS. The team did consider releasing it on the Nintendo Switch, but eventually decided otherwise, mainly in favor of keeping the dual-screen aspect of the original games. Bowser Jr. is the focus of the side story because they wanted to build the parent-child narrative between him and Bowser. AlphaDream decided to skip Mario & Luigi: Partners in Time due to Mario & Luigi: Bowser's Inside Story being the most successful game in the series at the time, and due to positive overseas reception of the antagonist Fawful.

"The Mario & Luigi games were on a decline - a source once mentioned to me that this year's Bowser's Inside Story remake sold so badly that Nintendo axed other 3DS plans due to it."

— Writer Imran Khan, Game Informer, 2019

From 2018 to 2019, AlphaDream began searching for people to hire, including graphic designers and production assistants with the intention of future games for the Nintendo Switch and smartphones. The remake Mario & Luigi: Bowser's Inside Story + Bowser Jr's Journey sold poorly and was one of the worst-selling Mario games in Japan. Other release plans for the 3DS were cancelled because of the low sales, also marking the last Mario game on the console. By March 2018, Yahoo! Japan reported AlphaDream was £3.5 million in debt (US$4.3 million) due to development costs, leading to the company filing for bankruptcy in October 2019. In January 2020, Nintendo filed a trademark for the series in Argentina, and while most assumed Nintendo was simply protecting their IP, it also led to speculation that the series would hopefully continue on a later date.

=== 2024: Nintendo Switch era ===
In June 2024, the sixth installment in the series, Mario & Luigi: Brothership, was announced. Nintendo noted that "some of the original developers" from the franchise were involved in the development of Mario & Luigi: Brothership. It was then released on November 7, 2024 on the Nintendo Switch; the first game in the series not developed by the now-defunct AlphaDream. It was later revealed that Mario & Luigi: Brothership was developed by Acquire; the information was found in the game's intellectual property notices. With this title, the art-style shifted to full 3D, with Akira Otani commenting that a HD-2D style akin to Octopath Traveler was once considered but scrapped.

== Reception ==
Aggregate review scores As of November 5, 2025.
Game	Year	Metacritic	OpenCritic
Mario & Luigi: Superstar Saga	2003	90/100	N/A
Mario & Luigi: Partners in Time	2005	86/100	N/A
Mario & Luigi: Bowser's Inside Story	2009	90/100	N/A
Mario & Luigi: Dream Team	2013	81/100	N/A
Mario & Luigi: Paper Jam	2015	76/100	54% recommend
Mario & Luigi: Superstar Saga + Bowser's Minions	2017	81/100	83% recommend
Mario & Luigi: Bowser's Inside Story + Bowser Jr.'s Journey	2018	84/100	95% recommend
Mario & Luigi: Brothership	2024	77/100	67% recommend

All games in the series have received a positive reception. According to the review aggregation website Metacritic, Mario & Luigi: Superstar Saga and Mario & Luigi: Bowser's Inside Story received "universal acclaim", while all other games received "generally favorable reviews", with Mario & Luigi: Paper Jam holding the lowest rating.

Both GameSpot and Eurogamer called Mario & Luigi: Superstar Saga "one of the best GBA games of the year". GameSpot remarked on the unique mechanics and gameplay ideas, while Eurogamer praised its "simple and ingenious design".

The DS sequel Mario & Luigi: Partners in Time was similarly well-received, with GamesRadar+ celebrating its comedic dialogue and story, although Nintendo World Report disagreed with the balance of the game's special item type, known as Bros. items. The next DS entry, Mario & Luigi: Bowser's Inside Story, was critically acclaimed with Giant Bomb stating that, while the series' underlying formula is kept the same, it stays fresh with small but unique additions. Game Informer found the touch screen and microphone features to be well-implemented and natural-feeling.

Following the launch of the 3DS title Mario & Luigi: Dream Team, IGN both praised and questioned the game's abundance of introducing ideas "only to then put them to one side", resulting in an "uneven experience" that occasionally lead to great moments. Nintendo Life commented on the apparent care that went into the game while also admitting that they felt "it flirts with going too far", recommending it highly, but mainly to those who are "dedicated, obsessive fans". Digitally Downloaded said Mario & Luigi: Paper Jam was still as fun and varied as previous titles, yet lacked an interesting initial plot hook, and IGN similarly thought that environments felt uninspired, compounded with a bland story. GamesRadar+ believed that the addition of Paper Mario as a character would keep things fresh for veterans.

Critics reviewed the remakes Mario & Luigi: Superstar Saga + Bowser's Minions and Mario & Luigi: Bowser's Inside Story + Bowser Jr.'s Journey highly, but not as highly as the respective originals due to the underwhelming bonus modes. The former was said to be "a game that deserves to be enjoyed by a new generation" by Polygon, but the Bowser's Minions component was criticised as a "dead weight" on the remake for its monotonous fights and tedious grinding. Similarly, Destructoid found Mario & Luigi: Bowser's Inside Story + Bowser Jr.'s Journey retained all good qualities of the original, but was overall hard to recommend to series veterans as Bowser Jr.'s Journey wasn't a worthwhile enough bonus.

Reviews for Mario & Luigi: Brothership remained generally positive, though some publications expressed displeasure with the pacing of Mario & Luigi: Brothership, with Gamereactor stating that the game had highlights but risks abandonment due to questionable balance and bland side-quests. The gameplay was enjoyed by Twinfinite, appreciating the diverse settings and fresh-feeling boss battles, while Shacknews commented on the game's "unforgettable story" and "lovable characters". By February 4, 2025, the game had sold 1.84 million copies.

The Mario RPG games directly inspired the 2025 title Clair Obscur: Expedition 33's enemy parrying mechanic, according to Sandfall Interactive creative director Guillaume Broche.

=== Awards and nominations ===
Year	Publication or ceremony	Nominated game	Award	Result	Ref.
2004	D.I.C.E. Awards	Mario & Luigi: Superstar Saga	Handheld Game of the Year	Nominated	
2006	D.I.C.E. Awards	Mario & Luigi: Partners in Time	Handheld Game of the Year	Nominated	
2010	D.I.C.E. Awards	Mario & Luigi: Bowser's Inside Story	Outstanding Achievement in Game Design	Nominated	
2010	D.I.C.E. Awards	Mario & Luigi: Bowser's Inside Story	Portable Game of the Year	Nominated	
2010	D.I.C.E. Awards	Mario & Luigi: Bowser's Inside Story	Role-Playing/Massively Multiplayer Game of the Year	Nominated	
2010	British Academy Games Awards	Mario & Luigi: Bowser's Inside Story	Best Handheld Game	Nominated	
2019	NAVGTR	Mario & Luigi: Bowser's Inside Story + Bowser Jr.'s Journey	Writing in a Comedy	Nominated	
2019	New York Game Awards	Mario & Luigi: Bowser's Inside Story + Bowser Jr.'s Journey	Best Remake	Nominated	
