= Mario & Luigi: Dream Team =

2013 video game

- Developers: AlphaDream; Good-Feel (giant battles)
- Publisher: Nintendo
- Director: Hiroyuki Kubota
- Producers: Akira Otani; Yoshihiko Maekawa; Toshiharu Izuno
- Programmer: Makoto Aioi
- Artist: Akira Noguchi
- Writer: Hiroyuki Kubota
- Composer: Yoko Shimomura
- Series: Mario & Luigi
- Platform: Nintendo 3DS
- Release: EU: July 12, 2013; JP: July 18, 2013; NA: August 11, 2013
- Genre: Role-playing
- Mode: Single-player

Mario & Luigi: Dream Team, (Note: Known in Japan as Mario & Luigi RPG 4: Dream Adventure (マリオ&ルイージRPG4 ドリームアドベンチャー, Mario ando Ruīji Aru Pī Jī Fō: Dorīmu Adobenchā)) known in Europe and Australia as Mario & Luigi: Dream Team Bros., is a 2013 role-playing video game developed by AlphaDream and published by Nintendo for the Nintendo 3DS. The successor to Mario & Luigi: Bowser's Inside Story (2009), it is the fourth installment in the Mario & Luigi series, and a part of the larger Mario franchise.

The story of Dream Team follows Mario and his brother—Luigi who, after being invited to Pi'illo Island for a vacation, become embroiled in a journey to retrieve a powerful artifact before Bowser and Antasma use it for evil intentions. The gameplay takes place from a top-down perspective and has the player controlling Mario and Luigi simultaneously, solving puzzles and platformer sections and overcoming turn-based battles across Pi'illo Island, the game's overworld. The player also makes use of Luigi's dreams, called the "Dream World", where gameplay shifts to a two-dimensional side-scrolling perspective and emphasizes using Luigi-based gimmicks to their advantage. Combat in both worlds is turn-based.

Dream Team was made to emphasize Luigi due to the developer's decision to focus solely on Mario and Luigi as characters and the feeling that Luigi was often underrepresented in the series. The original notion was to make a scenario involving multiple Luigis on-screen at one time, and as more Luigi-themed ideas were conceptualized, a dream setting was set to justify their inclusion. The worldbuilding was redesigned to be three-dimensional—a first for the series, but characters retained their two-dimensional qualities with newly added stereoscopic depth. Characters were made to not only push the limits of comical expression but to test the restrictions of Nintendo's intellectual property team. The game was announced at E3 2013 and released in July internationally and early August in North America. Its release was made to coincide with the Year of Luigi, the 30th anniversary celebration of the character that saw many Luigi-oriented titles and merchandise.

Critical reception of Dream Team was generally positive—being praised for its writing, characters, combat, and Dream World portions, with mixed opinions on graphics and worldbuilding, and criticism for its excessive amount of tutorials. Sales debuted well in early months but failed to meet Nintendo's expectations; as of 2023, the game has sold 2.7 million copies and is one of the best-selling games on the Nintendo 3DS. The series' next original installment, Mario & Luigi: Paper Jam, was released in 2015 for the Nintendo 3DS.

== Gameplay ==
Dreamy Luigi assumes the formation of a vine (top). The player is interacting with Luigi's mustache (bottom), causing the vine to extend.

Mario & Luigi: Dream Team features top-down role-playing gameplay similar to previous Mario & Luigi titles; the player simultaneously controls Mario and Luigi, who are mapped to separate buttons on the Nintendo 3DS. Mario and Luigi explore the game's setting, Pi'illo Island in an overworld fashion, with the island's locales acting as individual levels. The overworld contains puzzles and minigames for the player to complete, and some platforming elements that hinder progression. As the game progresses, the duo will learn some new "Bros. Attacks", which are incorporated into solving puzzles or reaching previously inaccessible areas.

To save the inhabitants of Pi'illo Island, Mario is required to enter the "Dream World", which takes place within Luigi's dreams, and Mario is aided by the Luigi of the Dream World, "Dreamy Luigi". Dream World aspects are two-dimensional and are centered around platforming, and are visible on the top screen of the Nintendo 3DS. On the bottom screen is a sleeping Luigi, and when the player interacts with him using the touchscreen, aspects of the Dream World are affected. For example, making Luigi sneeze will cause a gust of wind to blow. Mario can take command of an increasingly populated group of Luigis known as "Luiginoids", which takes on new abilities and forms as the game progresses, such as smashing through blocks and rolling downhill in a ball formation.

Combat in Dream Team is turn-based; when the duo encounters an enemy in both worlds a battle sequence will commence. The player can obtain various weaponry and utilities on Pi'illo Island that aid in battle and help give an advantage over the enemy. When an attack is selected, the player must use timed button presses to successfully execute the attack and maximize damage to the enemy. Bros. Attacks learned in the overworld can also be used in battle, which require more complex inputs but deal more damage. The player can also use varying inputs to defend them from enemy attacks or to avoid taking damage entirely. In the Dream World, Mario battles alone against groups of enemies and attacks once per turn, however, he is aided by the Luiginoids, who boost his basic attacks and stats. In place of the Bros. Attacks are "Luiginary Attacks", which also incorporate the Luiginoids, such as tilting the console to steer a rolling ball of Luiginoids to run over an enemy. Boss battles involve turning the 3DS sideways in a portrait-style manner, and Dreamy Luigi assumes a giant formation to defeat another enemy of the same size. Dream Team offers an easy and hard mode, which determines the difficulty of combat and boss battles.

== Plot ==
One day, Mario, Luigi, Princess Peach, and Toadsworth are invited to Pi'illo Island by Dr. Snoozemore, the island's proprietor, for a vacation. They arrive and meet up with Broque Monsieur, who escorts them to Pi'illo Castle. Peach and Toadsworth accidentally trigger a moving platform which brings them deep into the underground ruins beneath the castle and Mario and Luigi pursue them. They reunite and discover a secret collection room with relics from the ancient Pi'illo Kingdom. Distracted, Luigi sleeps on a bed on display in the room, which opens up a portal to the Dream World. A dark figure emerges from the portal and kidnaps Peach; Mario chases after them. He meets Dreamy Luigi, who decides to guide Mario through the Dream World. While searching for Peach, Mario saves Prince Dreambert, who tells the two that Pi'illo Island receives its aforementioned sleep powers via the "Dream Stone" and the "Dark Stone", both of which also have the power to grant wishes. He also tells them about Antasma, the bat-like villain that was detained in the Dream World after destroying the Dark Stone, who has escaped and is looking for the Dream Stone, intending to use it for power. Mario and Luigi, with the aid of Dreamy Luigi in the Dream World, trek to find the Dream Stone before Antasma can. Meanwhile, Bowser and his army arrive at Pi'illo Island to kidnap Peach as well; he meets Antasma by coincidence and the two team up to find the Dream Stone. After a brief skirmish with Mario and Luigi, the duo retreat to the real world to pursue the Dream Stone.

Mario and Luigi discover the location of the Dream Stone, but Antasma and Bowser steal it and flee to a nearby mountain before the duo could reach it. At the stone's original location was a "Dreampoint", which are spread across Pi'illo Island for navigation between both worlds. They enter the Dream World to find the soul of the Dream Stone, who informs them of Antasma's whereabouts. Antasma postpones their arrival by playing music that makes Mario and Luigi (as well as the rest of the island) fall asleep, with their dreams powering the Dream Stone. The Dream Stone reaches full power, and Antasma and Bowser use it to wish for an impenetrable castle in the sky, named "Neo Bowser Castle". After Mario and Luigi wake up, they try to hide Princess Peach deep into the dream world, only to be informed by Kamek that Bowser already captured the Princess.

Mario and Luigi are met by Dr. Snoozemore, who suggests they find the "Zeekeeper", a mythical birdlike being who can destroy the castle's impenetrable barrier. After rescuing Dreambert's friend Bedsmith, who assembles a special bed that allows one to sleep soundly, they set the bed up in a sacred region of the forest. When they summon the Zeekeeper, it is initially hostile; after learning that they are friends of Prince Dreambert, it decides to help them by shooting a powerful beam and destroys the barrier, causing the castle to fall and land on the island. When they enter the castle and overcome obstacles created by Kamek, they find Bowser and Antasma. Bowser reveals that he planned on double-crossing Antasma all along, takes the Dream Stone, and flees to the castle's roof. Antasma attempts to escape through a Dreampoint, but is defeated by Mario and Dreamy Luigi. They reach the roof where Bowser and Peach are located, and as Bowser boasts about his newfound power, Peach uses the stone to wish for it to be shattered. In retaliation, Bowser consumes the pieces and transforms into "Dreamy Bowser". He is ultimately defeated and launched into the sky, and the group escapes the castle before it collapses. They return to Pi'illo Castle in an attempt to repair the Dream Stone, but the Zeekeeper creates a "Dream Coin" instead, which generates infinite coins, much to Dreambert's shock. Everyone decides the change is for the better, believing that being able to wish for anything is too much power and that simply buying what they wanted would be better. Meanwhile, Bowser attempts to escape the island via a Koopa Clown Car, but coins begin to rain from the sky because of the Dream Coin. This causes his minions onboard to shake the vehicle while trying to grab the falling coins, to the point that it crashes into the ocean.

== Development and release ==
Mario & Luigi: Dream Team, like prior Mario & Luigi titles, was developed by AlphaDream and published by Nintendo. The release of Dream Team coincided with the Year of Luigi in 2013, intended to celebrate the 30th anniversary of the creation of Luigi. The game was announced at E3 2013 for an international release of July the same year, and August in North America. It released July 12 and 13 for Europe and Japan, respectively, and August 11 for North America. A demo was also made available on the Nintendo eShop. After the game's release, Nintendo launched a Nintendo 3DS XL themed after the game with Dream Team installed on it. In addition, they released relaxation kits containing a blanket, blanket case, and blindfold for their Club Nintendo rewards program in Europe, themed after Luigi and Princess Peach. In Europe and Australia, the game is titled Mario & Luigi: Dream Team Bros.

=== Concept ===
After finishing the previous title in the Mario & Luigi series, Bowser's Inside Story, AlphaDream began considering new ideas for another Mario & Luigi entry. Due to the spike in popularity because of Bowser's Inside Story, the developers conceptualized ideas that all involved Bowser; game director Akira Otani, fearing that the series was steering in the wrong direction, restricted the developers from using any game ideas centralizing characters outside of Mario or Luigi. With this restriction, the developers conceptualized the idea of "having a lot of Luigis on the screen that you could control and who would run around", according to game director Hiroyuki Kubota. They found the idea to be too complicated for the low processing power of the Nintendo DS; since development took place immediately after Bowser's Inside Story, Nintendo released the Nintendo 3DS during the process, and they ported the contents over to the new console. They found this to be the better choice, as the 3DS was much more graphically powerful. While considering a concept for Dream Team, they considered situations that would justify having multiple Luigis on screen at one time, and eventually settled on a setting that took place within a dream. Due to a dream world being an open-ended setting, the developers easily came up with numerous gimmicks that could take place inside of it.

The development process began with conceiving numerous ideas, and sketching out and discussing ones that seemed promising. The designers would then create a prototype, and anything unmanageable or difficult to control would be cut. For example, one idea that made it to the prototype stage was a volcano formed out of Luigis that would "erupt" and shoot more Luigis at enemies, but was cut for not controlling well. Dream Team's first prototype involved the player guiding a large number of Luigis to an end goal without losing any in the process—this was considered a unique experience, but not one to base an entire game around. In comparison to previous titles in the Mario & Luigi series, which often used Luigi to the expense of gags, the developers tried to make sure Luigi was just as important as Mario in Dream Team. When the game's second prototype centered around controlling Luigi's face on the bottom screen to change elements on the top, Otani was originally against it due to it going against this philosophy. According to Otani, the game was redrafted to the beginning numerous times.

=== Gameplay and graphics ===
In the original installments of the Mario & Luigi series, both Mario and Luigi alongside other non-player characters were two-dimensional sprites due to graphical limitations. With graphical power increasing with the Nintendo 3DS hardware, the graphic designers were no longer confined to using such two-dimensional designs and could switch to three-dimensional characters; however, the developers decided against making the change, due to the fact that two-dimensional sprites better conveyed comedic facial expressions. The development of Dream Team began prior to the discovery of the 3DS's advancements, so the developers instead used three-dimensional modeling for the game's worldbuilding and locales. Six graphic designers had to redesign each character using stereoscopic depth to look as if they were three-dimensional so they would stand out less in comparison to the environment; most animations were done by hand for Mario and Luigi, such as how Luigi has an "L" on his cap and Mario iconically raises his left hand while jumping, therefore meaning animations could not simply be mirrored. According to the developers, this was one of the main reasons why Dream Team took three years to complete.

In an interview with USGamer, producer Akira Ohtani explained that tutorials on minuscule topics, such as how to jump, are vital for younger audiences that are also playing the game and were included as such. The developers tried to find ways to work tutorials into the storyline to avoid breaking up the flow of the main storyline. Many features to help aid in difficult aspects of the game, such as a slow mode for timing in combat, were also emphasized. Touching on the subject with Kotaku, they used Dream Team to experiment with what amount of tutorials are needed, and that the data would be incorporated into the next title.

=== Writing and characters ===
The game's dialogue, more specifically the humor, was written with an international audience in mind and was designed to appeal to any age and national demographic. According to North American translator Nate Bihldorff, the writers were successful in doing so and very few translation changes were needed. One instance, however, had Bihldorff changing a character duo into stereotypical Russian strongmen to better justify their short catchphrases.

Characters were conceptualized by a specific graphic designer, and their character designs were reviewed by Kubota to see if they could work well within a specific location of the game. The reviewing process mainly came down to "if they have that Mario & Luigi feel" according to Kubota, and whether or not their sprite design could be used for a "range of comical expressiveness". When approved, the designs were sent to the stricter intellectual property (IP) team at Nintendo; Kubota usually kept designs from being too out of the ordinary, but oftentimes attempted to push the limits of the IP team, usually leading to failure. One major restriction that AlphaDream themselves imposed on the designers was to exclude explicit and indirect vulgarity. The developers also re-introduced characters from older Mario & Luigi titles as minor characters to appeal to older fans of the series.

== Reception ==
Reception

Aggregate scores
Aggregator	Score
GameRankings	80.65%(3DS)
Metacritic	81/100

Review scores
Publication	Score
Eurogamer	7/10
Game Informer	8.5/10
GameSpot	8/10
GamesRadar+	4/5
IGN	8/10
Nintendo Life	9/10
VentureBeat	90/100

=== Critical reviews ===
Mario & Luigi: Dream Team received an 81/100 on review aggregator website Metacritic based on 75 critics, indicating "generally favorable reviews".

Reviewers praised the game's characters and their diverse and defined personality traits. Justin Towell of GamesRadar+ gave the game four stars out of five, describing the game's nature as "laid-back" but complimenting the vibrant art style, superb soundtrack, and cartoon-like character expressions. GameSpot's Mark Walton applauded the characters found in the Dream World, and felt they populated the area well by being diverse in nature, which made exploration overall more enjoyable. Writing for VentureBeat, Stephanie Carmichael considered that Dream Team celebrated the Year of Luigi successfully with how the game used the Dream World to emphasize a contrast between real-world Luigi and his Dream World variant, where he is much more charismatic and talented. Nintendo Life's Thomas Whitehead liked the fact that the game never took its antagonists seriously and the diversity of personality among them. In contrast, the plot length was criticized, in part due to the use of tedious plot aspects and excessive tutorials. Whitehead believed the plot was too long, but interesting dialogue kept the story from feeling excessive in length; however, certain side quests felt tedious in comparison. Carmichael often found that the game required back-tracking to an unnecessary degree, especially towards the game's final hours. Simon Parkin of Eurogamer and Daniel Krupa of IGN felt that the excessive use of tutorials made Dream Team begin slowly, but the game fell into a "satisfying rhythm", according to Parkin, when the tutorials were completed.

Game Informer's Dan Ryckert felt that the use of stat increase and properly timed minigames offered a necessary distraction from the main storyline. Likewise, Whitehead positively recalled the amount of obtainable weaponry and utilities, and how the choice of Easy and Hard difficulty gave the game a change of pace. Krupa, similar to previous titles, called the concept of controlling Mario and Luigi simultaneously "surprisingly intuitive", even more so with the new mechanics introduced.

The combat was lauded amongst critics for its use of player interaction and engagement. Whitehead found the Bros. Attacks were successfully weaved into its platforming elements. Parkin praised the game's decision to use timing-based skill instead of tactical strategy, a form of combat he considered unique and what helped Dream Team set itself apart from other RPGs. Ryckert revered the variety of attack options and gimmicks, which made every combat scenario enjoyable. While Walton personally noted a lack of variety, the use of constant player engagement made up for it. Krupa enjoyed how each battle was unique, with each enemy having different weaknesses and perks that helped keep combat fresh all throughout gameplay. Carmichael also praised the combat in a similar fashion; the timing aspect fared well in comparison to other RPGs that merely involved button mashing, and the addition of three-dimensional graphics allowed for more innovative abilities. However, she derided the boss battles, which were too generic and difficult to be enjoyable.

Gameplay mechanics and the use of Luigi-based gimmicks in the game's dream aspects were also well received. Ryckert likened the dream phases to old Super Mario titles, and especially enjoyed the use of Dreamy Luigi interaction for more platforming opportunities. Parkin felt that Luigi-based gimmicks were often too restricted and did not leave much experimental opportunity for the player. Walton found the Dream World and its respective gimmicks to be the best part of the game, which offered diverse content that stood out from other Mario & Luigi titles. Ryckert lauded the various gimmicks oriented around Luigi in the Dream World and how they helped break up the storyline's pacing successfully. He, alongside Whitehead, also singled out a specific gameplay element that had the player rotate the 3DS sideways to display portrait-style gameplay, which they considered one of many "stand-out moments". Towell praised the various use and amount of gimmicks in both universes but ultimately felt they were used too well, making the platforming sessions dull in comparison. Some critics, however, felt the dream gimmick was not used to its full potential. Although Krupa saw the Dream World gimmicks to be unique and worthy of exploring further, they felt the game oftentimes moved on from them too quickly to allow each mechanic to be used to its full potential. According to him, "There's no room for invention and improvisation – it just tells you which power to use and when. It feels a waste of some really fantastic mechanics."

Graphics and worldbuilding were given mixed opinions; while some found them diverse and unique, others found them uninspired. Carmichael called Dream Team "a wonderland of 3D graphics, color, and sound", and said the Dream World took the worldbuilding "to the next level". Contrarily, Parkin believed the function of having two universes to traverse through was successfully executed, but graphics in both worlds were jagged and unappealing. Krupa found the Dream World to be much more engaging than the real-world counterpart, which was much duller and graphically uninteresting in comparison.

=== Sales ===
According to sales tracker Media Create, Dream Team sold just under 100,000 copies in its first week in Japan, double the sales of the runner-ups on their chart, Yo-kai Watch and Pikmin 3, the latter of which released for the Wii U. Despite the chart-topping placement, this was below Nintendo's expectations; Bowser's Inside Story sold roughly 200,000 in its opening week, and 392,200 copies of Dream Team were shipped to stores in Japan. Only twenty-five percent of the stock was sold, and Media Create suggested that this may have been due to Pikmin 3 also being in high demand. It continued to remain in top-ten charts in Japan and Europe the following month, and sold roughly 250,000 copies by August 18 in Japan. By the end of September, sales reached 1.37 million worldwide, and 2 million by the end of the year, similar to that of Luigi's Mansion: Dark Moon. As of 2023, the game has sold only 2.7 million units.

== See also ==
- List of Mario role-playing games
