= Mario & Luigi: Partners in Time =

2005 video game

- Developer: AlphaDream
- Publisher: Nintendo
- Director: Hiroyuki Kubota
- Producers: Shigeru Miyamoto; Tetsuo Mizuno
- Programmer: Masashi Haraki
- Artists: Masanori Sato; Akira Noguchi
- Writer: Hiroyuki Kubota
- Composer: Yoko Shimomura
- Series: Mario & Luigi
- Platform: Nintendo DS
- Release: NA: November 28, 2005; JP: December 29, 2005; EU: January 27, 2006; UK: February 10, 2006; AU: February 23, 2006
- Genre: Role-playing
- Mode: Single-player

Mario & Luigi: Partners in Time (Note: Known in Japan as Mario & Luigi RPG 2×2 (マリオ&ルイージRPG2×2, Mario ando Ruīji Aru Pī Jī Tsū bai Tsū)) is a 2005 role-playing video game developed by AlphaDream and published by Nintendo for the Nintendo DS. It is the second game in the Mario & Luigi series, following Mario & Luigi: Superstar Saga (2003). The story follows Mario, Luigi, Baby Mario, and Baby Luigi as they search for Princess Peach, who has been abducted by an alien species known as the Shroobs. Gameplay centers on cooperation between the quartet, who must use their specific qualities and skills to solve puzzles to progress. The game features multiple role-playing game elements and a turn-based battle system focused on timing accuracy.

Nintendo revealed Partners in Time at E3 2005. Key staff who worked on Superstar Saga returned, including producers Shigeru Miyamoto and Tetsuo Mizuno as well as composer Yoko Shimomura. The game narratively serves as a sequel to Superstar Saga, but the plot is unrelated to that of its predecessor, with more emphasis on the time-traveling theme, which involves the protagonists traveling in between the past and present of the Mushroom Kingdom.

Mario and Luigi: Partners in Time received generally favorable reviews. Critics praised its characterization and comical writing, as well as its use of the DS's dual screen and the rumble feature, although the use of the bottom screen in the overworld and battles received mixed opinions. The game was followed by Mario & Luigi: Bowser's Inside Story in 2009. Partners in Time was re-released for the Wii U's Virtual Console in 2015.

== Gameplay ==
A screenshot of Partners in Time. At the location Yoshi's Island, the Baby Mario Brothers are being controlled on the top screen, while the older ones are shown on the bottom.

The gameplay of Partners in Time, with an emphasis on role-playing game elements and co-operative puzzle-solving, is similar to that of its predecessor, although gameplay differences exist between the games. For the majority of Partners in Time, the overworld of the game is presented on the DS's touchscreen, while a map is present on the top screen, showing relevant information such as the location of each character and save albums. Additionally, the perspective changes when battling or accessing the inventory, and when the quartet is separated into two pairs, in which a pair is visible on each screen.

=== Overworld ===
The player is able to control the four main protagonists—Mario, Baby Mario, Luigi, and Baby Luigi—either as a quartet or alternatively in separate pairs. The player can choose to separate the adults from the babies, which is usually required when entrances or holes in the overworld are too small to be accessed by the adult characters. Such instances form multiple puzzles in the game, in which items or switches can be only be accessed by use of the babies' specific qualities. The pairs can also perform special moves while they are separated, which are gained as the player progresses through the game. Each action attained is assigned to a specific button on the DS for a character, which is present on the screen; pressing the corresponding button results in the action. These actions, such as the "Toadsworth Twist" (more commonly known as the "Spin Jump") that allows the older brothers to twirl through the air, are required to advance through the game and solve the various puzzles.

The game retains many of the RPG aspects present in its predecessor, including the interaction with non-player characters, which is required to advance the plot and gameplay. Each character's progress is measured by experience points, which are needed to "level up", a process by which battle-related statistical fields such as speed and power are boosted. As in Superstar Saga, there is a currency used to purchase items and status-enhancing equipment known as badges and clothes.

=== Battle ===
The battle system is similar to its predecessor's, with the effectiveness of an attack dependent on the timing accuracy of separate actions. The battles still consist of turn-based attacks executed by Mario and Luigi, although these are compounded by the babies' actions during an attack. The Bros. Attacks—moves performed by Mario and Luigi collectively—have been replaced by Bros. Items, which are finite attacks that are gained in the overworld. Similar to the Bros. Attacks, these are more damaging attacks that can be performed by all 4 characters collectively. Only the adults receive damage, even though the babies will become vulnerable once their respective partners have been eliminated from battle. The elimination of babies will also affect battle as some Bros. Items will become disabled, and the party will not be able to defend itself with hammers, which are wielded exclusively by the babies.

== Plot ==
Unlike Superstar Saga, Partners in Time is not set in the Beanbean Kingdom, but the traditional Mushroom Kingdom featured in most games of the Mario series. The setting features a mixture of locations, from those that appeared in previous Mario games, such as Bowser's Castle, to original locations such as Koopaseum. Mario and Luigi can travel into the past via "time holes", which is how the concept of baby characters is introduced. Much of this game takes place in the past Mushroom Kingdom, with only Peach's Castle being visited in the present Mushroom Kingdom.

=== Story ===
The game starts in the Mushroom Kingdom of the past, when Mario, Luigi, Peach, and Bowser were babies, and Toadsworth was much younger. The game then cuts to the present, when Professor E. Gadd completes a time machine that is powered by a gem called the Cobalt Star, which is presented at Peach's Castle. Peach enters the time machine into the past, but fails to return, only leaving a member of an alien species called the Shroobs within the damaged time machine. The Mushroom Kingdom of the past was conquered by the Shroobs, with Peach being kidnapped and held hostage at a Shroob-modified version of her castle called Shroob Castle. After defeating the monster, a time hole opens, leaving a passageway into the past. While searching for Peach, Mario and Luigi locate their younger selves, and team up to locate the Cobalt Star shards, which was shattered during Peach's journey. Mario's team collects all of the shards, while being pestered by Baby Bowser, who believes it is actually a valuable treasure. At the end, they restore the Cobalt Star only to unleash the Elder Princess Shroob, who was trapped inside the Cobalt Star by Peach and serves as the game's final boss. Mario and Luigi's team defeats the Elder Princess Shroob, but her spirit was inhaled by Bowser upon their return to the present. They defeat the possessed Bowser, and then Mario, Luigi and Peach say goodbye to their baby counterparts who are sent back to the past, now that the Shroob threat had been eliminated for good.

=== Characters ===
Partners in Time features both new and existing characters. Professor E. Gadd provides the player with advice throughout the game, while Toadsworth teaches the player new moves and skills to progress through the adventure. Although the older Peach is kidnapped, Baby Peach is retrieved from the past into the present by Toadsworth, where she is nurtured by both the old and young renditions of him. Baby Bowser appeared near the beginning of the game in the past to kidnap Baby Peach, although his plans were halted by an encounter with the Mario brothers and a subsequent attack from the Shroobs. Baby Bowser harasses the quartet frequently during their journey by stealing their Cobalt Star shards, and later attacking the group with his older self. Kamek the Magikoopa, Petey Piranha and Fawful, an antagonist from Mario & Luigi: Superstar Saga, appear in the game as well.

The Shroobs, introduced in Partners in Time, are fungal like creatures who are the main antagonists of the game. The name "Shroob" is a deliberate corruption of the word "shroom", short for "mushroom." The Shroobs derive from the "Shroob Planet" and are ruled by Princess Shroob, who is the main antagonist. After invading the Mushroom Kingdom, both she and her twin sister, Elder Princess Shroob, are defeated. Different species of Shroobs (with designs based on existing Mario franchise characters and enemies) are present throughout the game as both minor enemies and boss characters. AlphaDream also introduced Stuffwell, a talking briefcase created by E. Gadd who gives the player and brothers advice regarding items and accessories, which he stores.

== Development ==
Nintendo revealed Partners in Time at E3 2005, where a playable demonstration of the game was available. The demos consisted of three levels, each accompanied with a tutorial to guide the player. Each level had a different objective and represented the characters' abilities, such as the use of the hammer. Between the game's unveiling at E3 and its release, Nintendo of America revealed details relating to Partners in Time's plot and gameplay, as well as the fact that it would be compatible with the "Rumble Pak" feature. AlphaDream, developers of Superstar Saga, developed this game, with experienced contributors to the Mario series such as Koji Kondo and Charles Martinet working on sound support and voice acting, respectively. The music was composed by Yoko Shimomura, who also scored Superstar Saga. Partners in Time was first released in North America on November 28, 2005.

The game was re-released for the Wii U's Nintendo eShop as a Virtual Console title in 2015.

== Reception ==
Reception

Aggregate score
Aggregator	Score
Metacritic	86/100

Review scores
Publication	Score
Eurogamer	9/10
Famitsu	35/40
Game Informer	8.25/10
GameSpot	8.9/10
GamesRadar+	4.5/5
IGN	9/10
Nintendo Life	DS: 9/10; Wii U: 8/10
Nintendo World Report	8/10
X-Play	3/5

Partners in Time received "generally favorable reviews", according to review aggregator Metacritic. Reviewers lauded the game's use of characters and plot. IGN's Craig Harris commended the game's comic style, stating "much of the charm from Mario & Luigi comes from the focus on humor that's bizarre and out there". Despite this, GameSpot's Ricardo Torres stated that "The self-referential humor that gave the original game its bite isn't as prevalent". Nintendo World Report''s Jonathan Metts praised the game for returning to the traditional Mushroom Kingdom setting, claiming it led to more distinctive character and plot elements. While appreciating Partners in Time's use of humour, RPGamer's Derek Cavin criticised the game's plot, describing it as "a basic story that doesn't develop as much as it could have". The game's characterisation in particular was well received, with Eurogamer commending Stuffwell, who was compared to Fawful, a character in Superstar Saga.

Critics welcomed Partners in Time's use of the dual screen, as well as the Rumble Pak feature. GameSpot criticised the momentary use of the touchscreen, labeling it as "tacked on"; Eurogamer's John Walker, also critical of this, felt that the game was better without utilising the DS's touchscreen. Reviewers complained about the game's controls, expressing difficulty with coordinating the four characters, with problems arising specifically in enemy encounters with characters that were not being controlled. The alterations to the battle system received a mixed response. GameSpot praised the more complicated and "richer" boss fights, while Nintendo World Report criticised the added complexity, stating "the growth in enemy resilience outpaces your growth in strength, so battles get longer and longer". IGN noted that "Partners in Time's quest starts out a little too easy", although they acknowledged that the game became increasingly difficult as it progressed. X-Play criticised the game for the inclusion of Baby Mario and Luigi, and that the game did not utilize all of the Nintendo DS's software features.

Partners in Time's visuals and presentation were well received, with Eurogamer describing it as "utterly lovely". GameSpot appreciated the "added flair" in animation gained by the DS, although the perspective made such things as hitting blocks and countering attack "trickier than it should be". Torres proceeded to criticise the game's soundtrack, labeling it as the "weakest link", although other critics lauded the game's audio. On its first week of release in Japan, Partners in Time sold 132,726 units. Partners in Time sold 1.73 million copies worldwide as of 2020. In addition, the game has received the Editors' Choice Award from IGN. The game was ranked 50th in Official Nintendo Magazine's "100 Greatest Nintendo Games" feature. During the 9th Annual Interactive Achievement Awards, the Academy of Interactive Arts & Sciences nominated Partners in Time for "Handheld Game of the Year", which was ultimately awarded to Nintendogs.
