= Merlon (disambiguation) =

A merlon is a solid upright section of a battlement in medieval architecture or fortifications.

Merlon may also refer to:

- Merlon, a Paper Mario character
- Merlon Mountain, a mountain in British Columbia, Canada
- Merlon Yarde (born 1944), Barbadian cricketer
