= List of Paper Mario: The Thousand-Year Door characters =

Characters in Paper Mario: The Thousand-Year Door are flat like paper

Nintendo's role-playing video game Paper Mario: The Thousand-Year Door stars Mario, who is accompanied by several allies across eight chapters to prevent the antagonist, Sir Grodus, from collecting the Crystal Stars to open the Thousand-Year Door. Along the way, Mario allies with various characters, some of whom are based on existing species in the series. The character designs are flat, designed to resemble paper.

== Concept and creation ==
Like The Thousand-Year Door's predecessor game, Paper Mario, the characters and world in this game are flat and made of paper. At some point after the release of the sequel, Paper Mario: Sticker Star, a mandate was put in place that prevented the modification of certain Mario characters or creation of new characters in the Paper Mario games that "touch on the Mario universe". In the 2024 remake of The Thousand-Year Door, a modification of the Toad was added, causing belief that the mandate had been lifted.

== Main cast ==
=== Mario ===
Mario is the protagonist of The Thousand-Year Door, having visited the city of Rogueport after getting a letter from Princess Peach, who becomes kidnapped by the enemy organization, the X-Nauts. On his quest, he allies with multiple characters, including the Goomba Goombella, the Koopa Troopa Koops, a woman named Flurry, a Yoshi, a woman named Vivian, and a Bob-omb named Bobbery, using his and their abilities to make progress in collecting the seven Crystal Stars to prevent the game's antagonist, Sir Grodus, from using them to open the Thousand-Year Door and releasing a great evil. After collecting all seven Crystal Stars, the X-Nauts manage to use them to open the door, unleashing the Shadow Queen, who Peach was kidnapped to serve as a host for. Mario successfully defeats her in the end, saving Peach in the process.

=== Princess Peach ===
Princess Peach is the person who invites Mario to Rogueport via letter before being kidnapped by a group called the X-Nauts. While held captive, she works with an AI called TEC-XX that allows her to send information to help Mario against the X-Nauts in exchange for doing tasks for it, in which she is temporarily playable. Eventually, she discovers that TEC-XX has fallen in love with her. She is later used as the vessel for a being called the Shadow Queen, who the X-Nauts' leader, Sir Grodus, sought to awaken. She is rescued by Mario after he defeats the Shadow Queen.

=== Bowser ===
Bowser, normally serving as an antagonist to Mario, acts as a secondary antagonist who is spurred into pursuing the Crystal Shards and offended that Princess Peach was kidnapped by someone besides him. He is occasionally playable in sidescrolling platforming segments as he attempts to find Mario, occasionally attacking him, such as during a fighting tournament Mario participated in and during the encounter with Sir Grodus, being defeated in both fights. He is accompanied by his ally, Kammy Koopa, who assists him on his journey.

=== Partners ===
==== Goombella ====
Goombella is a Goomba archaeologist student and Mario's first partner, who joins him after being saved by him, as well as her archaeological interest in the Crystal Stars. She is able to provide an explanation for every character, enemy, and location in the game.

==== Koops ====
Koops is a Koopa Troopa who sets out on a quest to defeat the dragon Hooktail who ate his father, much to the chagrin of his girlfriend. He joins Mario after discovering that he was going to Hooktail's Castle, and after they defeat Hooktail and recover a Crystal Star, they also discover his father, having survived in Hooktail's stomach. Koops is able to launch himself in his shell at enemies and objects, the latter able to be grabbed for Mario.

==== Flurrie ====
Flurrie is an actress who assists Mario on his quest in order to help him access the Great Tree in Boggly Woods. She is a cloud spirit, capable of blowing hard enough to blow enemies and certain objects away.

==== Yoshi ====
Mario receives an egg in the third chapter of the game, which eventually hatches into a Yoshi that quickly joins his party. Depending on how long it took for the player to progress in chapter 3, he will have a different color. The player can also choose to name him. He participates in a fighting tournament at the Glitz Pit with Mario, naming himself The Great Gonzales Jr. after Mario's stage name. He is able to eat certain enemies and spit them out as projectiles.

==== Vivian ====
Vivian initially serves as a member of the villainous Shadow Sirens, facing abuse from her older sister Beldam. In the original English version, Vivian was insulted for being ugly; in the Japanese version, she was insulted for being a transgender woman. This was restored in English in the 2024 remake of The Thousand-Year Door. This abuse, combined with Mario helping her find a lost object, eventually convinces Vivian to become Mario's ally. She has the ability to hide in shadows and take others into there with her.

==== Admiral Bobbery ====
Admiral Bobbery is a Bob-omb sailor who, after his wife passed away from illness while he was at sea, refused to sail again due to blaming himself for being absent. He eventually agrees to navigate a ship after Mario delivers a letter she wrote before her death, encouraging him to not give up on sailing. Like other Bob-ombs, Bobbery is capable of exploding to damage opponents and destroy certain things like cracked walls, though unlike most other Bob-ombs, he does not die from doing so.

==== Ms. Mowz ====
Ms. Mowz is an optional playable character who runs a badge shop and acts as a thief otherwise. She is seen multiple times stealing treasure, giving a kiss to Mario each time they met. The player is able to add her to the party after finishing multiple optional quests. She is able to use her nose to discover treasure and steal items from enemies.

== Supporting characters ==
=== Professor Frankly ===
Professor Frankly is the former teacher of Goombella who helps her and Mario research the Thousand-Year Door and the Crystal Stars.

=== TEC-XX ===
TEC-XX is a computer owned by the antagonistic X-Naut group. It is first interacted with by Princess Peach after she is kidnapped by the X-Nauts, who it asks for help with various task in exchange for allowing her to send intel to help Mario against the X-Nauts. It is later revealed that it has fallen in love with Peach. Once the X-Nauts discovered this, they ordered it to shut down and wipe its memory, though it is later discovered to have survived.

=== Punio ===
Punio is a member of a race called Punis who seeks Mario's help in defeating the X-Nauts and saving other members of his species, including his sister Petuni, the elder Puni, and a skeptical Puni naed Puniper.

=== Don Pianta ===
Don Pianta is the leader of a mafia of Piantas that manage parts of Rogueport. He assists Mario after he helps his relationship with his daughter by helping him reach Glitzville.

=== Jolene ===
Jolene is a manager and announcer at the Glitz Pit who manages Mario after he joins the tournament there. In secret, she is the sister of the former champion, Prince Mush, who went missing, and sought to discover the truth.

=== Prince Mush ===
Prince Mush is the original champion of the Glitz Pit who later vanishes, later revealed to have had his life drained by a machine owned by the Glitz Pit's manager, Grubba. He is eventually revived by the power of one of the Crystal Stars and reunited with his older sister, Jolene. In the 2024 remake, Mush challenges Mario to an exhibition match in the ring, and will gift Mario his champion belt after defeating him as a show of respect.

=== Flavio ===
Flavio is a ship captain who agrees to help Mario sail across the sea. After being shipwrecked, he accompanies Mario as they seek a way to get off an island.

=== Pennington ===
Pennington is a penguin detective who works with Mario to discover various mysteries while on a train together, mistaking him for Mario's brother Luigi. He is among multiple passengers who is taken by a being called Smorg, whom Mario defeats.

=== General White ===
General White is a Bob-omb that creates a cannon at Fahr Outpost known as Big Bob. He first appears in Petalburg and during the seventh chapter of the game, he is traveling across the world before returning to Fahr Outpost. After Mario wakes him up from his sleep, he uses Big Bob to fire Mario to the moon.

=== Merlon, Merlee and Merluvlee ===
This trio belongs to a tribe of people with fortune telling abilities. Merlon is capable of upgrading Mario's partners, Merlee randomly provides random, temporary upgrades in battle, and Merluvlee can tell Mario where certain objects are and how to make progress.

=== Luigi ===
Luigi appears in Rogueport and tells Mario about a separate adventure he is on in-between the chapters of the game.

== Antagonists ==
=== X-Nauts ===
The X-Nauts are a group that is devoted to resurrecting an ancient demon called the Shadow Queen, seeking to collect the seven Crystal Stars and using them to open the Thousand-Year Door. They kidnap Princess Peach to use her as a vessel. The group is led by Sir Grodus, who often sends Lord Crump to deal with Mario and collect the Crystal Stars.

=== Shadow Sirens ===
The Shadow Sirens are a trio of sisters including Beldam, Marilyn, and Vivian who serve the X-Nauts with the intention of eventually resurrecting the Shadow Queen. While Marilyn does not speak, Beldam often berates Vivian, including using transphobic insults towards Vivian, a trans woman. The mistreatment combined with Mario helping her caused her to leave them and join Mario's group.

=== Hooktail ===
Hooktail is the first boss protecting a Crystal Star, being a large red dragon. Mario manages to defeat her and take the Crystal Star, saving Koops' father in the process, who was in her stomach. Hooktail has two older siblings: a brother who is a black and purple dragon named Gloomtail who resides beyond the Thousand-Year Door, and a sister who is a skeletal dragon named Bonetail, the latter who is an optional boss Mario can encounter in Rogueport's Pit of 100 Trials complex.

=== Rawk Hawk ===
Rawk Hawk is the current champion of a fighting tournament at the Glitz Pit, a large yellow bird man who speaks arrogantly and plays dirty in order to hold onto his position. He is later dethroned after being defeated by Mario, though becomes the champion again after Mario's name is accidentally removed.

=== Grubba ===
Grubba is the manager and announcer of the Glitz Pit. Although initially kind to Mario, he is later revealed to have been kidnapping fighters and stealing their energy for himself with a machine powered by a Crystal Star. Confronted by Mario, he uses his machine to power-up into a stronger alter-ego called Macho Grubba. Mario is able to defeat Grubba and claim the Crystal Star from it, reviving the fighter Prince Mush in the process.

=== Doopliss ===
Doopliss is a ghost-like entity who lives in Twilight Town's Creepy Steeple capable of taking on the appearance of others. When Mario arrives in Twilight Town, he uses the steeple's bell to turn the town's residents to pigs when it chimes. Mario eventually tries to defeat him but Doopliss takes the appearance of Mario whilst turning him into a shadow and unable to say his own name, causing Mario's partners to mistake Doopliss for Mario. Back in town, Doopliss challenges Mario to guess his name in return for Mario's body, but is unable to. With the help of Vivian, Mario is able to uncover Doopliss's name and defeat him back at Creepy Steeple, dropping his Crystal Star and prompting Mario's body to be returned. Fleeing the steeple, Doopliss later joins the Shadow Sirens following Vivian's departure.

=== Cortez ===
Cortez is an undead pirate skeleton who tries to scare Mario away from his treasure. When this fails, he does battle with Mario, and upon being defeated, becomes amenable to Mario after he reveals he only wanted the Crystal Stars he had, giving it to him. The Crystal Star is stolen by Lord Crump, and with Cortez's assistance, Mario is able to take it back.

=== Smorgs ===
A species of either black and magenta cloud-like creatures. A swarm of Smorgs were discovered by Mario in the basement of Riverside Station after they raised the station's drawbridge which blocked the route for the train, the Excess Express; Mario in-turn scared the swarm out. The following day, the swarm returned to hijack the Excess Express and kidnap its passengers as a hivemind named the Smorg Miasma.

=== Shadow Queen ===
The Shadow Queen is the final boss of the game located deep in the Palace of Shadow. She is responsible for creating the Crystal Stars. During the final battle, she possessed Peach and tries to engulf the world into darkness.

== Reception ==
The Escapist writer Jesse Lab regarded the main cast of The Thousand-Year Door as being among the most defining aspect of the game. This sentiment was shared by Hardcore Gamer writer Jacob Bukacek, who felt that the growth they experience as the game goes along is a valuable part of the game's enjoyment. Nintendo Life writers Ethan Gnau and Alana Hagues considered the characters in The Thousand-Year Door among the best in the Mario series, while Pocket Tactics writer Connor Christie attributed "much of the joy" in The Thousand-Year Door to its cast, calling some of its characters iconic. Logan Plant of IGN praised each partner's "well-defined design and personality", and stated that "almost every character does or says something hilarious that also serves the excellent worldbuilding", while GameSpot's Steven Petite called the cast "memorable" and "stellar".

Multiple writers for Eurogamer have discussed the characters of The Thousand-Year Door. Tom Bramwell attributed his interest in the game in part to its cast of characters as well as dialogue. He called them "warm and likable", stating that each character has their own "charm and personality", which motivated him to go around and talk to many of the characters. He also enjoyed the antagonists, saying that they were as "bumbling and incompetent" as would be needed for comic relief. Tom Phillips stated that the main cast of The Thousand-Year Door were fondly remembered, stating that each companion had unique designs, citing Vivian as an example of one of many characters with memorable arcs. While Christian Donlan considered the characters great, he also enjoyed Mario, stating that The Thousand-Year Door utilized the "plasticity" of the character better than any other game. He believed that Mario works well in the plot of The Thousand-Year Door, stating that he fits into settings like a fighting tournament, a murder mystery on a train, and a castle with a dragon because he doesn't have "too much baggage".

Following the news that Nintendo may be considering bringing unique Paper Mario character designs back, Nintendojo writer Robert Marrujo stated that half the fun of the Paper Mario games were "oddball" characters, citing characters like Goombella, Admiral Bobbery, and Don Pianta as examples. He expressed hope that a recent survey would result in more original characters like these. Polygon writer Joshua Rivera believed that the mandates held the series back in the areas it works best, stating that The Thousand-Year Door was "beloved" in part due to its "strange new characters and goofy variations on the usual assortment of Goombas, Bob-ombs, and Koopas".
