= Vivian (Paper Mario) =

Fictional Mario franchise character

- Paper Mario character
- Vivian, as she appears in Paper Mario: The Thousand-Year Door (2024)
- First appearance: Paper Mario: The Thousand-Year Door (2004)

Vivian (Japanese: ビビアン, Hepburn: Bibian) is a video game character appearing in the 2004 role-playing video game Paper Mario: The Thousand-Year Door. A purple ghost-like being who can manipulate fire and shadows, she is originally as part of the Shadow Sirens, a trio of antagonists hired to stop protagonist Mario from achieving his goals. However, she later turns into a heroic character, and joins Mario's party.

In the original Japanese version and some European translations, Vivian is transgender, with the game clearly establishing that she was born male but identifies as female; Vivian introduces the trio as the "Shadow Sisters", only to be berated by her eldest sister Beldam, whose intentional misgendering and repeated rejection of Vivian's chosen gender identity are a central part of her character arc. Later in the story, Vivian, disheartened by her sisters' constant abuse, befriends the more friendly and understanding Mario, not realizing who he is because his body has, at that point, been stolen from him; when the truth is revealed and she must pick a side, Vivian stands with Mario against her sisters and accompanies him for the rest of the game. All original English and German releases of The Thousand-Year Door removed mentions of Vivian's transgender status, with Beldam instead berating her for her appearance. All versions of the 2024 Nintendo Switch remake restore her transgender status, though Beldam no longer harshly misgenders her.

Vivian is a popular video game character, identified as a noteworthy example of LGBTQ characters in video games.

== Concept and creation ==
Vivian is a purple, ghost-like person with pink hair, white gloves, and a pink-and-white striped hat with the abilities to hide herself in shadows and manipulate flames. Her two older sisters, Beldam and Marilyn, wear blue and yellow hats respectively and vary in size.

In the original Japanese version, Vivian is a transgender woman who describes herself as one of "the three shadow sisters". She is subsequently scolded by Beldam, who misgenders her, calling her a man. This was carried over to the French and Spanish translations. When Paper Mario: The Thousand-Year Door was localized to English and German, Vivian's transgender status was not mentioned, and the transphobia from her sister was changed to insults about her appearance. In other localizations of the game, Vivian is still recognized as transgender. The Italian version, in particular, emphasizes her status as a trans woman by having Vivian express pride in having transitioned; she pushes back against her sister's bullying by saying "I'm proud to have turned into a woman!" In the Japanese version, Goombella is confused as to whether she is male or female. In all versions of the 2024 remake, she is presented as a transgender woman, while the script has also been updated to remove instances of characters misgendering her. Goombella's commentary on Vivian was changed, removing any discussion of Vivian's gender and replacing it with a discussion about how cute Vivian was.

== Appearances ==
Vivian first appears in the 2004 role-playing video game Paper Mario: The Thousand-Year Door. In the story of the game, she initially works as a member of the Shadow Sirens, which includes her two sisters Beldam and Marilyn, working against Mario and his allies. She assists Mario when he helps her find a missing object, unaware of his actual identity. When she discovers who he is, Vivian is initially reluctant to help him further, but decides to join him due to the abuse she suffered from Beldam and the kindness Mario showed her. She also comes to accept her identity as a woman. Vivian can aid Mario in battle, and has various abilities unique to her. She is able to use a technique called Veil, which protects her and Mario from damage. Other techniques she may use include Fiery Jinx and Infatuate. By the end of the story, Beldam vows to treat her better. She retains her role in the story in the game's 2024 remake.

Vivian appears in a cameo role in the sequel, Super Paper Mario, both as a collectible card and as a plush doll owned by a character. She also appears as a collectible in Super Smash Bros. Brawl and Super Smash Bros. Ultimate. The remake's confirmation of Vivian's trans identity prompted Joe Anderton of Digital Spy to speculate whether this indicated that she could appear in subsequent games.

== Critical reception ==
Vivian has received mostly positive reception since her appearance in Paper Mario: The Thousand-Year Door, becoming a popular character. Nintendojo writer Mel Turnquist included Vivian's decision to stay by Mario's side as one of their most inspiring moments in video games due in part to also being a younger sibling and relating to Vivian standing up to her family.

She has received particular attention for her status as a transgender character. IGN included Vivian at their favorite LGBTQ+ (lesbian, gay, bisexual, transgender, queer, and others) characters. They praised Vivian for not being defined by her status as a trans person, though expressed disappointment in the change from trans woman to cisgender woman in the English releases due to Vivian being one of few quality trans characters in video games. Drag queen Daphne J. Sumtimez included Vivian as one of her idols. In their essay on transgender characters, authors Emil Christenson and Danielle Unéus discuss Vivian and how her femininity is designed. They mention Vivian's bent wrists and frequent smiling as feminine qualities that she typically displays. They also bring up the pink color of her hat, noting that the contrast between her sisters may be intentional to heighten her femininity. They acknowledge the transphobia Vivian receives from her sister Beldam, but comment that it is depicted negatively due to her being a villain. Author Nicholas Taylor includes her in a section on transgender characters in the book Queerness in Play, discussing how Vivian's role in the narrative can help players understand their experiences with gender, identity, and expression. Nintendo Life writer Alana Hagues expressed a desire to see more characters like Vivian, noting how surprised she was that Nintendo made Vivian transgender in every version. She felt it was a huge step in the right direction for Nintendo, arguing they were otherwise spotty with respect to representation of LGBTQIA+ people. She discussed how relatable Vivian was due to her being bullied just for being who she was, noting that this was relatable to people in and out of the LGBTQIA+ community.

Automaton staff discussed how the term "otokonoko" was, at the time of the game's release, becoming more recognized, used to refer to both crossdressing men and trans women. They suggested that Vivian could be seen as the first otokonoko character in video games, despite also recognizing her as a trans woman. While discussing Beldam's transphobia, the author argued that while they could have removed the transphobia for political correctness, they prefer it to be there, arguing that depicting transphobia is not a bad thing if the work is itself tolerant. They also speculated whether Vivian's status as a trans woman would be retained, noting that the subject is sensitive and should be handled with care. They suggested that since the English and German versions of the original dropped her trans identity that the Japanese version could do the same, though they argued this would constitute a betrayal of Vivian fans. They were initially considering this possibility due to certain changes made to the Japanese version that matched changes in the English version, but were unsure if they would change Vivian to no longer be transgender due to a line of dialogue in Japanese where Beldam calls them the "Three Shadows," arguing that if Vivian was not transgender, there would be no need for Beldam to change it from "Three Shadow Sisters." They praised Vivian as a courageous character due to how difficult it is for people to come out about their identity, noting how her behavior, manner of speaking, and appearance show her as someone who works hard to be accepted as a woman. Inside Games writer Yabata also questioned whether Vivian's gender would change, noting that this question was a common one among fans of the game.

Some critics were displeased with how Vivian's gender was presented in the Japanese version of the original GameCube game, however. Writer Laura Kate Dale was critical of dialogue that stated she was at one time male, feeling it suggested she was not truly female. Vivian has been compared to Birdo, another transgender character in the Mario franchise, who is similarly misgendered in some games and had her trans identity removed in English localizations.

In 2025, Paper Mario: The Thousand-Year Door was nominated for the GLAAD Media Award for Outstanding Video Game at the 36th GLAAD Media Awards, which honored 2024 media with fair, accurate, and inclusive representations of the LGBTQ community. The honor was ultimately awarded to Dragon Age: The Veilguard.
