= Bug Fables: The Everlasting Sapling =

2019 video game

- Developer: Moonsprout Games
- Publisher: Dangen Entertainment
- Designer: Jose Fernando Gracia
- Programmer: Marcio Cleiton Jr.
- Writer: Jose Fernando Gracia
- Composer: Tristan Alric
- Engine: Unity
- Platforms: Windows; Nintendo Switch; PlayStation 4; Xbox One; Amazon Luna
- Release: Windows; November 21, 2019; Switch, PS4, Xbox One; May 28, 2020; Luna; July 1, 2021
- Genre: Role-playing
- Mode: Single-player

Bug Fables: The Everlasting Sapling is a 2019 role-playing video game developed by Moonsprout Games and published by Dangen Entertainment. Taking inspiration in art and gameplay from the first two Paper Mario games, the game's plot centers around three bugs (Vi, Kabbu, and Leif) as they search the mythical land of Bugaria in pursuit of the Everlasting Sapling, an item capable of eternal life. Along the way, they meet rival teams, past traumas, and other roadblocks hunting for the titular sapling.

The game was released on November 21, 2019, for Microsoft Windows, on May 28, 2020, for Nintendo Switch, PlayStation 4, and Xbox One, and on July 1, 2021, for Amazon Luna. It received positive reviews from critics, who praised its characters, combat system, presentation, and amount of content, but criticized its control issues.

== Gameplay ==
A screenshot showcasing combat in Bug Fables: The Everlasting Sapling. Protagonists Team Snakemouth (Leif, Kabbu, and Vi) fight enemies while facing to the left, with the former two wearing "Medals" to provide stat boosts and other bonuses.

The gameplay of Bug Fables is heavily inspired by that of Paper Mario (2000) and its sequel, The Thousand-Year Door (2004). There are three playable characters: Vi the bee, who can use her boomerang for multi-hit attacks, Kabbu the beetle, who uses his horn for single-hit attacks, and Leif the moth, who uses ice magic to freeze enemies. When exploring the overworld, these characters can use their unique abilities to traverse the environment, solve puzzles, and find secrets, with more abilities unlocking as the game progresses. Enemies are visible on the overworld and can be either engaged or avoided. Combat is played in a turn-based format which makes use of small minigames similar to Paper Mario, as the player must time button presses to maximize the efficacy of their moves, or to take less damage from enemy attacks. The party also shares Teamwork Points (TP), which are used for special attacks, as well as Medal Points (MP), which are used for equipable medals that can enhance certain attributes, grant resistance to status debuffs, or unlock special moves. Upon winning a battle, the party is awarded Exploration Points (EXP); earning enough EXP will increase the party's explorer rank, where the player can choose to increase their HP by 1 per member, or TP or MP by 3. At certain ranks, the party will learn new moves or gain boosts to their stats or inventory space.

== Plot ==
=== Setting ===
Bug Fables takes place in the land of Bugaria, entirely within the backyard of an abandoned house. It is home to numerous types of sentient insects, who were uplifted by a mysterious force following the disappearance of humans in an unspecified cataclysm. Other insects were unaffected by the force, and remained feral. Bugaria is separated into several kingdoms: Ants to the center, Bees to the West, Termites to the South, and Wasps to the North. The land also includes features such as a vast desert - actually an old sandbox - and a lake formed by a leaking pipe. Bugaria is a rare safe haven due to the effects of a magical crystal, and while other lands exist in the far north and east, they are at the mercy of unknown giant beasts.

The land is also home to strange relics and ruins left behind by the first group of insects to gain sentience: Roaches. One such legendary relic is the Everlasting Sapling, said to grant bugs eternal life. The Sapling was hidden by the Roaches, but it is known that a collection of artifacts can be used to unlock it. In the more recent past, Queen Elizant I arrived from a faraway land, established the Ant Kingdom, and searched for the Everlasting Sapling until being willingly placed in magical stasis. Following this, her daughter, Queen Elizant II, took over and established an Explorer's Association to fund expeditions to find these artifacts as a means of recovering the Sapling.

=== Characters ===
Bug Fables has three main playable characters, Vi, Kabbu and Leif. Vi is a young bee who is short and fiercely independent for her kind. She is outwardly greedy and immature, though she has a kind heart. While she claims she was exiled from her hive, in reality, she ran away from home after being accused of being a weakling by her sister. Kabbu is a chivalrous warrior beetle who journeyed from the far North. He has heavy survivor guilt due to being unable to save his companions from a monstrous feral bug during the journey there. Leif, whom the other two discover while exploring the cave of Snakemouth Den, is a moth explorer with a corpse-like appearance who had seemingly perished a century earlier, and can use powerful ice magic. He is stern, mature, and has an acerbic wit, displaying little emotion. Leif later discovers that he is actually an advanced form of cordyceps created by the Roaches as part of immortality experiments, who inherited the original Leif's memories, but finds meaning in carrying out Leif's legacy. A fourth playable character, a player-nameable baby carnivorous plant (named Chompy by default) can be unlocked to assist the team in battle, and blindly follows the team due to imprinting.

Queen Elizant II is a primary supporting character. While her motivations are initially suspect, her search for the Sapling is actually prompted by her insecurity as a ruler and desire to revive her mother. The game's true villain is the Wasp King, Hoaxe - a once-impoverished bug who chanced upon an ancient Roach crown with the ability to control Wasps and manipulate fire, and is willing to sacrifice anyone in his single-minded pursuit of the Sapling to grant himself infinite power.

=== Story ===
The game begins with the characters Kabbu and Vi arriving at the Association. They form an explorer team to achieve their common goal of exploring Snakemouth Den. Along the way, they meet a moth trapped in a spider's web, free him, and narrowly escape from the spider. The moth, Leif, learns of his newfound ability to use ice magic and knowledge of the Roach language, and joins the two as a fighter. At the end of Snakemouth Den, the team finds one of the ancient artifacts, but taking it triggers a trap that floods the room, and they are attacked by the spider once more.

After defeating the spider, the gang is washed out, but are pulled up near the Ant Kingdom. The trio is officially dubbed Team Snakemouth, and begins searching for the remaining artifacts, while seeking answers about Leif's past and magical abilities. They collect several artifacts, but the Wasp Kingdom becomes ever more belligerent, until they invade the Ant Kingdom seeking the relics. The usurping Wasp King is narrowly repelled, and Team Snakemouth goes on a covert mission to confront the king. This is revealed as misdirection, and the King invades the anthill a second time, capturing the relics for himself.

Elizant II reveals that she was looking for the Sapling to free her mother from eternal sleep and install her to the throne forever, believing herself an inferior ruler. She and Team Snakemouth travel to Termite City in order to beseech the aid of the more advanced species. Convinced by the team's combat skills, the Termites give them a submarine, allowing them to attack Rubber Prison, a facility that the Wasps captured as a staging area to enter the Giants' Den, the boarded-up house neighboring Bugaria. Team Snakemouth recaptures the prison, but it is too late to stop the Wasp King from entering the house. The Wasps' true queen gives the team a relic that can deflect the King's magical flames.

The team enters the lifeless Giants' Den, fighting off strange creatures called Dead Landers. They discover a surviving Roach tribe that has been guarding the Sapling, but was easily defeated by the Wasp King. Elizant changes her mind about the Sapling, and orders it to be destroyed. Team Snakemouth catches up with the King at the Sapling, but are unable to stop him from unlocking it. However, the Sapling is withered after being without sunlight for ages. After eating its last remaining fruit, the Wasp King becomes the Everlasting King, gaining massive power and burning the Sapling to the ground. After being defeated, he loses control and transforms into a normal tree. With the Sapling's power forever lost, some of the remaining Roaches reunite with the other bugs in Bugaria, and the team is knighted for their efforts.

== Development ==
Bug Fables was developed by Panama-based Moonsprout Games, made up of Panamanian writer and programmer Jose Fernando Gracia and Brazilian programmer Marcio Cleiton Jr. The two had initially met on a Pokémon Nuzlocke forum. The game started development in 2015 and was tentatively titled Paper Bugs until its final name was revealed in January 2018, alongside an IndieGoGo campaign. A playable demo was also released. Bug Fables' gameplay and aesthetics were inspired by the first two Paper Mario games, as the developers felt the later games strayed too far from those games' formula. Other role-playing games which influenced Bug Fables include Persona 5, Tales of Zestiria, Golden Sun, and Xenoblade Chronicles. The game was developed using Unity.

== Reception ==
Reception

Aggregate scores
Aggregator	Score
Metacritic	PC: 86/100; NS: 85/100; PS4: 79/100
OpenCritic	100% recommend

Review scores
Publication	Score
Nintendo Life	NS: 8/10
Nintendo World Report	NS: 9.5/10
RPGamer	4/5
TouchArcade	4.5/5

The Microsoft Windows, Nintendo Switch, and PlayStation 4 versions of Bug Fables all received "generally favorable" reviews from critics, according to the review aggregation website Metacritic. Fellow review aggregator OpenCritic assessed that the game received "mighty" approval, being recommended by 100% of critics. Praise was directed to the game's level design, combat, and writing, which were positively compared to the early Paper Mario games. Another highlight of the game according to critics is the art style which was both "pleasant and simple". However, some critics felt that it did falter in its platforming sections. In addition, certain puzzles were cited as quite hard to accomplish due to the "flat" artstyle, mostly with Vi's boomerang.
