= Jeremy O'Sullivan =

Australian skier and sighted guide

Personal information
- Full name: Jeremy O'Sullivan
- Nationality: Australia
- Born: 19 August 1989 (age 36)

Sport
- Country: Australia
- Sport: Para-alpine skiing
- Event: Giant slalom slalom
Medal record
Guide for men's para-alpine skiing

Jeremy O’Sullivan (born 19 August 1989) is an Australian skier and sighted guide for visually impaired skiers. He was Shaun Pianta's guide at the 2018 Winter Paralympics.

O'Sullivan was born and raised in Bright, Victoria.

O’Sullivan started competitive alpine skiing in 2000. He became the guide for Shaun Pianta in 2015. Prior to Pianta, O'Sullivan was guide to Jessica Gallagher and Prue Watt. At the 2016/17 World Para-alpine skiing Europa Cup event in Veysonnaz, Switzerland, in their first major international competition, Pianta and O'Sullivan posted career-best scores in the men's Super G and giant slalom.

At the 2018 Winter Paralympics, Pianta and O'Sullivan competed in two events - 14th in the men's giant slalom visually impaired and did not finish in the men's slalom visually impaired.
