= Pianta =

Pianta is an Italian surname. Notable people with the surname include:

- Alfredo Pianta (1901–?), Argentine weightlifter
- Carlo Pianta (born 1967), Brazilian musician
- Francesco Pianta (1634–1692), Italian sculptor
- Georges Pianta (1912–1997), French politician
- Pietro Pianta (1940–2015), Italian football goalkeeper
- Shaun Pianta (born 1989), Australian para-alpine skier

== See also ==
- Super Mario Sunshine#Plot
