= Goomba =

Super Mario character

- Mario race
- Promotional art by Shigehisa Nakaue (2022)
- First appearance: Super Mario Bros. (1985)
- Genre: Platform game

In-universe information
- Leader: Bowser

Goombas (/ˈɡuːmbə/), known in Japan as Kuribō, (Note: Japanese: クリボー, Hepburn: Kuribō; [kɯ.ɾi.boː]) and originally Little Goomba, are a fictional species and enemy from Nintendo's Mario franchise. They first appeared in the NES video game Super Mario Bros. as the first enemy players encounter, part of Bowser's army. There are multiple variants of Goombas, including Paragoombas and Cat Goombas, as well as offshoots like Galoombas and Goombrats. There have also been non-antagonistic Goombas in the Paper Mario and Mario & Luigi series. They have appeared outside video games, including in film and television.

Goombas are brown shiitake-like creatures with long black eyebrows, a sharp underbite, a tan stem, dark brown feet, no limbs, and are most commonly seen walking around aimlessly, often as an obstacle. They were included late in the development of Super Mario Bros. as a simple, easy-to-defeat enemy after playtesters found the Koopa Troopa enemy too difficult, creating a sprite and flipping it to convey walking.

The species is considered one of the most iconic elements of the Super Mario series, appearing in nearly every game in the series, and is often ranked amongst the most famous enemies in video games. In 2009, CraveOnline described it as the series' "everyman". The video game incarnation has been made into several plush toys.

== Concept and creation ==
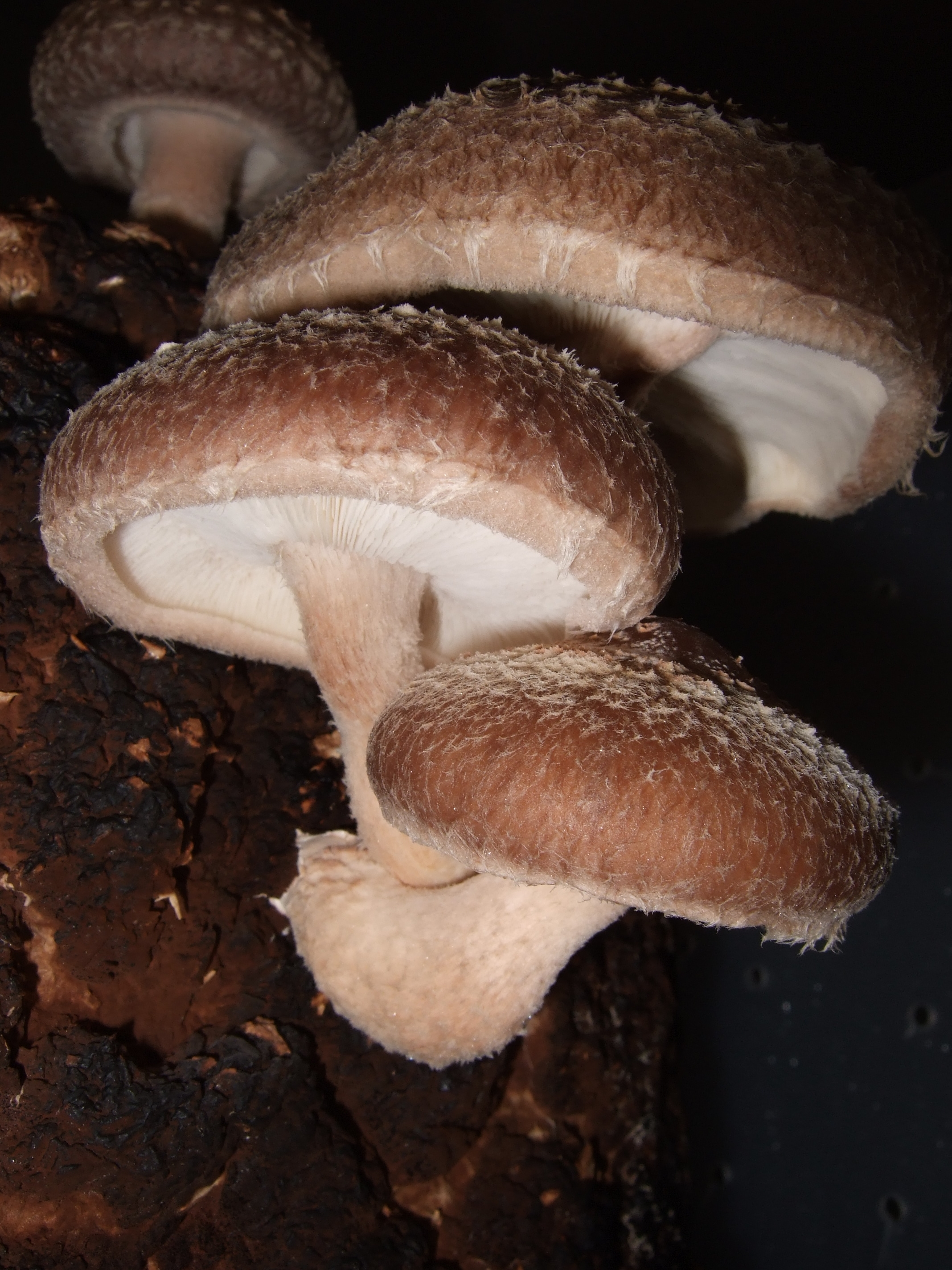
The Goomba is based on a shiitake.

Goombas are brown creatures designed to resemble shiitake, with bushy eyebrows and a pair of tusk-like teeth sprouting from their lower jaw. They have no arms and two feet. In their debut game, Super Mario Bros., they were the last enemy added after playtesters stated that the Koopa Troopa enemy was too difficult. The designers created it as a more basic enemy. Due to limited space remaining, the team created a single sprite that they flipped back and forth to convey walking. It bears a resemblance to the Super Mushroom power-up that Mario can use to strengthen himself, which forced designers to change the mechanics and appearance of the Super Mushroom. They used the Goomba's ability to be jumped on and defeated to teach players how to deal with enemies and to not fear the Super Mushroom.

Early concept art for the live-action Super Mario Bros. film showed that the design of the Goombas were originally intended to be for Koopa Troopas, another kind of Mario enemy. A separate company from the primary makeup departments designed the Goombas in the film.

=== Etymology ===
The name Goomba is derived from "Goombah" (from Neapolitan cumpà) which refers to an Italian American man. Also, in Hungarian, gomba means 'mushroom'. In Japanese, Goombas are called Kuribō, which loosely translates as 'chestnut person'.

== Appearances ==
A Goomba as seen in Super Mario Bros. Its late addition to the game resulted in its simple animation.

Goombas debuted in Super Mario Bros., and have reappeared in most games in the series. In the 2D games, they walk aimlessly in a straight line, turning only when meeting an obstacle. They can be defeated by jumping on them, which flattens them. In this game, Goombas can come in different colors depending on the setting, appearing as brown in overworld levels, blue in underground levels, and gray in castle levels. Goombas come in multiple variants as well, including ones bigger and smaller. Other variants include undead Goombas called Bone Goombas, Cat Goombas, and winged Goombas called Paragoombas. In Super Mario Sunshine, Goombas are not present; instead, a Goomba-like enemy called Strollin' Stu is introduced. In Super Mario Bros. 3, a variant can be found riding in an item called Goomba's Shoe, which Mario can ride in after defeating the Goomba. Multiple offshoots of the Goomba have also been created, including the Goombo in Super Mario Land, Galoomba in Super Mario World, Goombrat in New Super Mario Bros. U, and Goombud in Super Mario Maker 2. In Super Mario Odyssey, a female Goomba called Goombette was introduced, which will flee from the player unless they are in control of a Goomba. Goombas appear as bosses multiple times, including Goomboss in Paper Mario and Super Mario 64 DS and a large Goomba called Mega Goomba in New Super Mario Bros.

A stylized depicion of a Goomba's head is used as its primary mean of identification across the Mario franchise.

Multiple characters in the Goomba species have appeared in the Mario series. In the first Paper Mario video game, a village of non-hostile Goombas is introduced, and Mario partners with a playable Goomba called Goombario. This game also features a boss Goomba called Goomba King. The sequel introduces multiple other Goombas, including another playable Goomba named Goombella and her mentor, Professor Frankly. Both Goombario and Goombella are able to inform Mario about aspects of the world, non-playable characters, and enemies, including the latter's health and offense. In these games, as well as Super Mario RPG and the Mario & Luigi series, Goombas appear as both enemies and allies. In Mario & Luigi: Superstar Saga + Bowser's Minions side-mode Minion Quest: The Search for Bowser, a Goomba known as Captain Goomba stars as the main protagonist. In the story, he adventures through the Beanbean Kingdom with Captain Shy Guy, Captain Boo, and Captain Koopa Troopa to find Bowser, and freeing the Koopalings from Fawful's control; near the end of the story, Captain Goomba reaches Bowser's Castle, and has a final fight against Fawful. After his defeat, Captain Goomba reunites with Bowser, only for him, Bowser, and the other captains to the blasted out of the castle. Once they return to the Mushroom Kingdom, Bowser promotes Captain Goomba as captain of his minions, but realizes that he was responsible for his amnesia, and the story ends with Captain Goomba losing his rank as a captain. He returns in the sequel Bowser Jr.'s Journey. In Mario & Luigi: Brothership, Goombas returns as enemies, with their Glohm variants introduced.

Goomba appears as an enemy in multiple entries of the Super Smash Bros. series, including Super Smash Bros. Melee, Super Smash Bros. Brawl, and Super Smash Bros. for Nintendo 3DS. They are also a playable character in multiple spinoffs, including the Mario baseball games Mario Superstar Baseball and Mario Super Sluggers, Mario Party games Super Mario Party and Super Mario Party Jamboree, and Mario Kart World. In Dr. Mario World, a stack of Goombas called Dr. Goomba Tower was added as a playable character. Goombas also appear as enemies in The Legend of Zelda: Link's Awakening.

Goombas appear in the 1989 television cartoon series The Super Mario Bros. Super Show!, and The Adventures of Super Mario Bros. 3. In the Super Mario Bros. live-action film, Goombas were originally inhabitants of Dinohattan who opposed the tyrannical President Koopa's rule, and were transformed by devolving them as punishment turning them into large, reptilian monsters called Goombas. A specific Goomba appears as an ally to the protagonists Mario and Luigi. Goombas reappear as part of Bowser's minions in the 2023 film The Super Mario Bros. Movie.

Goombas have appeared in various pieces of merchandise. Nintendo has collaborated with McDonald's to make Mario-themed Happy Meal toys multiple times.

== Reception ==
The Goomba has become an icon of the Mario series, both in its appearance and the concept of "stomping on them", often referenced as one of the key elements of the original Super Mario Bros. IGN editor Craig Harris described the Goomba as a "household name" along with Koopa Paratroopas and King Koopa. Video game musician and reviewer Tommy Tallarico commented that many new converts to gaming have "never even made Super Mario smoosh a "Goomba". In a criticism of video game storytelling, Gamasutra editor Daniel Cook referenced Goombas being mushrooms, but also that it was a less important fact than them being squat, to-scale with the world, and able to be squashed. In an article discussing happiness in video games, Gamasutra editor Lorenzo Wang listed the sound the Goomba makes when it's squished as one of his pleasures. IGN editor Mark Birnhaum praised the sound effects of Super Mario Bros., giving similar praise to the sound of the Goomba being stomped on. It was compared to the Met enemy from the Mega Man series, calling them the "Goomba of the Mega Man series". In 2009, CraveOnline editor Joey Davidson described the Goomba as the series' "everyman", describing it as both defenseless and of little threat, listing such exceptions as the giant Goomba seen in Super Mario Galaxy. A common enemy in Braid has been compared to the Goomba, Gaming Age editor Dustin Chadwell calling it a "slightly skewed version of the Goomba". GameDaily listed Goomba as the fourth best Mario enemy, stating that every gamer has run into one as Mario before. Destructoid listed the deaths of Goombas as one of the six sinister things about Super Mario, saying that "whether or not the Goombas are actually working for Bowser, they certainly don't seem like killers, or even soldiers. They walk around aimlessly, and if you touch them, you get hurt. Is that worth killing over?" Nintendo Power listed them as one of their favorite punching bags, stating that while it's hard not to feel bad for them, it is still satisfying.

The live-action Super Mario Bros. film version of the Goomba has received negative reception. IGN editor Jesse Schedeen called Bowser and his Goombas the most screwed up part of the film, commenting that it would be difficult to create a live action version of the Goomba that deviates from the original version more than this. An Entertainment Weekly article called the design creepy, stating that its "foam-latex skin had to be baked for five hours at 200 degrees to achieve that lovely reptilian effect". The facial design of the character Venom in Spider-Man 3 was compared to the film versions of the Goomba by CraveOnline, describing Venom's face as stupid, short, and rounded. Hal Hinson of The Washington Post called the Goombas "big dumb goons with shrunken little dino heads", yet also calling them the "best movie heavies since the flying monkeys in 'The Wizard of Oz'".

== See also ==
- List of Mario franchise enemies
