= Super Paper Mario =

2007 video game

- North American and Australian artwork
- Developer: Intelligent Systems
- Publisher: Nintendo
- Director: Ryota Kawade
- Producers: Kensuke Tanabe; Ryoichi Kitanishi
- Programmer: Tadao Nakayama
- Artist: Chie Kawabe
- Composers: Naoko Mitome; Chika Sekigawa; Yasuhisa Baba
- Series: Paper Mario
- Platform: Wii
- Release: NA: April 9, 2007; JP: April 19, 2007; EU: September 14, 2007; AU: September 20, 2007
- Genres: Action role-playing, platform
- Mode: Single-player

Super Paper Mario (Note: Japanese: スーパーペーパーマリオ, Hepburn: Sūpā Pēpā Mario) is a 2007 action role-playing game developed by Intelligent Systems and published by Nintendo for the Wii. It is the third installment in the Paper Mario series following Paper Mario: The Thousand-Year Door (2004), and the first Mario game on the Wii. The game follows Mario, Peach, Bowser, and Luigi as they attempt to collect Pure Hearts and stop Count Bleck and his minions from destroying the universe.

Whereas preceding Paper Mario games are turn-based, Super Paper Mario has elements from RPGs and side-scrolling platformers; some critics described it as a hybrid of the two genres. The main feature is Mario's ability to "flip" between 2D and 3D perspectives. Most of the game is played in a 2D perspective, with the 3D perspective being used to solve puzzles and access previously unreachable areas. Peach, Bowser, and Luigi also have unique abilities, and additional abilities can be gained through acquiring partner characters known as "Pixls".

Super Paper Mario received generally positive reviews and was one of the best-reviewed Wii games of the year. Critics praised its gameplay, dimension-flipping mechanic, art style, originality, and story, although the large amount of text received some criticism. It was nominated for and won several awards, including the award for Outstanding Role Playing Game at the 12th Satellite Awards; critics have since regarded it as one of the best games on the Wii. More than 4.23 million copies have been sold as of 2014, making it the best-selling game in the Paper Mario series and one of the best-selling games on the Wii. Paper Mario: Sticker Star followed in 2012. In 2016, Super Paper Mario was re-released on the Wii U's eShop.

== Gameplay ==
The player, as Mario, can flip between 2D (top) and 3D (bottom), revealing secrets not visible in the other dimension.

Super Paper Mario is a platform game with action role-playing elements, differentiating itself from previous games in the series. Like its predecessors, the graphics consist of 3D environments and 2D characters which look as if they are made of paper. The player controls Mario and various other characters, overcoming linear platforms as in other Mario games. The player's goal is to collect the eight Pure Hearts and defeat the main antagonist Count Bleck. The player can talk to non-player characters (NPC), defeat enemies, or interact with the environment. Unlike previous Paper Mario games which used a turn-based battle system outside the overworld, in Super Paper Mario all combat is in real-time. Experience points are gained after defeating enemies and allow the player to level up to increase their stats. Mario can temporarily "flip" between dimensions, where the camera rotates 90 degrees to reveal a 3D perspective of the stage, revealing elements hidden in the regular 2D perspective, and can be used to maneuver around obstacles impassable in 2D.

Luigi, Princess Peach, and Bowser join the player's party as playable characters, each with unique abilities used to overcome specific obstacles. Luigi can jump the highest, Peach can hover and access inaccessible areas, and Bowser can breathe fire to defeat enemies; only Mario retains the ability to flip between 2D and 3D. The player can swap between any character in the party at any time using an in-game menu. Fairy-like creatures called "Pixls" are obtained that each bestow one additional ability, such as Thoreau, who allows the player to pick up and throw objects. Tippi, a Pixl who accompanies the player from the start, can reveal hints to defeating enemies and is used to find secrets in the environment.

The hub world is the town of Flipside, described as being located "between dimensions", and has a mirrored counterpart, Flopside, unlocked in the second half of the game. From Flipside and Flopside, the player can travel to different worlds via dimensional doors. Access to each world is initially locked; completing each world and retrieving the Pure Heart therein opens access to the next one.

== Plot ==
Super Paper Mario opens with Count Bleck abducting Bowser and Princess Peach and forcing the two to marry. Their union, as foretold by the Dark Prognosticus, summons the Chaos Heart. Bleck takes control of the Chaos Heart and uses it to open the Void, a slowly expanding inter-dimensional rift, in order to destroy the flawed universe and create a perfect one in its place. Mario is teleported to Flipside by Tippi and is tasked by Merlon to collect the eight Pure Hearts, which are necessary to undo the destruction. Mario, after learning the ability to flip between dimensions, starts his journey with Tippi at his side, traveling to the different worlds to collect them.

During the adventure, Mario reunites with Peach and Bowser, who join him in the quest. Bleck sends his minions, Dimentio, Mimi, and O'Chunks, as well as a brainwashed Luigi known as "Mr. L", to attack Mario's group and slow their progress. Luigi eventually recovers his memories and is the last to join Mario's group. Mario succeeds in collecting all eight Pure Hearts, but not before the Void grows large enough to obliterate one of the worlds.

In flashbacks, it is revealed that Count Bleck and Tippi were originally lovers Blumiere and Timpani. Blumiere's father, disapproving of their relationship, banished and cursed Timpani to wander between dimensions forever. Blumiere, in despair, took control of the Dark Prognosticus, determined to bring end to the universe. Unbeknownst to him, Merlon found and rescued Timpani by transforming her into a Pixl, wiping her memories in the process. The two slowly realize the other's identity over the course of the game.

With all eight Pure Hearts, the heroes travel to Castle Bleck. They encounter each of Bleck's minions but are lost one-by-one: Bowser and O'Chunks are seemingly crushed by a falling ceiling; Peach and Mimi fall into a pit; and Dimentio appears to kill both himself and Luigi. Mario and Tippi confront Bleck alone; Tippi reveals herself to be Timpani, but Bleck refuses to end his plan. The other heroes return and defeat Bleck by using up the power of the Pure Hearts. Bleck, returning to his Blumiere identity, urges the heroes to kill him to destroy the Chaos Heart and avert the apocalypse; however, it is seized by Dimentio, who seemingly kills Bleck's assistant Nastasia and brainwashes Luigi into serving as the host of the Chaos Heart. Blumiere and Tippi are teleported away, and the remaining heroes appear overmatched without the power of the Pure Hearts; however, the love between Blumiere, O'Chunks, and Mimi restores their power.

Dimentio is destroyed but leaves behind a shadow of his power to ensure the Chaos Heart can finish its task. Blumiere and Timpani marry, which banishes the Chaos Heart and reverses its destruction. The heroes, along with O'Chunks, Mimi, and a revived Nastasia, return to Flipside, but Blumiere and Timpani are missing; O'Chunks, Mimi, and Nastasia pledge to create the perfect world Blumiere promised to make.

== Development and release ==
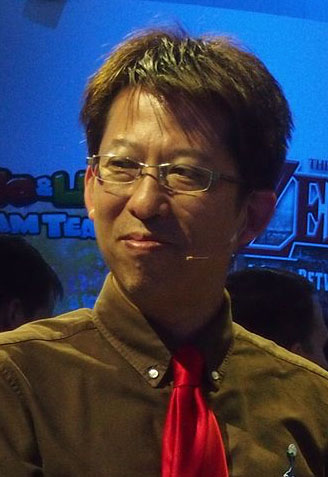
Super Paper Mario was the first Paper Mario game produced by Kensuke Tanabe.

Intelligent Systems developed the series' previous games and Super Paper Mario. Director Ryota Kawade changed the traditional concept of previous games with the intention of surprising fans with a new concept. While creating game concepts, he implemented switching through dimensions; he differed the combat from previous game entries to fit with the idea of dimension swapping. When presented to producer Kensuke Tanabe, they both agreed the game would work better in the style of an action-adventure video game, though he asked the staff to keep a role-playing game plot. Kawade found it difficult to "create a harmonic relationship between the worlds of 2D and 3D", and noted that the process consisted of trial and error. He said how creating one level "required the efforts of creating two levels", as they aimed for adding secrets in 3D that were not visible in 2D.

On May 11, 2006, Super Paper Mario was announced for the GameCube through a trailer at E3 2006, to be released in the fourth quarter of 2006. Nintendo opted not to have a GameCube on the show floor for a playable demo. GameSpot listed Super Paper Mario as a finalist for its E3 Editor's Choice. Nintendo confirmed a release date of October 9, 2006 later in May. Super Paper Mario was set to be one of the last first-party GameCube games, but development moved to the Wii in 2006. It was released in April 2007, becoming the first Mario game for Wii. The controls were kept similar to the GameCube version, and implementation of the Wii's motion controls were minimal.

Early PAL copies contain a bug if the language is set to English, German, or Spanish. According to Nintendo of Europe, if Mario speaks to the NPC Mimi in chapter 2–2 without first picking up a key, the game will freeze and force the player to restart from the previous save. Nintendo of Europe offered to replace any affected game discs with patched ones at no charge. The Korean version was the last to be published, releasing two years after Japan; it also contains unused development assets unique to its version.

== Reception ==
Reception

Aggregate score
Aggregator	Score
Metacritic	85/100

Review scores
Publication	Score
Electronic Gaming Monthly	B+
Eurogamer	8/10
Famitsu	9/10, 9/10, 9/10, 8/10
Game Informer	9.5/10
GameSpot	8.8/10
GameSpy	8/10
GamesRadar+	4/5
GameTrailers	8.7/10
IGN	8.9/10
Nintendo Life	9/10
Nintendo World Report	9/10
RPGamer	4.12/5

According to the review aggregator website Metacritic, Super Paper Mario received "generally favorable reviews" with a score of 85 out of 100, based on 57 critics; it has the sixth-highest score among Wii games released in 2007.

The dimension-flipping mechanic received generally positive reviews. Gamasutra described the game as a "landmark Wii release" and a "hit with critics". The dimension-flipping mechanic, puzzles, creativity, and writing received praise from critics, and most criticism was directed at its inability to please those looking for a pure RPG or platforming game. Its story also received praise, although some criticism was directed at the large amount of text. Game Informer reviewer Bryan Vore appreciated the inclusion of more platforming elements and the dimension flipping mechanic while praising the writing as "arguably the best" in any Mario RPG. Reviewers at Famitsu lauded its dimension-flipping mechanic, balance, and control scheme.

Matt Casamassina of IGN called Super Paper Mario a "must-buy" and complimented its blend of platforming and RPG styles, controls, and writing but was critical of the "ridiculous" amount of text and the "barren" appearance of the 3D segments. GameTrailers were also critical of the reliance on text but praised the story as well as the "robust" and "addictive" gameplay. Bryn Williams of GameSpy praised the "highly bizarre and amusing story line" as well as its level design and controls but said it was too easy and lacked in replay value. GamesRadar+ reviewer Brett Elston praised the graphics, dialogue, and controls but said that it started to "peter out close to the end".

Shane Bettenhausen of Electronic Gaming Monthly called Super Paper Mario a "must-play for any Wii owner" and praised its creativity, gameplay, puzzles, and script but criticized the "undercooked" RPG elements. Eurogamer reviewer John Walker also criticized the gameplay, calling it "slightly weaker" than most Mario platformers, but lauded its writing as "consistently hilarious, and toward the end, even impressively touching". Ricardo Torres of GameSpot said it was "not quite on par with some of the other entries in the series" but praised its gameplay, writing, length, and side quests. Michael Cole of Nintendo World Report criticized some "tedious puzzles" and backtracking, and praised the writing, visuals, and gameplay and called it a "peculiar, unexpected love-letter to Nintendo fans". Several reviewers at RPGamer praised the writing and comedic dialogue.

=== Sales ===
In its first week of release in Japan, 144,192 copies were sold, a similar total to previous Paper Mario games. It ranked as the best-selling game of the week. According to the NPD Group, 352,000 copies were sold in the United States in April 2007, ranking as the third-best selling console game of April 2007 in the United States behind Pokémon Diamond and Pokémon Pearl. By March 2008, Nintendo reported 2.28 million copies sold worldwide, with 500,000 copies sold in Japan and 1.78 million copies sold overseas. According to Kotaku, more than 4.23 million copies were sold worldwide, making it the best-selling entry in the Paper Mario series.

=== Awards and accolades ===
Super Paper Mario was nominated for Best RPG and Best Wii Game in GameSpot and IGN's Best of 2007 awards, winning the award for Best RPG from IGN. 1UP.com nominated it for Best Adventure Game and Game of the Year. It received six award nominations from Nintendo Power, including Wii Game of the Year and Game of the Year, and won the Reader's Choice award in the Best Story/Writing category. It is ranked as the second-best Wii game of the year in RPGamer's Editor's Choice awards, and three of RPGFan's nine editors ranked it among their top five RPGs of the year. CNET, IGN, Game Informer, GameSpot, and GamesRadar+ have since listed it as one of the best games for the Wii.

Award	Date of ceremony	Category	Result	Ref.
4th British Academy Games Awards	October 23, 2007	Innovation	Nominated	
Spike Video Game Awards 2007	December 9, 2007	Best Wii Game	Nominated	
12th Satellite Awards	December 16, 2007	Outstanding Role Playing Game	Won	
