= Merlon Mountain =

Mountain in British Columbia, Canada

- Location within British Columbia

Highest point
- Elevation: 2,925 m (9,596 ft)
- Prominence: 215 m (705 ft)
- Coordinates: 51°18′54.0″N 125°06′29.9″W

Geography
- Location: British Columbia, Canada
- District: Range 2 Coast Land District
- Parent range: Waddington Range
- Topo map: NTS 92N6 Mount Waddington

Merlon Mountain is a mountain in the Waddington Range of southwestern British Columbia, Canada.

== See also ==
- List of mountains of Canada
