= Paper Mario: The Thousand-Year Door =

2004 video game

- International packaging artwork, featuring various characters from the game, with Mario at center
- Developer: Intelligent Systems
- Publisher: Nintendo
- Director: Ryota Kawade
- Producers: Shigeru Miyamoto; Ryoichi Kitanishi
- Programmer: Tadao Nakayama
- Artist: Chie Kawabe
- Writers: Hironobu Suzuki; Misao Fukuda
- Composers: Yoshito Hirano; Yuka Tsujiyoko
- Series: Paper Mario
- Platform: GameCube
- Release: JP: July 22, 2004; NA: October 11, 2004; EU: November 12, 2004; AU: November 18, 2004
- Genre: Role-playing
- Mode: Single-player

Paper Mario: The Thousand-Year Door (Note: Originally released in Japan as Paper Mario RPG (ペーパーマリオRPG)) is a 2004 role-playing video game developed by Intelligent Systems and published by Nintendo for the GameCube. The Thousand-Year Door is the second game in the Paper Mario series following Paper Mario, and is part of the larger Mario franchise. In the game, when Mario and Princess Peach get involved in the search for a mystic treasure that holds great fortune, Peach is kidnapped by an alien group called the X-Nauts; Mario sets out to find the treasure and save the princess.

The Thousand-Year Door borrows many gameplay elements from its predecessor, such as a drawing-based art style, and a turn-based battle system emphasizing correctly timing moves. For most of the game, the player controls Mario, although Bowser and Princess Peach are playable at certain points between chapters. The game was announced at the 2003 Game Developers Conference, and was released late July 2004 in Japan and late 2004 worldwide.

The Thousand-Year Door was acclaimed at release and has since been cited as one of the greatest video games ever made. It won the "Console Role-Playing Game of the Year" award at the 8th Annual Interactive Achievement Awards, and is often considered the best game in the series. A remake was released for the Nintendo Switch in 2024. The game was followed by Super Paper Mario, which was released for the Wii in 2007.

== Gameplay ==
Mario folds into a paper airplane to glide across a large gap.

The Thousand-Year Door is a role-playing video game (RPG) with other nontraditional RPG elements. The player controls a two-dimensional version of Mario and explores a variety of worlds designed to look like paper. In these locales, he is tasked with retrieving seven Crystal Stars which involves Mario completing puzzles and defeating enemies to proceed.

In the overworld, the player can find items that can be used in and outside of combat. The effects of these items range from healing Mario or his partner to damaging the opponent. Mario can also purchase "badges" from non-player characters (NPCs), find them hidden in the environment, or occasionally obtain them from defeated enemies. Each badge requires a certain amount of Mario's badge points (BP) in order to be equipped. When equipped, these badges can permanently enhance a particular skill or aspect, or, in some cases, give Mario new abilities. Throughout the game, up to seven characters are permanently added to the player's party; one character is present alongside Mario at any given time and can be switched out at any point. Each character has a specialized skill, some of which are required to solve puzzles. These skills include activating switches and removing physical barriers. Mario is also "cursed" with abilities that allow him to fold into a boat or a paper airplane; these are performed when he stands on a special "activation panel". During the interlude between the game's chapters, the player controls Peach in the X-Naut Fortress and Bowser in multiple side-scrolling levels based on the original Super Mario Bros.

=== Combat ===
Mario and Goombella battle Hooktail, the game's first major boss. The audience spectating the battle reacts when the player successfully lands attacks.

Similar to its predecessor, combat in The Thousand-Year Door follows a turn-based battle system. When Mario comes into contact with an enemy in the overworld, the game transitions to a battle screen, taking place on a stage. Jumping or hammering an enemy before entering combat mode will cause a "First Strike." This allows Mario to damage the enemy before the regular combat starts. Likewise, some enemies can strike first and damage Mario before the regular combat starts. The player controls both Mario and his currently selected partner and chooses actions for each of them, which include attacking an enemy, using an item, or swapping the partner with another. Attacking and defending can be enhanced by executing timed button presses. For example, pressing the button when Mario jumps on an enemy causes him to jump on it a second time. Enemies have advantages based on their position on the stage or on their qualities. Some player attacks, such as Mario's hammer, can only target enemies on the ground, and spiky enemies will instead damage Mario if he jumps on them.

Each character has its own heart points (HP) that decreases each time it is attacked by an enemy. When a partner's HP is reduced to 0, the partner becomes inactive and cannot be used until revived. If Mario's HP is reduced to 0, however, the game ends and the player must start again from the last saved point. Stronger attacks require Flower Points (FP) to execute and are shared among Mario and his partners. Special attacks, which are unlocked each time the player acquires a Crystal Star, are more powerful and require varying amounts of Star Power to execute. If the player wins the battle, the player is awarded Star Points; for every 100 Star Points, the player levels up and chooses to increase Mario's maximum HP, FP, or BP.

Also during battle, a spectating audience reacts to how well the player performs. If the player performs well, the audience's cheers will replenish Star Power. If the player performs spectacularly, they may throw items to the player, such as a mushroom. Conversely, the audience may throw damage-causing objects at the player or leave if the player performs poorly in a battle. The audience starts with a maximum size of 50 and can grow up to 200 as the player levels up during the game.

== Plot ==
The Thousand-Year Door is set in the Mushroom Kingdom. The town of Rogueport serves as the hub world, connecting to all other locations in the game. The story is divided into eight chapters and a prologue, each of which primarily takes place in one of the unique areas. Each of the major locations are designed around a specific theme; Glitzville, for example, is a floating city known for its fighting arena. The enemies and town inhabitants in the game range from recurring Mario characters, like Boo, to characters exclusive to the game, such as the X-Nauts.

=== Characters ===
The Thousand-Year Door contains several characters, the majority of whom are not playable. Progression in the game is sometimes dependent on interaction with non-player characters, although many are used in the game's various minor sidequests. In particular, the Goomba Professor Frankly, who knows the most about the mysteries relating to Rogueport, must be visited every time Mario retrieves a Crystal Star. The game continues the tradition of Paper Mario, in which Mario can be accompanied by one assistant character at a set time. There are seven party members in total: Goombella the Goomba, Koops the Koopa, Madame Flurrie the wind spirit, a baby Yoshi who is named by the player, a shadow being named Vivian, Admiral Bobbery the Bob-omb, and the optional Ms. Mowz the Squeek. In the original Japanese and some European translations, Vivian is a transgender woman, while the script in the initial English and German releases were altered to remove any mention of her transgender status. Despite this, she is often cited as a popular LGBTQ+ video game character.

Mario is the main character of The Thousand-Year Door, although the story also rotates between portions where the player plays briefly as Princess Peach and Bowser. Most of Peach's story is spent on her interaction with the X-Nauts' computer AI TEC, who falls in love with Princess Peach despite not fully understanding the concept of love. Princess Peach agrees to teach TEC about love in exchange for the ability to contact Mario via e-mail. The series antagonist Bowser tries to collect the Crystal Stars before Mario does, instead of directly opposing Mario, though his attempts mostly become comedic relief.

=== Story ===
In the town of Rogueport, Peach purchases a magical treasure map which is rumoured to lead to the fabled fortunes behind the Thousand-Year Door in the town's ruins, which were built atop a seaside town that sank into the depths of the earth following a cataclysm. Mario receives the map and travels to Rogueport and soon becomes conflicted against the X-Nauts. Mario learns that the map could reveal the seven Crystal Stars required to unlock the Thousand-Year Door. In a hope to find Peach, Mario then goes to collect the Crystal Stars, acquiring new party members along the way.

Meanwhile, Peach is held captive at the X-Nauts' base on the Moon. Learning of the X-Nauts' leader Grodus' intents to obtain the map, Peach informs Mario of her findings, but is eventually caught. Across Rogueport, Bowser follows Mario's trail to obtain the Crystal Stars and take over the world. Mario successfully collects the Crystal Stars and reaches the X-Nauts' base, only to learn that Peach has been transported behind the Thousand-Year Door. Mario uses the Crystal Stars and opens the Thousand-Year Door. In the ensuing confrontation, Grodus reveals his plan to use Peach as a vessel for the Shadow Queen, the supposed treasure which is actually a demon who was sealed one-thousand years ago and was the one who caused the cataclysm. Though Grodus is defeated, the Shadow Queen successfully resurrects with Peach's body. With the help of the Crystal Stars, Mario defeats the Shadow Queen, preventing her dark magic from engulfing the world.

After a heartfelt farewell, Mario and Peach return home. Days later, Toadsworth informs Mario that Peach has found another treasure map and invites him to Rogueport once again.

== Development and release ==
Nintendo revealed The Thousand-Year Door at the Game Developers Conference of 2003. Before its release, the game was confirmed to be a direct sequel to the Nintendo 64 game Paper Mario and was known tentatively as Mario Story 2 in Japan and Paper Mario 2 in North America. A preview of the game was available at E3 2004; it included Hooktail Castle and a Bowser bonus level as playable stages. The game was released on July 22, 2004, in Japan, October 11 in North America, November 12 in Europe, and November 18 in Australia.

== Reception ==
Reception

Aggregate scores
Aggregator	Score	
Aggregator	GameCube	NS
GameRankings	88%	N/A
Metacritic	87/100	88/100
OpenCritic	N/A	97% recommend

Review scores
Publication	Score	
Publication	GameCube	NS
1Up.com	A−	N/A
Electronic Gaming Monthly	9/10	8/10
Eurogamer	9/10	N/A
Game Informer	6.75/10	8.3/10
GameSpot	9.2/10	9/10
IGN	9.1/10	9/10
Nintendo Life	8/10	9/10
Nintendo Power	4.5/5, 4.5/5, 4.5/5, 4.5/5, 5/5	N/A
Nintendo World Report	8/10; 9.5/10 (Japanese version)	N/A

Paper Mario: The Thousand-Year Door was well-received, with review aggregator websites Metacritic and GameRankings both giving the game an 87/100. Critics particularly praised the plot: GameSpot's Greg Kasavin stated that "each [chapter] provides a thrill of discovery", while Eurogamer's Tom Bramwell welcomed the whimsical storyline in comparison to traditional role-playing games, commenting that "[it is] something closer to Finding Nemo than Final Fantasy, which is very much a compliment." The game's characters were also well received, with reviewers complimenting the use of NPCs and text. Some commentators said that the story developed slowly in the game's beginning stages. Eurogamer rated the large amount of text as "the only major stumbling block" of the game.

One of The Thousand-Year Door's main features, the use of a paper-based gameplay mechanic, was welcomed by reviewers. When referring to the paper theme, 1UP commented that "It's a cohesive, clever approach that turns the game's visual style into more than just a look." Critics also commented extensively on the game's battle system, which deviated from traditional RPGs. GameSpy praised the use of timing in the battle system, stating that "these twitch elements were designed to be fun and engaging, and they succeed wonderfully at this." Reviewers also praised the concept of having an audience to reward or berate Mario during battle.

The game's visuals received a mixed response from critics. GameSpot enjoyed the game's presentation, writing that "it exhibits a level of visual artistry and technical prowess matched or exceeded by few other GameCube games." Conversely, other reviewers complained that the graphics were not much of a visual upgrade from its predecessor, Paper Mario. For the game's use of audio, IGN declared it "game music at its purest", but proceeded to question the absence of voice acting in the text based game. RPGamer commented that the music "for the most part is done very well", but that the perceived repetitive battle music was "one of the biggest flaws" of the game. The game won "Console Role-Playing Game of the Year" at the 8th Annual Interactive Achievement Awards (now known as the D.I.C.E. Awards), and was nominated for GameSpot's 2004 "Best Story", "Best Graphics, Artistic" and "Funniest Game" awards. The game was ranked 56th in Official Nintendo Magazine's "100 Greatest Nintendo Games" feature. Edge placed the game 93rd on their 100 best video games in 2007. In 2023, Time Extension included the game on their "Best JRPGs of All Time" list. In 2023, GameSpot writer Brandon Hesse rated the game as the best Mario RPG of all time, describing it as the "pinnacle of the Paper Mario series" and "one of the best RPGs ever made".

In its first week of release in Japan, The Thousand-Year Door was the best-selling game, selling about 159,000 units. It proceeded to sell 409,000 units in the country and 1.23 million copies in North America. The game has since been included in the Player's Choice line. As of December 2007, the GameCube game had sold 1.91 million copies worldwide.

=== Legacy ===
The Thousand-Year Door is considered by many to be the best game in the Paper Mario series. Later games to appear in the series, starting in 2007 with Super Paper Mario, began to change the format and genre after each release to fit the scope of an action-adventure series, by removing certain role-playing game elements and other features, such as turn-based combat. The new approach was often critiqued by critics, and most reviewers compare the game to The Thousand-Year Door to highlight what the games were lacking. Paper Mario: The Origami King returned some minor elements that had been removed from the games that it followed, such as Paper Mario: Sticker Star, but most critics still derided the game for missing classic features.

== Remake ==
Paper Mario: The Thousand-Year Door
- Developer: Intelligent Systems
- Publisher: Nintendo
- Director: Masahiko Nagaya
- Producers: Atsushi Ikuno; Taku Sugioka; Risa Tabata; Shinya Saito
- Designers: Yukio Morimoto; Shingo Igata
- Programmer: Yu Yamanaka
- Artists: Isamu Kamikokuryo; Kazuhito Norimoto
- Writer: Taro Kudo
- Composers: Yoshito Sekigawa; Kazuki Komai; Fumihiro Isobe
- Series: Paper Mario
- Platform: Nintendo Switch
- Release: May 23, 2024
- Genre: Role-playing
- Mode: Single-player

A remake of Paper Mario: The Thousand-Year Door for the Nintendo Switch was announced during a Nintendo Direct presentation on September 14, 2023. The remake features redone graphics, animations and music, along with quality of life changes and some new features exclusive to the Switch version. These include an updated fast travel system, increased item and coin capacity, the ability to toggle the original GameCube soundtrack using a badge, a gallery for viewing art and music, and two new secret bosses. Intelligent Systems returned to develop the remake, with Tose assisting on development. Marza Animation Planet also provided assistance with in-game lighting.

Alterations were made to the game's English script, including some removals such as a scene where Goombella is catcalled by villainous Goombas and defends herself against it, and some restorations to match the original Japanese script, such as restoring Vivian's portrayal as a transgender character. It was released on May 23, 2024. Nintendo Life reported that the game runs at 30 frames per second as opposed to the original's 60, but noted that it did not majorly affect their gameplay experience.

=== Reception ===
The remake was equally well received upon release, with an average score of 88/100 on Metacritic, based on 106 critic reviews, giving the game a "generally favorable" review score. According to OpenCritic, 97% of critics recommended the game. While minor criticism was directed towards the game's lower frame rate and lack of substantial additional content, praise was directed toward the improved visuals and quality-of-life improvements made to reduce backtracking, which was a common criticism of the original. Many critics directed praise that had already been given to the GameCube original, including the story, battle system, locations, and cast of characters. By June 2024, the remake sold 1.76 million copies worldwide, nearly matching the original version's lifetime sales in a single month. As of March 31, 2025, the game has sold 2.1 million copies.

== Lawsuit ==
In 2008, Morgan Creek Productions filed a lawsuit against Nintendo alleging that they illegally used the song "You're So Cool" from the film True Romance in an advertisement for the game. Morgan Creek dropped the case six days later, after Nintendo revealed that the advertising agency, Leo Burnett USA, Inc., had licensing for the song.
