= Satellite Award for Outstanding Role Playing Game =

International Press Academy award

The Satellite Award for Outstanding Role Playing Game is an annual award given by the International Press Academy as one of its Satellite Awards.

== Winners and nominees ==
| Year | Winners and nominees | Developer | Publisher |
|---|---|---|---|
| 2006 | The Elder Scrolls IV: Oblivion | Bethesda | 2K Games, Bethesda, Ubisoft |
| 2006 | Final Fantasy XII | Square Enix | Square Enix |
| 2006 | Kingdom Hearts II | Square Enix | Square Enix, Disney Interactive Studios |
| 2006 | Marvel: Ultimate Alliance | Raven Software, Vicarious Visions, Beenox, Barking Lizards Technologies | Activision, Vivendi Games |
| 2006 | Neverwinter Nights 2 | Obsidian Entertainment | Atari |
| 2007 | Super Paper Mario | Intelligent Systems, Nintendo SPD | Nintendo |
| 2007 | The Lord of the Rings Online: Shadows of Angmar | Turbine, Inc. | Turbine, Inc., Midway Games |
| 2007 | Persona 3 | Atlus | Atlus, Koei, THQ, Ghostlight |
| 2007 | The Witcher | CD Projekt Red | Atari |
| 2007 | World of Warcraft: The Burning Crusade | Blizzard Entertainment | Blizzard Entertainment |
| 2011 | The Elder Scrolls V: Skyrim | Bethesda | Bethesda |
| 2011 | Bastion | Supergiant Games | Warner Bros. Interactive Entertainment |
| 2011 | Dark Souls | FromSoftware | Bandai Namco Entertainment |
| 2011 | Total War: Shogun 2 | Creative Assembly, Feral Interactive | Sega, Feral Interactive |
| 2012 | Mass Effect 3 | BioWare | Electronic Arts |
| 2012 | Dark Souls: Prepare to Die Edition | FromSoftware | Bandai Namco Entertainment |
| 2012 | Diablo III | Blizzard Entertainment | Blizzard Entertainment |
| 2012 | The Elder Scrolls V: Dawnguard | Bethesda | Bethesda |
| 2012 | Kingdoms of Amalur: Reckoning | 38 Studios, Big Huge Games | Electronic Arts |
| 2013 | Ni No Kuni: Wrath of the White Witch | Level-5 | Bandai Namco Entertainment |
| 2013 | The Elder Scrolls V: Skyrim | Bethesda | Bethesda |
| 2013 | Final Fantasy XIV: A Realm Reborn | Square Enix | Square Enix |
| 2013 | Sacred 3 | Keen Games | Deep Silver, Square Enix |
| 2013 | Tales of Xillia | Namco Tales Studio | Bandai Namco Entertainment |
