= Shaun Pianta =

Australian para-alpine skier

Personal information
- Nickname: Blinky
- Nationality: Australia
- Born: 24 February 1989 (age 37)

Sport
- Country: Australia
- Sport: Para-alpine skiing
- Disability class: B2
- Event(s): Giant Slalom; Slalom

Shaun Pianta (born 24 February 1989) is a B2 classified visually impaired Para-alpine skier from Australia. His guide in 2018 is Jeremy O'Sullivan. He represented Australia at the 2018 Winter Paralympics.

== Personal ==
Pianta was born in Collie, Western Australia on 24 February 1989. In 2008, whilst holidaying in Bali, he contracted a superbug virus that attacked his optic nerve. He was flown back to Perth, Western Australia and while in hospital experienced kidney failure. The virus left him with only 15 per cent of his vision. He is a qualified boiler maker and welder and has a Certificate in Business.

== Skiing ==
Prior to his loss of vision, he was an avid snowboarder. He took up Para-alpine skiing in 2012 after a Disabled Wintersport Australia expo in Melbourne. In December 2014, he broke both legs in a training run and spent three months in a wheelchair. At the 2017 World Para-alpine Skiing Europa Cup event in Veysonnaz, Switzerland, Pianta and his guide Jeremy O'Sullivan won silver medals in the men's vision impaired super-G and giant slalom. He competed in the men's slalom and giant slalom at the 2017 IPC Alpine Skiing World Championships but failed to finish in both events.

On 17 January 2018, he suffered a slight anterior cruciate ligament tear. Deciding against surgery, he undertook an intensive and highly structured rehabilitation process, including three weeks based at the Australian Institute of Sport.

On 6 March 2018, Pianta and sighted guide Jeremy O'Sullivan were selected in the Australian team to compete at the 2018 Winter Paralympics but he will be required to pass a final fitness test on his injured right knee ahead of his Paralympic debut on March 14. At the 2018 Winter Paralympics, Pianta competed in two events - 14th in the Men's Giant Slalom Visually Impaired and did not finish in the Men's Slalom Visually Impaired.
