= Paper Mario (video game) =

2000 video game

- North American cover art
- Developer: Intelligent Systems
- Publisher: Nintendo
- Directors: Ryota Kawade; Toshitaka Muramatsu; Takahiro Ogi; Hironobu Suzuki
- Producers: Shigeru Miyamoto; Kenji Miki
- Programmers: Kenji Nakajima; Kaoru Kita
- Artist: Naohiko Aoyama
- Writers: Kumiko Takeda; Kaori Aoki
- Composer: Yuka Tsujiyoko
- Series: Paper Mario
- Platforms: Nintendo 64, iQue Player
- Release: Nintendo 64: JP: August 11, 2000; NA: February 5, 2001; PAL: October 5, 2001; iQue Player: CHN: June 8, 2004
- Genre: Role-playing
- Mode: Single-player

Paper Mario (Note: Known in Japan as Mario Story (Japanese: マリオストーリー, Hepburn: Mario Sutōrī). Often called Paper Mario 64 to distinguish it from the series.) is a 2000 role-playing video game developed by Intelligent Systems and published by Nintendo for the Nintendo 64 home video game console. Paper Mario is the first game in the Paper Mario series. First released in Japan in 2000 and then internationally in 2001, Paper Mario was later re-released for Nintendo's Wii Virtual Console in July 2007, the Wii U Virtual Console in April 2015, and the Nintendo Classics service on December 10, 2021.

Paper Mario is set in the Mushroom Kingdom as the protagonist Mario tries to rescue Princess Peach from Bowser, who has imprisoned the seven "Star Spirits", lifted her castle into the sky and has defeated Mario after stealing the Star Rod from Star Haven and making himself invincible. To save the Mushroom Kingdom, rescue Peach, get the castle back, and defeat Bowser, Mario must locate the Star Spirits, who can negate the effects of the stolen Star Rod, by defeating Bowser's minions guarding the star spirits. The player controls Mario and a number of partners to solve puzzles in the game's overworld and defeat enemies in a turn-based battle system. The battles are unique in that the player can influence the effectiveness of attacks by performing required controller inputs known as "action commands".

Although Nintendo planned to have Square, now Square Enix, develop Paper Mario, the company was occupied with developing Final Fantasy VII for the PlayStation; Intelligent Systems developed the game instead. The game received acclaim, being praised for its concept, battle system, and graphics, and was rated the 63rd best game made on a Nintendo system in Nintendo Power's "Top 200 Games" list in 2006. It was followed by a line of sequels, starting with Paper Mario: The Thousand-Year Door for the GameCube in 2004.

== Gameplay ==
Mario and one of his partners, Parakarry, walking through Toad Town. The game's visuals feature two-dimensional character cut-out designs contained within three-dimensional backgrounds.

Paper Mario combines traditional role-playing game (RPG) elements with concepts and features from the Mario series. For the majority of the game, the player controls Mario, who can jump and use his hammer to overcome physical obstacles placed in the game's overworld. Many of the game's puzzles and boundaries are based upon the abilities of Mario's partners, who each have a specialized skill required for progression in the game. The player accumulates partners as they advance into different locations; only one partner can accompany Mario in the overworld, although the player can interchange them at any time.

These characters also assist Mario in the game's turn-based battles, where the damage inflicted against them results in temporary paralysis as the characters do not have individual HP statistics. Attacks in the game are similar to those in traditional RPGs, although the player can influence the power of a move when attacking or defending by timing a button-press accurately or performing some other action command as required. Mario and his partners have a finite capacity to perform special moves, with each of these consuming a particular number of flower points (FP) when performed. Such statistics can be increased by earning Star Points (experience points) in combat to level up. There is also an on-screen gauge to display Star Energy, which is required to perform another type of move that accumulates in number as the player advances through the game. The player can locate hidden battle upgrades in the game's overworld, which promotes one partner character to a new rank at a time.

Progression through Paper Mario depends upon interaction with the game's non-player characters (NPCs), who often offer clues or detail the next event in the storyline. As in other RPGs, the player can find or purchase items from NPCs to help in and outside of combat. Badges can also be obtained that yield bonuses ranging from added moves to gradual health restoration during combat; each consumes a set number of Badge Points (BP), meaning Mario can only equip a limited number of badges at a time. Princess Peach is playable at particular points in the game as a recurring quest line. The objectives and actions of each transition to Peach vary, although most are stealth-based.

== Plot and setting ==
Set in the Mushroom Kingdom, the game begins when Mario and Luigi receive an invitation from Peach for a party at the castle. There, when Mario and Peach are alone, Bowser lifts her castle, overpowers Mario with his invincibility that he gained by stealing the Star Rod and imprisoning the seven Star Spirits; Mario is thrown away from the castle in the sky and lands in Goomba Village, where he is aided by Goombario and his family. Mario and Goombario make their way to Shooting Star Summit, where the weakened seven Star Spirits' request Mario to find them in order to stop Bowser's invincibility. Mario and his friends go to the four Koopa Bros.' fortress where they save the first Star Spirit, Eldstar; and they find the second one (Mamar) in the Dry, Dry Desert inside a secret fortress ruled over by Tutankoopa. The third one (Skolar) is being kept by Tubba Blubba, a nemesis scaring the Boos and eating them when he is "invincible" (his heart is his true weak point). The fourth one (Muskular) is kept by the General Guy and his minions living in the Toy Box. Mario and his new friends travel to Lavalava Island, an island where its inhabitants are threatened by an impending volcanic eruption. After saving the fifth Spirit (Misstar), they journey to Flower Fields retrieving the sixth one, Klevar. Mario becomes a suspect of murder when he finds the Shiver City's mayor unconscious; after solving the mystery (which was the mayor's own accident), Mario gets to the Crystal Palace where he saves the last Star Spirit (Kalmar) from the Crystal King. As he has saved every Star Spirit, Mario then departs to Peach's Castle.

Meanwhile, Peach tries in numerous attempts to escape the castle alongside Twink. The player controls Peach in a variety of minigames each time Mario saves a Star Spirit, such as baking a cake for Gourmet Guy or even cloning the appearance of Bowser's minions with a magic umbrella. At the end of every gameplay segment with Peach, she overhears Bowser speaking about the bosses Mario beats before being discovered and then transported to her room again.

Mario enters the castle and confronts Bowser; with the power of the seven Star Spirits, Mario manages to beat Bowser by stopping his invincibility while Twink, with support from Peach, battles Bowser's sidekick Kammy Koopa. Mario and Peach, alongside their friends, eventually win against Bowser and Kammy. The Star Spirits restore the castle to its spot. On another day, Mario and Luigi receives a letter for another party, which lead to a parade as the game's credits rolls, and Mario and Peach watch fireworks together at his home.

=== Story and characters ===
The game's story centers on Mario as he tries to reclaim the seven Star Spirits, who have been sealed in playing cards by Bowser and his assistant, Kammy Koopa. Their combined power is required to negate the effects of the Star Rod, which makes Bowser invincible. Once Mario rescues all of them, he uses their assistance to defeat Bowser and rescue Peach. The story is presented in the context of a novel, with each adventure involving the rescue of a Star Spirit denoted as a single chapter. Peach is playable between chapters, where she allies with a star kid named Twink in the castle to relay vital information to Mario regarding his quest.

Mario allies with eight partners in total, each of whom represents a different type of enemy from the Mario franchise. These allies are:

- Goombario, a Goomba who has the ability to tell the player about any character, environment, and enemy;
- Kooper, a Koopa Troopa with the ability to throw his shell at otherwise unreachable objects;
- Bombette, a Bob-omb with the ability to blow up weak parts of walls;
- Parakarry, a Paratroopa with the ability to help Mario cross gaps too large to jump across;
- Lady Bow, a Boo with the ability to make Mario become invisible and transparent;
- Watt, a Li'l Sparky with the ability to light up rooms and reveal hidden objects;
- Sushie, a Cheep Cheep with the ability to allow Mario to swim;
- and Lakilester, a Lakitu with the ability to allow Mario to traverse dangerous environments, such as spikes and lava.

After Peach's castle is sent back to the ground and Mario defeats Bowser, he recounts his tale to Luigi, who had remained at home while Mario went on the adventure. Peach throws a huge party to honor Mario and his allies for saving the entire kingdom, which is then followed by a parade during the credits.

== Development ==
Paper Mario was developed by Intelligent Systems. Shigeru Miyamoto served as producer and consulted on the project. Kumiko Takeda and Kaori Aoki wrote the game's script, while Naohiko Aoyama was the art director responsible for the game's distinctive graphical style. Nintendo approached Square, who had developed Super Mario RPG for the Super Nintendo Entertainment System, to develop the game, but they turned down the offer due to work on Final Fantasy VII. Instead, the company initially hired HAL Laboratory to write the main story before development was handed over to Intelligent Systems to develop the game. The game was initially called Super Mario RPG 2, was slated for release on the 64DD, and was first revealed at Nintendo Space World '97, a video game trade show hosted by Nintendo. However, the development moved to cartridge format instead. Aoyama took inspiration from the graphics of PaRappa the Rapper, cel animation, and the work of Walt Disney and Looney Tunes for the art style. According to producer Hiroyasu Sasano, the series' distinct paper-like style for character graphics came about from the belief that players "might be getting tired" of the computer-generated 3D graphics seen on consoles like the PlayStation as it was difficult for polygons to bring out the characters' "cuteness". Miyamoto stated that the game was being developed with amateur gamers in mind. The game later released for the iQue Player in 2004. Paper Mario saw a number of re-releases for later Nintendo consoles: the Wii Virtual Console in July 2007, the Wii U Virtual Console in April 2015, and via the Nintendo Classics service in December 2021. In 2023, Paper Mario was fully decompiled, making an unofficial PC port and mods possible.

The game had a marketing budget of $4 million.

=== Music ===
The game's soundtrack was first released in Japan on September 21, 2000, with the game's original title by Enterbrain, and distributed by the magazine Famitsu. It was followed in the United States a few months later as a Nintendo Power exclusive with the illustration from the international game cover. It included both the original music to the game, as well as sound effects, in 78 tracks on two discs. The Nintendo Music service features the same 78 tracks on the soundtrack plus seventy more for the app. All of the game's compositions were written by Yuka Tsujiyoko, with a reprised arrangement of previous Super Mario themes by Koji Kondo. The game's other event and sound effects music were composed by Taishi Senda. The game's music mostly received positive reviews, with Lucas M. Thomas of IGN describing it as "vividly appointed with catchy, expressive tunes and comical audio cues."

== Reception and legacy ==
Reception

Aggregate scores
| Aggregator | Score |
|---|---|
| GameRankings | 88.81% |
| Metacritic | 93/100 (Note: Based on 15 reviews) |

Review scores
| Publication | Score |
|---|---|
| AllGame | 4/5 |
| Edge | 7/10 |
| Electronic Gaming Monthly | 9.33/10 |
| Eurogamer | 9/10 |
| Famitsu | 8/10, 8/10, 8/10, 9/10 |
| GameFan | 358/400 (Import) |
| GamePro | 4/5 (Note: GamePro scored Paper Mario two 4/5 scores for fun factor and sound, a 5/5 for control and a 3/5 for graphics.) |
| GameRevolution | B+ |
| GameSpot | 9.5/10 |
| IGN | 9/10 |
| N64 Magazine | 90% (EU); 85% (JP) |
| Next Generation | 5/5 |
| NGamer | 94/100 |
| Nintendo Life | 10/10 |
| Nintendo Power | 4.5/5 |
| Official Nintendo Magazine | 93% |
| X-Play | 4/5 |

Paper Mario received critical acclaim, receiving a 93/100 on review aggregator website Metacritic based on 15 reviews. The game was the top-selling game in Japan on the week of its release, selling more than 276,000 copies, and the top-selling game for two weeks in other regions. It was ranked #141 on Electronic Gaming Monthly's "Greatest 200 Videogames of their Time" in February 2006, the 63rd best game made on a Nintendo system in Nintendo Power's "Top 200 Games" list, and the 13th greatest Nintendo 64 game of all time by the same magazine. It currently ranks as the sixth-highest scoring Nintendo 64 game on Metacritic, the ninth highest rated video game of 2001, and the highest-scoring Nintendo 64 game released that year.

IGN's Matt Casamassina praised the game's accessibility, commenting that "it serves as the perfect introductory game to any person hoping to explore the genre". Nonetheless, other reviewers complained about the "brain-dead easy" puzzles and bosses requiring "basic strategy at best". The game's nostalgic value was lauded, with reviewers noting the sense of familiarity with the Mario series present in the game's settings and characters. The game has often been compared to the previous Mario RPG title, Super Mario RPG. Eurogamer''s Tom Bramwell judged that "Paper Mario is a vastly superior game to SMRPG", while IGN compared the game's simple plot unfavourably with the SNES game, and RPGFan claimed that some of Paper Mario's story was copied from it. RPGFan also questioned the name of Paper Mario, as there were, in their opinion, insufficient gameplay features or aspects which used the paper theme to justify the name.

Critics lauded the game's blend of RPG and platforming aspects. GameSpot noted the "exciting and somewhat strategic" battle system, which requires the player exploit the enemies' weak points. The "refreshing" action command features was praised in particular for adding originality to a battle formula that was present in many games of the same genre. IGN claimed the game was "the best RPG for Nintendo 64", calling it "fantastically deep, intuitively designed, and wonderfully rewarding". Despite this, enemy design itself was bemoaned for being "corny and generic", with notable exceptions to some of the Paper Mario's original boss characters. Eurogamer noted how "Of the various characters you meet, none is of less importance than any other", welcoming the partner characters and their relating puzzles. GameSpot praised the game's use of humour and side quests, with references to the control of Peach in particular.

The reaction to the game's visuals was generally positive. IGN noted some paper-based visual effects such as when Mario folds in a bed to sleep, but complained about character zoom-ins, which revealed "a pixelated mass of colors". Although reviewers claimed that the novel graphical style was initially confusing, most welcomed the style eventually, with GameSpot claiming that it was "extremely well done". The audio was also mainly praised, although reviewers criticised the lack of voice acting and character-specific sound effects. RPGFan was particularly critical of the game's "generic filler music", despite enjoying use of multiple songs simultaneously.

Chester Barber reviewed the Nintendo 64 version of the game for Next Generation, rating it five stars out of five, and stated that "One of the best RPGs ever, and definitely the best RPG available for Nintendo 64. Even if you've only been buying games for newer systems, this is a must-buy." GameSpot named Paper Mario the best Nintendo 64 game of 2001. It was a runner-up for the publication's annual "Best Role-Playing Game" prize among console games, which went to Final Fantasy X. During the 5th Annual Interactive Achievement Awards, Paper Mario was nominated for the "Console Role-Playing" award by the Academy of Interactive Arts & Sciences.

The game was also well received upon release for the Virtual Console, with IGN's Lucas M. Thomas stating "it's held up very well even placed into context against its GameCube and Wii era sequels, and it's an RPG for goodness sakes". Paper Mario also proved popular on the Virtual Console, reaching a high of "second most downloaded game" in the US in August 2007.

In 2023, enthusiasts fully decompiled the game's ROM into human-readable C code.

On August 11, 2025, during Paper Mario's 25th anniversary, Famitsu praised the game, specifically highlighting the Princess Peach segments.
