= Paper Mario =

Video game series

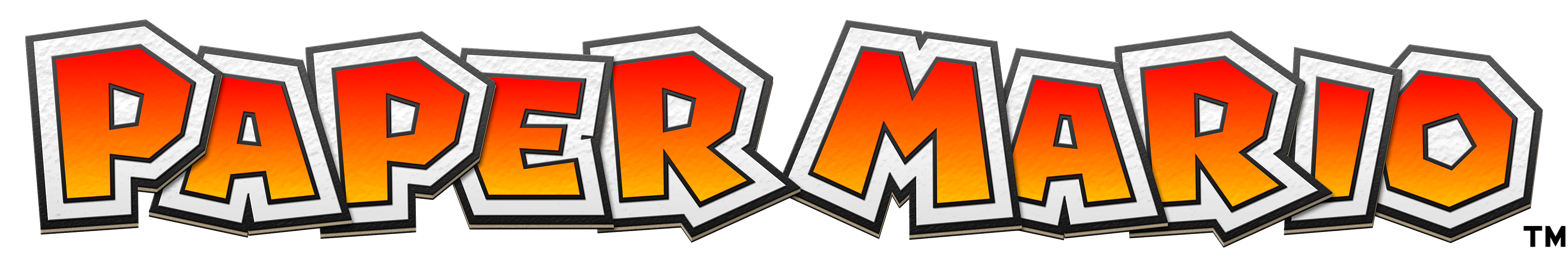
- Logo since 2012
- Genres: Role-playing; Action-adventure
- Developers: Intelligent Systems; AlphaDream (2015)
- Publisher: Nintendo
- Platforms: Nintendo 64; GameCube; Wii; Nintendo 3DS; Wii U; Nintendo Switch
- First release: Paper Mario; August 11, 2000
- Latest release: Paper Mario: The Thousand-Year Door; May 23, 2024
- Parent series: Mario

Paper Mario is a video game series and part of the Mario franchise, developed by Intelligent Systems and published by Nintendo. It combines elements from the role-playing, action-adventure, and puzzle genres. Players control a paper cutout version of Mario, usually with allies, on a quest to defeat the antagonist. The series consists of six games and one spin-off; the first, Paper Mario (2000), was released for the Nintendo 64, and the most recent, a 2024 remake of 2004's Paper Mario: The Thousand-Year Door, for the Nintendo Switch.

The original Paper Mario began as a sequel to Super Mario RPG (1996), developed by Square for the Super Nintendo Entertainment System. Changes in development resulted in the game becoming a standalone game titled Mario Story in Japan. Although the early games in the series were well-received, Kensuke Tanabe wanted each one to have different genre and core gameplay elements. This led the series to slowly move genres from role-playing to action-adventure, though some role-playing elements are still present later in the series.

The first two games in the series, Paper Mario and The Thousand-Year Door, received critical acclaim, and were praised for their story, characters, and unique gameplay. Despite deviating from the RPG style, Super Paper Mario generally received positive reviews. When Paper Mario: Sticker Star was released in 2012, the series began to receive many complaints about its change in genre, removal of original fictional races, and less unique character designs, but continued to garner praise for its writing, characters, music, and enhanced paper-inspired visuals. Super Paper Mario is the best-selling game in the series, with 4.3 million sales as of 2019. The series has collectively sold 12.54 million copies.

Several Paper Mario games were nominated for at least one award; The Thousand-Year Door won "Role Playing Game of the Year" at the 2005 Interactive Achievement Awards, Super Paper Mario won "Outstanding Role Playing Game" at the 12th Satellite Awards in 2007, and Sticker Star won "Handheld Game of the Year" at the 16th Annual D.I.C.E. Awards in 2012. The Origami King was nominated for three, the most at once for the series. The games, mainly the first two titles, have inspired various indie games including Bug Fables: The Everlasting Sapling. Numerous Paper Mario elements have also been included in the Super Smash Bros. series.

== Gameplay ==
In the series, Mario is tasked with a quest to explore either the Mushroom Kingdom or a similar world. Each game divides the world into several explorable areas that contain puzzles and interactive elements, such as obstacles that Mario has to hit with his hammer, that need to be completed to progress in the story. The locations are designed to look as if they are made out of paper, and contain coins and other collectibles, such as hidden trophies. There are also non-player characters (NPCs) which Mario can talk to. All games except Super Paper Mario feature a turn-based combat system, where Mario and one or more opponents take turns attacking one another.

Turn-based combat against one of many original fictional species as seen here in Paper Mario: The Thousand-Year Door

The first two games, Paper Mario and Paper Mario: The Thousand-Year Door, feature elements similar to that of a typical role-playing video game (RPG). Mario encounters multiple allies that join him on his journey, who can help complete tasks in the worlds and fight in combat, the latter of which is similar to other RPG games. The player can either perform a regular attack, where they time a button-press on the controller to deal more damage, or use a special attack, which is more powerful but consumes flower points (FP)—an in-game statistic—when used. When defeating an enemy, experience points (known in-game as Star Points, or SP) are awarded, which makes Mario and his allies more powerful as they progress. Upgrades to special attacks can be found in the overworlds.

Super Paper Mario, the third game in the series, deviates from the RPG genre and plays more as a platform game instead. Unlike the previous two games, which use a turn-based combat system, Mario does not enter a combat phase and instead fights the enemy in the overworld in real-time. XP is still awarded for defeating enemies. Although Mario does not fight alongside unique partners, Luigi, Princess Peach, and Bowser are playable and a part of Mario's party. In addition, allies known as Pixls, which grant abilities for combat and traversing levels, can be summoned and used.

Since Paper Mario: Sticker Star, the Paper Mario games were aimed more towards the action-adventure genre. RPG elements, such as experience points, allies, a complex plot and variety of fictional races, were reduced. It instead emphasized puzzle-solving, a new experience point system, and new strategic and somewhat puzzle-like gameplay around combat.

== Games ==
Release timeline Main entries in bold
2000	**Paper Mario**
2001
2002
2003
2004	**Thousand Year Door** (original)
2005
2006
2007	**Super Paper Mario**
2008
2009
2010
2011
2012	**Sticker Star**
2013
2014
2015	Mario & Luigi: Paper Jam
2016	**Color Splash**
2017
2018
2019
2020	**The Origami King**
2021
2022
2023
2024	Thousand-Year Door (remake)

=== Main series ===
==== Paper Mario (2000) ====
Paper Mario (Note: Known in Japan as Mario Story (マリオストーリー)) is a 2000 role-playing video game (RPG) released for the Nintendo 64 in 2000 in Japan, and 2001 worldwide. The game was later re-released on the iQue Player in 2004, the Wii Virtual Console in 2007, the Wii U Virtual Console in 2015, and via Nintendo Classics in 2021. In Paper Mario, Bowser kidnaps Princess Peach and steals the seven Star Spirits and the Star Rod to make himself invincible. Mario must save the imprisoned Star Spirits, defeat Bowser, and save the Mushroom Kingdom.

Gameplay centers around Mario and his allies solving puzzles, with many of the challenges designed around one of the characters' unique abilities. Mario encounters multiple partners as the game progresses. In combat, Mario and his allies have special abilities that consume FP when executed. In the overworld, other abilities can be discovered that can be used in combat.

==== Paper Mario: The Thousand-Year Door (2004/2024) ====
Paper Mario: The Thousand-Year Door (Note: Known in Japan as Paper Mario RPG (ペーパーマリオRPG)) is a role-playing video game released for the GameCube in 2004. A remake of The Thousand-Year Door was announced for the Nintendo Switch in September 2023 and released on May 23, 2024.

The game is set mainly in and around the hub town of Rogueport, where Mario and Peach discover a locked portal that is thought to lead to the riches of a lost kingdom. Soon after, Peach is kidnapped by the X-Nauts, who want to open the portal. Peach messages Mario about her kidnapping and informs him that he needs to search for the seven Crystal Stars to find the treasure. During this, Mario becomes cursed, which allows him to perform special moves such as folding into a paper airplane or boat. Combat takes place on a stage in front of a live audience; if Mario performs well in battle, the audience will throw helpful items on stage or inflict damage to the opponent. Contrarily, audience members will leave and sometimes inflict damage on Mario if he performs poorly.

==== Super Paper Mario (2007) ====
Super Paper Mario is an action role-playing platform game released for the Wii in 2007. In the game, a new villain, Count Bleck, summons the Chaos Heart to destroy and remake the universe to his liking. Mario sets out to stop Count Bleck by collecting the eight Pure Hearts with the help of Peach, Luigi, Bowser, and a new ally named Tippi.

Unlike the previous games, Super Paper Mario features gameplay more closely related to platforming rather than role-playing. Mario can switch between 2D and 3D, which rotates the camera 90 degrees to change the game's perspective. When he swaps dimensions, hidden elements become visible. Mario is aided by other allies called Pixls, who have different abilities. For example, the Pixl Thoreau allows Mario to pick up and throw objects. Instead of a turn-based combat system, battles take place in the overworld in real-time; upon victory, Mario is awarded experience points.

==== Paper Mario: Sticker Star (2012) ====
Paper Mario: Sticker Star (Note: Known in Japan as Paper Mario: Super Seal (ペーパーマリオスーパーシール)) is a cross-genre video game released for the Nintendo 3DS in 2012. In the game, the Mushroom Kingdom is celebrating the Sticker Fest, an annual event where the residents can wish upon the Sticker Comet and have their wishes granted by the Royal Stickers living inside the comet. However, Bowser appears and destroys the comet, scattering the six Royal Stickers across the kingdom. Mario, allied by a sticker named Kersti, search for the lost stickers to fix the Sticker Comet.

Sticker Star's gameplay relies heavily on stickers, which can be found stuck in the overworld, purchased from in-game shops using coins, or received from other NPCs. In combat, Mario's abilities depend on the stickers obtained; for example, a Jump Sticker allows Mario to jump and stomp on his enemies. Other stickers, called Thing Stickers, resemble real world objects that can either be used as a powerful attack against enemies or can be used to solve puzzles in the overworld. Alongside the use of stickers, Mario can "Paperize" the environment to flatten his surroundings and reveal stickers and other secrets.

==== Paper Mario: Color Splash (2016) ====
With high-definition graphics (HD) on the Wii U, the paper-like aesthetic was emphasized from Color Splash onward. Mario was given a white outline which originated in Mario & Luigi: Paper Jam.

Paper Mario: Color Splash is a cross-genre video game released for the Wii U in 2016. In Color Splash, Mario and Peach discover a color-drained Toad, prompting them to sail to Prism Island to investigate the oddity. After noticing the island is also color-drained, they speak to Huey, guardian of the Prisma Island fountain, who explains that the six Big Paint Stars that give the island color have been scattered, later revealed to be Bowser's doing.

Color Splash preserves certain elements of gameplay introduced in Sticker Star. Mario is equipped with a paint hammer; various containers of red, yellow, and blue paint can be found that can be applied to Mario's hammer. When he hits something in the overworld, an uncolored object is colored and rewards items such as coins. The player can use the Wii U GamePad to trace a hole in the paper environment to reveal secrets, known as the "Cutout" ability. Much like Sticker Star, the player pre-determines their action in combat with cards to determine the action and target. Cards can be collected in the overworld or purchased in shops. Thing Cards are present, which function similarly to Thing Stickers in Sticker Star.

==== Paper Mario: The Origami King (2020) ====
Paper Mario: The Origami King (Note: Known in Japan as Paper Mario: Origami King (ペーパーマリオ オリガミキング)) is a cross-genre video game released for the Nintendo Switch in 2020. Mario and Luigi head to Toad Town in the Mushroom Kingdom, which they discover to be abandoned. At Peach's Castle, they discover Peach brainwashed and folded into origami by King Olly. Many other residents, including Bowser, have met a similar fate. King Olly covers the castle in five decorative streamers and Mario, aided by Olly's sister Olivia, head out to destroy the streamers and defeat Olly.

Unlike Sticker Star and Color Splash, the game reintroduces some RPG elements. The game brings back allies, albeit in a simplified role compared to the first two Paper Mario games. Mario has an ability called the 1000-Fold Arms, which gives him oversized arms that can be used to tear parts of the environment to reveal secrets. Additionally, he possesses a bag of confetti, which is used to fill in empty holes of the overworld. Combat emphasizes puzzle-solving on a circular combat field; the circle is divided into rings and the player is given time to rotate the rings horizontally and vertically to line up the enemies and deal more damage.

=== Spin-offs ===
==== Mario & Luigi: Paper Jam (2015) ====
Mario & Luigi: Paper Jam, (Note: Known in Japan as Mario & Luigi RPG Paper Mario Mix (マリオ＆ルイージRPG ペーパーマリオMIX)) known as Mario & Luigi: Paper Jam Bros. in Europe and Australia, is a role-playing video game developed by AlphaDream and published by Nintendo for the Nintendo 3DS in 2015. It is a crossover between the Paper Mario series and Nintendo's other spin-off series, Mario & Luigi. In Paper Jam, Luigi accidentally knocks over a book that contains the Paper Mario universe, which causes the two universes to cross over and spread Paper Mario residents all over the Mushroom Kingdom. The two Bowsers from both universes team up to kidnap both Peaches. Like the modern entries in the Paper Mario series, this game avoids characters original to the series and focuses primarily on characters found in the mainline Mario games. This is the only Mario & Luigi title to use this approach, with Starlow being the only character original to either series who makes an appearance.

Although Paper Jam is a crossover, its gameplay is more similar to Mario & Luigi's than Paper Mario's. The player simultaneously controls Mario and Luigi, who use their usual abilities, and Paper Mario, whose actions are paper-inspired, which include folding into a shuriken in combat, and performing a high-damage attack by stacking multiple copies of himself.

== Development and history ==
=== 1984–2005: Intelligent Systems founding, Paper Mario, and The Thousand-Year Door ===
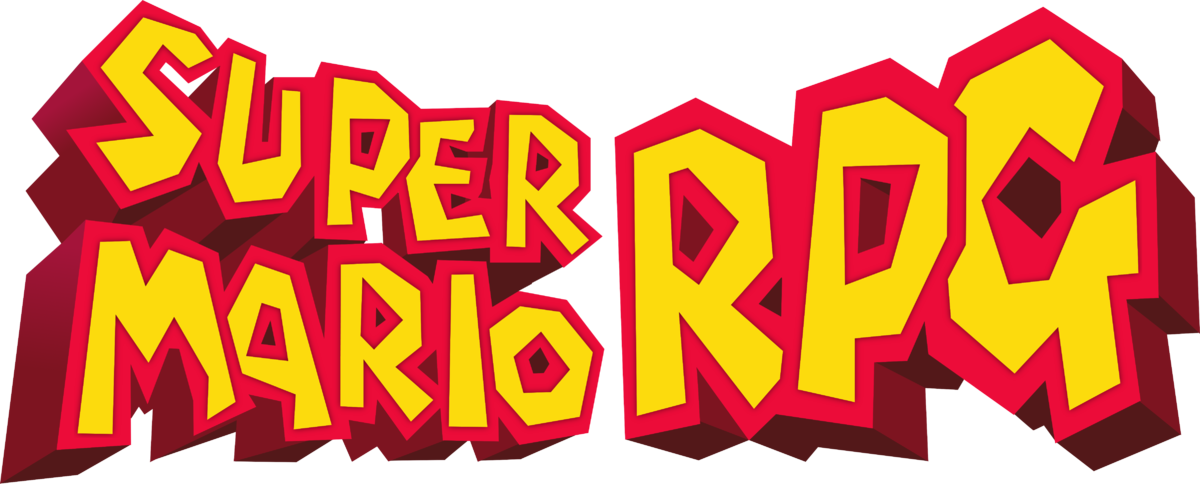
The Super Mario RPG logo; Paper Mario is a spiritual successor to Super Mario RPG.

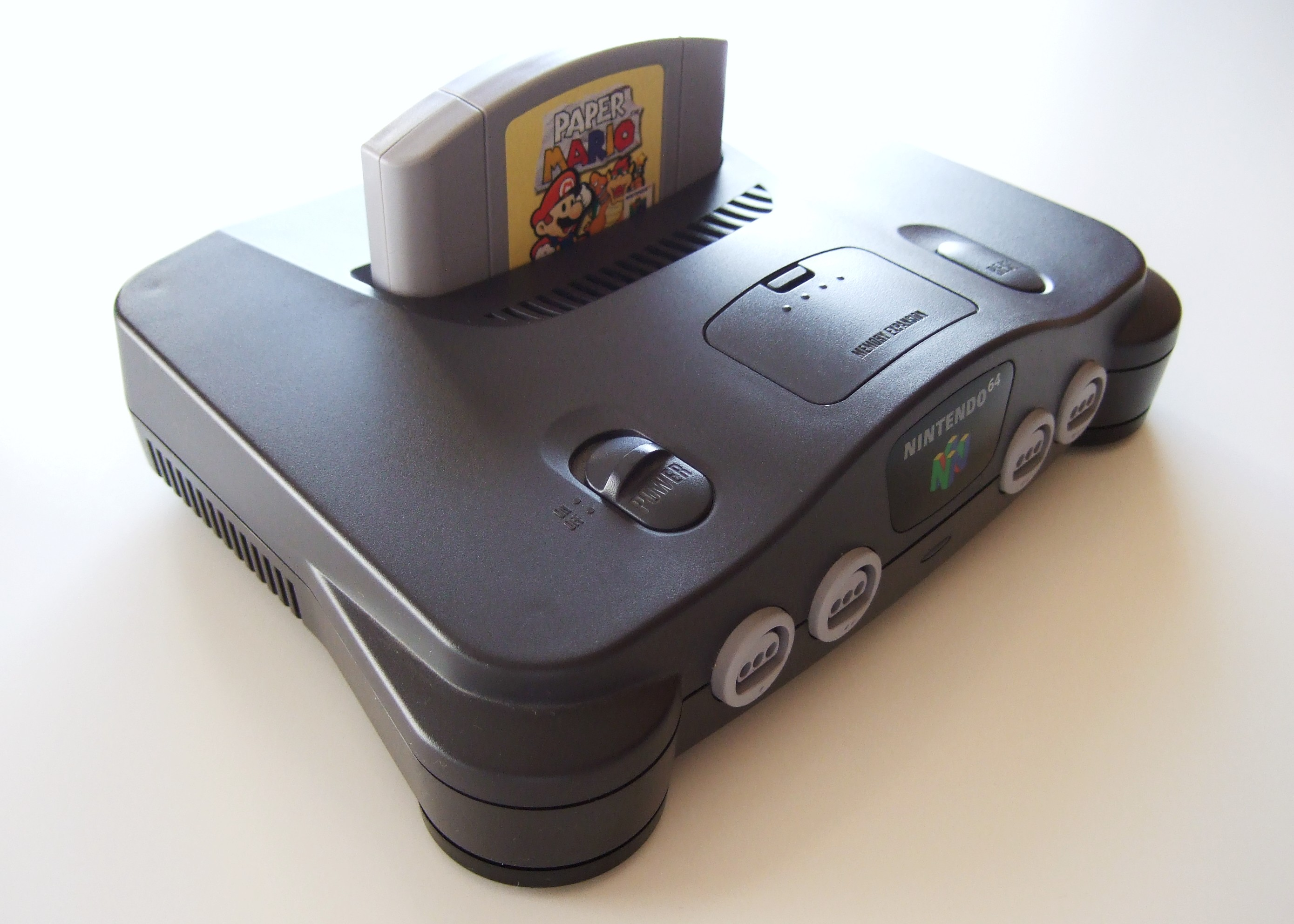
Paper Mario inserted in a Nintendo 64

Intelligent Systems was founded after Tohru Narihiro (Note: Although Tohru is the most common spelling, he is also referred to as Toru in sources.) was hired as an employee by Nintendo to port games on the Famicom Disk System to cartridges in the 1980s. Narihiro went on to develop successful games in the Wars and Fire Emblem series, which allowed him to expand his company with additional artists and developers.

Super Mario RPG, which was released on the Super Nintendo Entertainment System (SNES), was the first Mario role-playing game and was developed by Square. Square used experimental gameplay mechanics, such as timed button presses to deal more damage in combat, to try to ease fans into finding interest in the genre. Although Nintendo wanted Square to create another RPG game, Square later signed a deal with Sony Interactive Entertainment to create Final Fantasy VII on the original PlayStation. Instead, Nintendo hired Intelligent Systems to create an RPG for their newest console, the Nintendo 64. Game development began shortly after the console's release in Japan in 1996. The game, produced by Shigeru Miyamoto and a team of about 20 people , was originally planned to be a sequel to Super Mario RPG, Super Mario RPG 2, used a similar graphics style to its predecessor, and was to be released on the 64DD, a disk drive add-on for the Nintendo 64. Naohiko Aoyama, the game's art designer, later switched the graphics to a paper-like style because he believed players might prefer a game with "cute" 2D character designs instead of one with low-polygon 3D graphics. Development took four years and was released in August 2000 towards the end of the console's lifecycle with the GameCube nearing announcement. The game was titled Mario Story in Japan and Paper Mario in North America.

At the 2003 Game Developers Conference, Nintendo announced a direct sequel to the previous game, The Thousand-Year Door. The game had a playable demo at E3 2004, and was released worldwide later that year as The Thousand-Year Door internationally and Paper Mario RPG in Japan. By the time the game was released, another series of Mario RPGs, Mario & Luigi, was created for Nintendo's handheld consoles. The first game in the series, Superstar Saga, was developed by AlphaDream and released for the Game Boy Advance in 2003. Kensuke Tanabe, the supervisor of The Thousand-Year Door, and assistant producer Risa Tabata drew inspiration from Miyamoto to introduce different gameplay concepts to make the series more entertaining. In a 2020 interview, Tanabe acknowledged the difficulty of maintaining motivation when every game in the series is the same, leading them to explore bigger changes in each game's gameplay and design team.

=== 2006–present: Change in genre, concepts, and philosophy ===
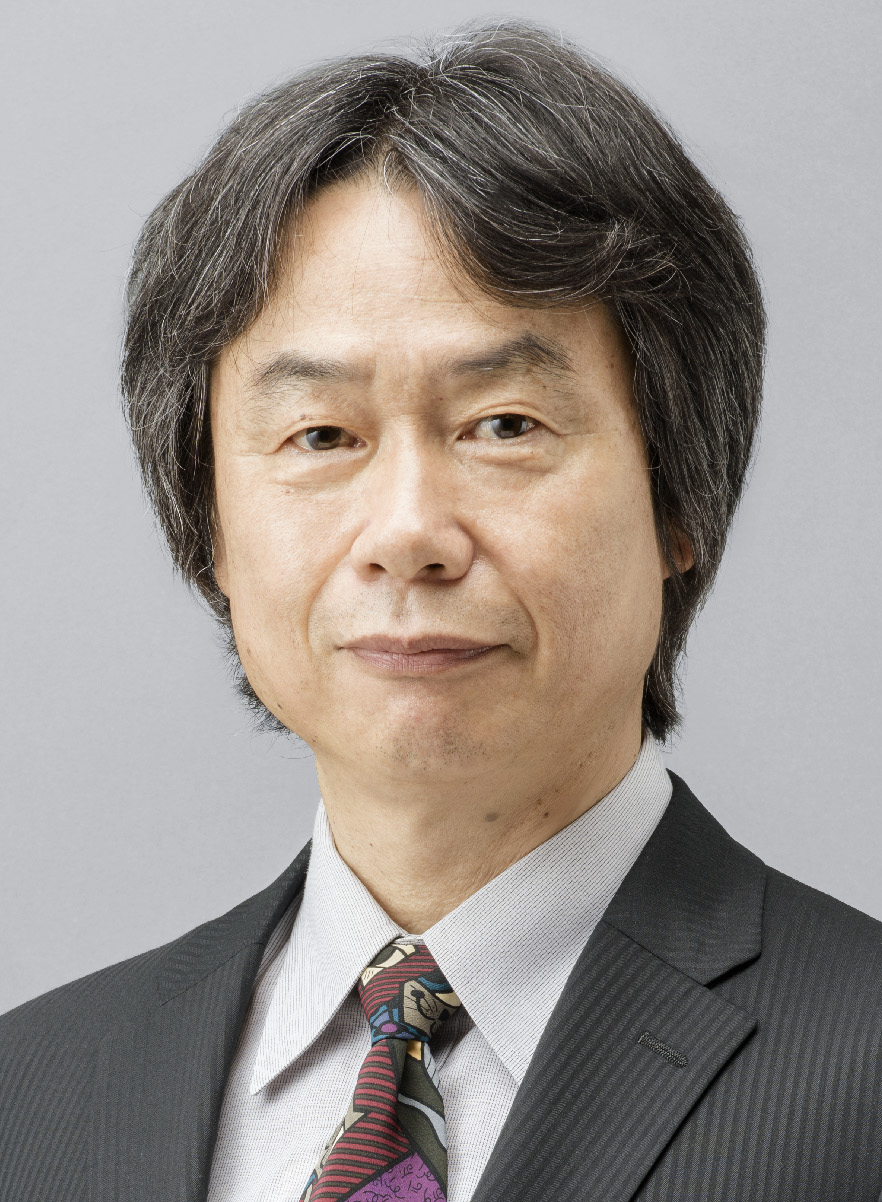
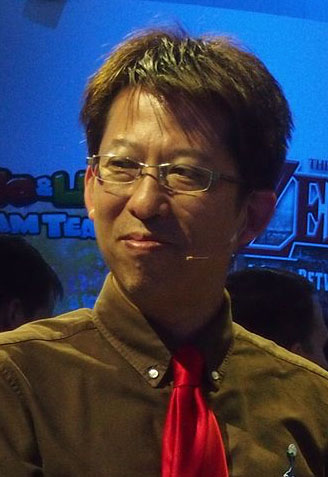
Shigeru Miyamoto (left) in 2015 and Kensuke Tanabe (right) in 2014. Miyamoto was the original producer of the series, followed by Tanabe who produced every game from Super Paper Mario to date, with Risa Tabata as Tanabe's assistant producer.

The series underwent changes in an attempt to reach new and various audiences. For Super Paper Mario, game director Ryota Kawade wanted to surprise fans of the series with new concepts that did not appear in the previous games. When the idea of being able to alternatively switch from 2D to 3D was conceptualized, he presented the idea to the new producer, Tanabe. When Tanabe approved, they both agreed that the idea would work well as an action-adventure video game rather than an RPG, and real-time combat was also introduced to fit the idea. Despite the changes, Tanabe asked the writers to keep the plot similar to a role-playing game's. Super Paper Mario was announced for the GameCube at E3 2006, but it was ported to the Wii in mid-2006 before being released in April 2007. Since the game was intended to be played on a GameCube controller, it did not take full advantage of Wii's new motion controls.

Trailers for Sticker Star were shown at E3 2010, E3 2011, and Nintendo World 2011, but its title was not announced until E3 2012, and the game was released later in the year. As Miyamoto was no longer the series producer, he asked the developers to not create any new characters and instead use established pre-existing ones in the Mario franchise; Nintendo's intellectual property team enforced this statement into future games in the series. He also asked to change the combat system from The Thousand-Year Door, and to remove most of the story elements due to early feedback from fans.

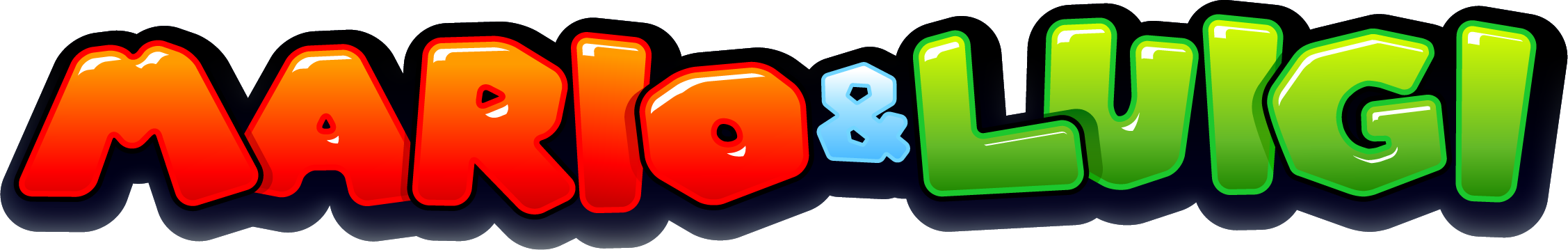
The Mario & Luigi series (logo pictured) was the intended replacement for Mario RPG games.

Paper Jam's development was mainly inspired by Sticker Star. AlphaDream wanted to use a third button to control a third character in their newest game, and felt Paper Mario would fit the role. Every game in the series from Color Splash onward has a white paper outline around Mario; the developers of Paper Jam needed to differentiate the characters from the separate series.

As the Wii U has more graphical power than previous Nintendo consoles, development for Color Splash emphasized the console's graphics and controls. The artists made the graphics look like paper and craft materials, and the Wii U GamePad heavily influenced player combat as the developers found the motion controls fun to use. Producer Kensuke Tenabe limited the variety of character designs and continued to exempt original characters, out of respect to series creator Shigeru Miyamoto. The game was announced via a Nintendo Direct presentation in early 2016. The game received negative reception afterwards, as fans were frustrated the series was following an action-adventure genre format like Sticker Star. Tanabe mentioned that Mario & Luigi would replace Paper Mario as the RPG series and Tabata noted that the Paper Mario series would focus more on non-RPG elements, such as "puzzle-solving" and "humor", to differentiate the two. The game released worldwide in early October 2016 and became the lowest-selling game in the series, possibly due to the low sales of the Wii U and the announcement of the Nintendo Switch prior to its release. Paper Jam was the last game in the Mario & Luigi series created by AlphaDream before the company filed for bankruptcy in 2019.

This game is an action-adventure. I'm sure you're aware that, at Nintendo, we also have another series called the Mario & Luigi RPG series, and so since we already have that established Mario & Luigi RPG series, in order to differentiate these two series that we have running concurrently, we've tried to focus more on the non-RPG elements for the Paper Mario games.

— Producer Risa Tabata, E3 2016

Paper Mario: The Origami King was planned to be announced for the 35th anniversary of Super Mario Bros. in early September 2020, but was instead announced in mid-May the same year. Soon after the game's ROM was leaked, the game released worldwide in mid-July 2020. The Origami King is the first game in the series that Miyamoto was not actively involved with. Despite the appearance of some iconic characters from the mainline Mario series and the return of allies, critics were still disappointed in their lack of role in the plot and other gameplay aspects. The game features large overworlds instead of linear-based levels in the previous games.

In a 2020 interview with Video Games Chronicle, Tanabe reaffirmed from previous interviews that while he makes note of general criticisms, he makes sure not to ignore "casual players" and new fans of the series. With this in mind, The Origami King greatly focused on puzzle-solving. Tanabe said that he could not satisfy every fan amidst the core veterans and casual players, and instead attempted to gravitate towards new concepts, which is why The Origami King used origami as a new paper-like theme. Tanabe explained how the game's writing was kept broad in its context and format so it could be understood by other ages and cultures. He has since kept away from a complicated plot due to how it "led the game away from the Mario universe", and instead created a story where different locales would be tied to specific memorable events. Tanabe also noted that since Sticker Star it was "no longer possible to modify Mario characters or to create original characters that touch on the Mario universe."

As the final announcement of a Nintendo Direct on September 14, 2023, Nintendo announced a remake of The Thousand-Year Door, releasing on the Nintendo Switch in May 23, 2024. It features remastered HD graphics, and retains the arts and crafts visual style that was established in Color Splash and The Origami King.

== Reception and legacy ==
Sales and aggregate review scores As of December 2024.
Game	Year	Units sold (in millions)	Metacritic
Paper Mario	2000	1.3	93/100
Paper Mario: The Thousand-Year Door	2004	1.3	87/100
Super Paper Mario	2007	4.3	85/100
Paper Mario: Sticker Star	2012	2.47	75/100
Paper Mario: Color Splash	2016	0.87	76/100
Paper Mario: The Origami King	2020	3.47	80/100
Paper Mario: The Thousand-Year Door	2024	2.06	88/100

=== Reviews ===
Paper Mario received critical acclaim when released; the game was positively received for its combination of roleplaying, platforming, and pre-existing elements from the Mario franchise. Its writing and characters received additional praise. Publications, such as Nintendo Power and GameSpot, listed it among the best games on the Nintendo 64. It was listed as the 63rd best game on a Nintendo console in Nintendo Power's "Top 200 Games" in 2006.

The Thousand-Year Door is often ranked as one of the best games in the series. Reviewers praised the game's plot and characters, with Eurogamer considering the story whimsical in tone. The new paper-based game and audience mechanics were also lauded. The Thousand-Year Door won "Console Role-Playing Game of the Year" at the 8th Annual Interactive Achievement Awards.

Despite deviating from the RPG style, Super Paper Mario still generally received positive reviews. The concept of changing dimensions received praise, though there were some complaints for underdeveloped gameplay. Some reviewers criticized the plot as overly complicated, but most praised the game's writing and humor. The game was commonly listed as one of the best games on the Wii.

Sticker Star received more mixed reviews than its predecessors. Critics enjoyed the graphics, world scale, and characters, although the lack of character design variety, and gameplay mechanics such as the stickers, were not well-received. While some critics enjoyed the additional layer of strategy, like Philip Kollar of Polygon considering it engaging, multiple functions of the stickers were criticized. Thing Stickers were considered one of the game's biggest weaknesses, and stickers in general were disliked for having only one solution to each puzzle and frequently requiring players to backtrack. Sticker Star was overall disdained by fans for the loss of a strategic combat system.

Upon its reveal, fans criticized Color Splash for continuing the trend of action-adventure installments, and a Change.org petition calling for its cancellation was created. The game was initially disparaged further when it was announced but received generally positive reviews upon release. Most reviewers praised the redefined graphics, and soundtrack, but combat was considered too simplistic and some reviewers noted its lack of overall necessity to the game. Giant Bomb reviewer Dan Ryckert observed that the primary function of coins was to buy cards for combat, which awarded coins in return; he considered the overall system pointless. Ryckert also criticized the depiction of characters, such as the abundance of Toads for lacking in original designs that past entries had.

[The] Nintendo Switch's [The] Origami King is the next great hope then, and while the latest entry does appear to have solved some of the problems fans had with recent previous entries, many series stalwarts are likely to be left waiting for that mythical Thousand Year Door sequel in the sky.

— Andy Robinson, Video Games Chronicle Paper Mario: The Origami King review

The Origami King re-added favored RPG elements and removed unwanted features, though it was still criticized for continuing the action-adventure format. It was praised for its interactive elements, writing, characters, and worldbuilding. Of these elements were hidden Toads, which reviewers commonly called fun and enjoyable, commending their humorous dialogue and interesting hiding spots. Reviewers gave the game's combat system a mixed reception; it was liked for its unique layer of strategy, but dreaded for being difficult and unrewarding. One of GameSpot's few criticisms of the game included the character designs being less charming than past entries.

The three games since Sticker Star were strongly criticized for the removal of elements that made the games RPGs, such as an XP system (which critics believed made combat unnecessary), the removal of new and original characters, and the removal of other unique aspects from prior games.

=== Inspiration ===
The Paper Mario series has been used as inspiration for various indie games. According to Jose Fernando Gracia of Moonsprout Games, the game designer behind Bug Fables: The Everlasting Sapling, the Paper Mario series was a major inspiration for the game's development. Bug Fables is similar to the first two games in the Paper Mario series, which Gracia considers to be the reason for the game's success. He said that creating a combat system similar to Paper Mario was simple, but not as much as maintaining a similar style of humor. Nicolas Lamarche, who is developing Born of Bread with Gabriel Bolduc Dufour, said that it retains core RPG gameplay concepts from the Paper Mario games. He mentioned how his ultimate goal was to curate what made the RPG elements so special. Similar games the series has inspired include Scrap Story, Seahorse Saga, and Tinykin.

=== Sales ===
Paper Mario was the best-selling game in its first week in Japan and other regions, and has sold 1.3 million copies, making it one of the best-selling games on the Nintendo 64. Similar to Paper Mario, The Thousand-Year Door was the top selling game in Japan in its first week, and sold over 1.3 million copies since 2007. It is the thirteenth best-selling game on the GameCube. Super Paper Mario was the top selling game of the week upon release in Japan, and ranked as the third best-selling game on the Wii in April 2007, similar to its predecessors. By 2008, the game had sold over 2 million units worldwide. As of 2019, the game had sold about 4.3 million copies and is the best-selling Paper Mario game to date. Sticker Star sold around 400,000 copies in Japan by 2012, and almost 2 million worldwide by March 2013. As of 2020, the game had reached almost 2.5 million sales and is also one of the best-selling games on the Nintendo 3DS. According to a whitepaper published by the Japanese Computer Entertainment Supplier's Association, Color Splash had sold over 60,000 units in Japan and nearly 1.2 million copies worldwide by July 2020, making it one of the best-selling Wii U games. The Origami King had the best launch in the series, having doubled the launch sales of Super Paper Mario in the U.S., and the series' best launch in its first month. By December 2020, the game had sold 3.05 million copies and is the second highest selling in the series, becoming one of the best-selling games on the Nintendo Switch. By December 2022, the game had sold 3.47 million copies. The remake of The Thousand-Year Door had sold 1.74 million copies within a month of launch in June 2024. As of December 2024, the game has sold 2.06 million copies.

=== Awards and nominations ===
Awards and nominations of the Paper Mario series
Year	Publication or ceremony	Nominated game	Award	Result	Ref(s).
2002	5th Annual Interactive Achievement Awards	Paper Mario	Console Role-Playing Game of the Year	Nominated	
2005	8th Annual Interactive Achievement Awards	Paper Mario: The Thousand-Year Door	Console Role-Playing Game of the Year	Won	
2007	4th British Academy Games Awards	Super Paper Mario	Innovation	Nominated	
2007	Spike Video Game Awards 2007	Super Paper Mario	Best Wii Game	Nominated	
2007	12th Satellite Awards	Super Paper Mario	Outstanding Role Playing Game	Won	
2012	16th Annual D.I.C.E. Awards	Paper Mario: Sticker Star	Best Handheld Game of the Year	Won	
2017	2017 Kids' Choice Awards	Paper Mario: Color Splash	Favorite Video Game	Nominated	
2020	2020 Golden Joystick Awards	Paper Mario: The Origami King	Best Family Game	Nominated	
2020	2020 Golden Joystick Awards	Paper Mario: The Origami King	Nintendo Game of the Year	Nominated	
2020	The Game Awards 2020	Paper Mario: The Origami King	Best Family Game	Nominated	
2025	14th New York Game Awards	Paper Mario: The Thousand-Year Door	Freedom Tower Award for Best Remake	Nominated	
2025	36th GLAAD Media Awards	Paper Mario: The Thousand-Year Door	Outstanding Video Game	Nominated	

=== In other media ===
Various Paper Mario elements have been featured in the Super Smash Bros. series. The most prominent is the "Paper Mario" stage, a map based on multiple games in the series that folds into multiple areas with themes of specific games, such as Sticker Star and The Thousand-Year Door. The map first appeared in Super Smash Bros. for Nintendo 3DS and Wii U in 2014, and later appeared in Super Smash Bros. Ultimate in 2018. Additionally, Ultimate has featured "spirits" – in-game collectibles representing various video game characters based on characters from the series. The most recently added were three characters from The Origami King in August 2020, being King Olly, Olivia, and Princess Peach after having been folded into origami.

== See also ==
- List of Square video games
- List of Mario role-playing games
