= List of video games featuring Mario =

Mario, who serves as Nintendo's mascot, is a fictional character created by game designer Shigeru Miyamoto and voiced by Charles Martinet from 1995 until 2023 and Kevin Afghani since. (Note: Various voice actors had performed the character in select titles since 1991, with Martinet becoming the sole voice with Super Mario 64 in 1996. Afghani became the new voice of the character starting with Super Mario Bros. Wonder in 2023.) This is a list of video games where the character Mario plays a part, either as the protagonist, the antagonist, a supporting character, as part of an ensemble cast, as a cameo, or in a game within a game. It does not include mere references to the character, such as the portraits of Mario found in The Legend of Zelda: A Link to the Past or The Legend of Zelda: Ocarina of Time.

The year indicated is the year the game was first released, most commonly in Japan; games have sometimes been released years later in other regions of the world. The list includes ports, remakes and compilations, but not Virtual Console or Nintendo Classics re-releases.

== List ==
Title	Year	System	Genre	Ref.
Donkey Kong	1981	Arcade	Platform (2D)	
Donkey Kong	1982	Game & Watch	Platform (2D)	
Donkey Kong	1982	Atari 2600	Platform (2D)	
Donkey Kong	1982	Intellivision	Platform (2D)	
Donkey Kong	1982	ColecoVision	Platform (2D)	
Donkey Kong	1982	Coleco Mini-arcade	Platform (2D)	
Donkey Kong	1983	Atari 8-bit computers	Platform (2D)	
Donkey Kong	1983	Family Computer	Platform (2D)	
Donkey Kong	1983	TI-99/4A	Platform (2D)	
Donkey Kong	1983	IBM Personal Computer	Platform (2D)	
Donkey Kong	1983	VIC-20	Platform (2D)	
Donkey Kong	1983	Commodore 64	Platform (2D)	
Donkey Kong	1984	Apple II	Platform (2D)	
Donkey Kong	1986	Commodore 64	Platform (2D)	
Donkey Kong	1986	Nintendo Entertainment System	Platform (2D)	
Donkey Kong	1986	MSX	Platform (2D)	
Donkey Kong	1986	ZX Spectrum	Platform (2D)	
Donkey Kong	1986	Amstrad CPC	Platform (2D)	
Donkey Kong	1988	Family Computer Disk System	Platform (2D)	
Donkey Kong	1988	Atari 7800	Platform (2D)	
Donkey Kong	1994	Nelsonic Game Watch	Platform (2D)	
Donkey Kong	2002	Nintendo e-Reader	Platform (2D)	
Donkey Kong	2004	Game Boy Advance	Platform (2D)	
Donkey Kong Jr.	1982	Arcade	Platform (2D)	
Donkey Kong Jr.	1982	Game & Watch	Platform (2D)	
Donkey Kong Jr.	1982	Atari 2600	Platform (2D)	
Donkey Kong Jr.	1982	ColecoVision	Platform (2D)	
Donkey Kong Jr.	1983	Atari 8-bit computers	Platform (2D)	
Donkey Kong Jr.	1983	Family Computer	Platform (2D)	
Donkey Kong Jr.	1983	Nintendo Entertainment System	Platform (2D)	
Donkey Kong Jr.	1984	Coleco Adam	Platform (2D)	
Donkey Kong Jr.	1986	Atari 7800	Platform (2D)	
Donkey Kong Jr.	1988	Family Computer Disk System	Platform (2D)	
Donkey Kong Jr.	2002	Nintendo e-Reader	Platform (2D)	
Donkey Kong II	1982	Game & Watch	Platform (2D)	
Mario Bros.	1983	Game & Watch	Action	
Mario's Cement Factory	1983	Game & Watch	Action	
Mario Bros.	1983	Arcade	Platform (2D)	
Mario Bros.	1983	Atari 2600	Platform (2D)	
Mario Bros.	1983	Family Computer	Platform (2D)	
Mario Bros.	1983	Atari 5200	Platform (2D)	
Mario Bros.	1984	Commodore 64	Platform (2D)	
Mario Bros.	1986	Nintendo Entertainment System	Platform (2D)	
Mario Bros.	1987	Amstrad CPC	Platform (2D)	
Mario Bros.	1987	Atari 7800	Platform (2D)	
Mario Bros.	1987	ZX Spectrum	Platform (2D)	
Mario Bros.	1987	Commodore 64	Platform (2D)	
Mario Bros.	1988	Atari 8-bit computers	Platform (2D)	
Mario Bros.	2002	Nintendo e-Reader	Platform (2D)	
Mario Bros.	2004	Game Boy Advance	Platform (2D)	
Mario's Bombs Away	1983	Game & Watch	Action	
Tennis	1984	Family Computer	Sports (Tennis)	
Tennis	1985	Nintendo Entertainment System	Sports (Tennis)	
Tennis	1985	NEC PC-8801	Sports (Tennis)	
Tennis	1985	Sharp X1	Sports (Tennis)	
Tennis	1985	MZ-1500	Sports (Tennis)	
Tennis	1986	Family Computer Disk System	Sports (Tennis)	
Tennis	1986	Arcade	Sports (Tennis)	
Tennis	1989	Game Boy	Sports (Tennis)	
Tennis	2002	Nintendo e-Reader	Sports (Tennis)	
Pinball	1984	Family Computer	Pinball	
Pinball	1985	Nintendo Entertainment System	Pinball	
Pinball	1989	Family Computer Disk System	Pinball	
Pinball	2003	Nintendo e-Reader	Pinball	
Mario Bros. Special	1984	NEC PC-8801	Platform (2D)	
Mario Bros. Special	1984	FM-7	Platform (2D)	
Mario Bros. Special	1984	Sharp X1	Platform (2D)	
Punch Ball Mario Bros.	1984	NEC PC-8801	Platform (2D)	
Punch Ball Mario Bros.	1984	FM-7	Platform (2D)	
Punch Ball Mario Bros.	1984	Sharp X1	Platform (2D)	
Golf	1984	Family Computer	Sports (Golf)	
Golf	1985	Nintendo Entertainment System	Sports (Golf)	
Golf	1985	NEC PC-8801	Sports (Golf)	
Golf	1985	Sharp X1	Sports (Golf)	
Golf	1986	Family Computer Disk System	Sports (Golf)	
Golf	1989	Game Boy	Sports (Golf)	
Golf	2003	Nintendo e-Reader	Sports (Golf)	
Family BASIC	1984	Family Computer	Programming language	
Vs. Tennis	1984	Arcade	Sports (Tennis)	
Donkey Kong Circus	1984	Game & Watch	Action	
Vs. Pinball	1984	Arcade	Pinball	
Donkey Kong Hockey	1984	Game & Watch	Sports (Ice hockey)	
Vs. Golf	1984	Arcade	Sports (Golf)	
Family BASIC v3.0	1985	Family Computer	Programming language	
Wrecking Crew	1985	Nintendo Entertainment System	Action	
Wrecking Crew	1989	Family Computer Disk System	Action	
Wrecking Crew	2004	Game Boy Advance	Action	
Vs. Wrecking Crew	1985	Arcade	Action	
Super Mario Bros.	1985	Nintendo Entertainment System	Platform (2D)	
Super Mario Bros.	1986	Family Computer Disk System	Platform (2D)	
Super Mario Bros.	1986	Game & Watch	Platform (2D)	
Super Mario Bros.	1986	Arcade	Platform (2D)	
Super Mario Bros.	1989	Nelsonic Game Watch	Platform (2D)	
Super Mario Bros.	2020	Game & Watch (shell only)	Platform (2D)	
Super Mario Bros. Special	1986	NEC PC-8801	Platform (2D)	
Super Mario Bros. Special	1986	Sharp X1	Platform (2D)	
Vs. Super Mario Bros.	1986	Arcade	Platform (2D)	
Super Mario Bros.: The Lost Levels	1986	Family Computer Disk System	Platform (2D)	
I Am a Teacher: Super Mario Sweater	1986	Family Computer Disk System	Educational	
All Night Nippon Super Mario Bros.	1986	Family Computer Disk System	Platform (2D)	
Family Computer Golf: Japan Course	1987	Family Computer Disk System	Sports (Golf)	
Family Computer Golf: U.S. Course	1987	Family Computer Disk System	Sports (Golf)	
Punch-Out!! (Gold Version)	1987	Family Computer Disk System	Sports (Boxing)	
Mike Tyson's Punch-Out!!	1987	Family Computer Disk System	Sports (Boxing)	
Famicom Grand Prix: F-1 Race	1987	Family Computer Disk System	Racing	
Famicom Grand Prix II: 3D Hot Rally	1988	Family Computer Disk System	Racing	
Super Mario Bros. 2	1988	Nintendo Entertainment System	Platform (2D)	
Super Mario Bros. 2	1988	Arcade	Platform (2D)	
Super Mario Bros. 2	1989	Nelsonic Game Watch	Platform (2D)	
Super Mario Bros. 2	1992	Family Computer	Platform (2D)	
Donkey Kong Classics	1988	Nintendo Entertainment System	Platform (2D)	
Super Mario Bros. 3	1988	Nintendo Entertainment System	Platform (2D)	
Super Mario Bros. 3	1989	Arcade	Platform (2D)	
Super Mario Bros. 3	1990	Nelsonic Game Watch	Platform (2D)	
Kaettekita Mario Bros.	1988	Family Computer Disk System	Platform (2D)	
Baseball	1989	Game Boy	Sports (Baseball)	
Super Mario Land	1989	Game Boy	Platform (2D)	
Alleyway	1989	Game Boy	Action	
Tetris	1989	Game Boy	Puzzle	
Tetris	1989	Nintendo Entertainment System	Puzzle	
Qix	1990	Game Boy	Puzzle	
Dr. Mario	1990	Nintendo Entertainment System	Puzzle	
Dr. Mario	1990	Game Boy	Puzzle	
Dr. Mario	1991	Arcade	Puzzle	
Punch-Out!!	1990	Nintendo Entertainment System	Sports (Boxing)	
F1 Race	1990	Game Boy	Racing	
Super Mario World	1990	Super Nintendo Entertainment System	Platform (2D)	
Vs. Dr. Mario	1990	Arcade	Puzzle	
Super Mario Bros. 4	1991	Nelsonic Game Watch	Platform (2D)	
NES Open Tournament Golf	1991	Nintendo Entertainment System	Sports (Golf)	
NES Open Tournament Golf	1991	Arcade	Sports (Golf)	
Super Mario Bros. & Friends: When I Grow Up	1991	PC	Art tool/Non-game	
Mario the Juggler	1991	Game & Watch	Action	
Yoshi	1991	Nintendo Entertainment System	Puzzle	
Yoshi	1991	Game Boy	Puzzle	
Mario Teaches Typing	1992	PC	Educational	
Super Scope 6	1992	Super Nintendo Entertainment System	Rail shooter, puzzle	
Mario Paint	1992	Super Nintendo Entertainment System	Art tool/Non-game	
Super Mario Kart	1992	Super Nintendo Entertainment System	Racing	
Super Mario Land 2: 6 Golden Coins	1992	Game Boy	Platform (2D)	
Yoshi's Cookie	1992	Nintendo Entertainment System	Puzzle	
Yoshi's Cookie	1992	Game Boy	Puzzle	
Yoshi's Cookie	1993	Super Nintendo Entertainment System	Puzzle	
Super Mario Race	1992	Nelsonic Game Watch	Racing	
Mario Is Missing!	1993	PC	Educational	
Mario Is Missing!	1993	Super Nintendo Entertainment System	Educational	
Mario Is Missing!	1993	Nintendo Entertainment System	Educational	
Mario's Time Machine	1993	PC	Educational	
Mario's Time Machine	1993	Super Nintendo Entertainment System	Educational	
Mario's Time Machine	1994	Nintendo Entertainment System	Educational	
Super Mario All-Stars	1993	Super Nintendo Entertainment System	Platform (2D)	
Super Mario All-Stars	2010	Wii	Platform (2D)	
Yoshi's Safari	1993	Super Nintendo Entertainment System	Light gun shooter	
Mario & Wario	1993	Super Family Computer	Puzzle	
Wario Land: Super Mario Land 3	1994	Game Boy	Platform (2D)	
Hotel Mario	1994	Phillips CD-i	Puzzle	
Donkey Kong	1994	Game Boy	Platform (2D), puzzle	
Mario's Early Years! Fun with Letters	1994	PC	Educational	
Mario's Early Years! Fun with Letters	1994	Super Nintendo Entertainment System	Educational	
Mario's Early Years! Fun with Numbers	1994	PC	Educational	
Mario's Early Years! Fun with Numbers	1994	Super Nintendo Entertainment System	Educational	
Mario's Early Years! Preschool Fun	1994	PC	Educational	
Mario's Early Years! Preschool Fun	1994	Super Nintendo Entertainment System	Educational	
Super Mario All-Stars + Super Mario World	1994	Super Nintendo Entertainment System	Platform (2D)	
Tetris & Dr. Mario	1994	Super Nintendo Entertainment System	Puzzle	
Mario's Picross	1995	Game Boy	Puzzle	
BS Super Mario USA Power Challenge	1995	Satellaview	Platform (2D)	
Mario's Tennis	1995	Virtual Boy	Sports (Tennis)	
Super Mario World 2: Yoshi's Island	1995	Super Nintendo Entertainment System	Platform (2D)	
Mario's Game Gallery	1995	PC	Board game	
Mario's Super Picross	1995	Super Family Computer	Puzzle	
Mario Clash	1995	Virtual Boy	Platform (3D)	
Undake 30 Same Game	1995	Satellaview	Puzzle	
Donkey Kong Country 2: Diddy's Kong Quest	1995	Super Nintendo Entertainment System	Platform (2D)	
Donkey Kong Country 2: Diddy's Kong Quest	2004	Game Boy Advance	Platform (2D)	
Super Mario RPG: Legend of the Seven Stars	1996	Super Nintendo Entertainment System	Role-playing	
Mario's Time Machine Deluxe	1996	PC	Educational	
Mario's FUNdamentals	1996	PC	Board game	
Super Mario 64	1996	Nintendo 64	Platform (3D)	
Donkey Kong Land 2	1996	Game Boy	Platform (2D)	
Picross 2	1996	Game Boy	Puzzle	
Mario Kart 64	1996	Nintendo 64	Racing	
Mario Net Quest	1997	Browser	Action	
Mario Teaches Typing 2	1997	PC	Educational	
Game & Watch Gallery	1997	Game Boy	Minigame compilation	
Dr. Mario BS Version	1997	Satellaview	Puzzle	
Excitebike: Bun Bun Mario Battle Stadium	1995	Satellaview	Racing	
BS Mario Paint: Yuu Shou Naizou Ban	1997	Satellaview	Art tool/Non-game	
Game & Watch Gallery 2	1997	Game Boy	Minigame compilation	
Game & Watch Gallery 2	1998	Game Boy Color	Minigame compilation	
64 de Hakken!! Tamagotchi: Minna de Tamagotchi World	1997	Nintendo 64	Party	
Yoshi's Story	1997	Nintendo 64	Platform (2D)	
Wrecking Crew '98	1998	Super Family Computer	Action	
Famicom Detective Club: The Girl Who Stands Behind	1998	Super Family Computer	Adventure	
Mario no Photopi	1998	Nintendo 64	Art tool/Non-game	
Mario Party	1998	Nintendo 64	Party	
Super Smash Bros.	1999	Nintendo 64	Fighting	
Game & Watch Gallery 3	1999	Game Boy Color	Minigame compilation	
Super Mario Bros. Deluxe	1999	Game Boy Color	Platform (2D)	
Mario Golf	1999	Nintendo 64	Sports (Golf)	
Mario Golf	1999	Game Boy Color	Sports (Golf), role-playing	
Donkey Kong 64	1999	Nintendo 64	Platform (3D)	
Mario Artist: Paint Studio	1999	Nintendo 64DD	Art tool/Non-game	
Mario Party 2	1999	Nintendo 64	Party	
Mario Artist: Talent Studio	2000	Nintendo 64DD	Art tool/Non-game	
Mario Artist: Communication Kit	2000	Nintendo 64DD	Art tool/Non-game	
Mario Tennis	2000	Nintendo 64	Sports (Tennis)	
Mario Tennis	2000	Game Boy Color	Sports (Tennis), role-playing	
Paper Mario	2000	Nintendo 64	Role-playing	
Mario Artist: Polygon Studio	2000	Nintendo 64DD	Art tool/Non-game	
Mario Party 3	2000	Nintendo 64	Party	
Super Mario Advance	2001	Game Boy Advance	Platform (2D)	
Dr. Mario 64	2001	Nintendo 64	Puzzle	
Doubutsu No Mori	2001	Nintendo 64	Life simulation	
Mobile Golf	2001	Game Boy Color	Sports (Golf)	
Mario Kart: Super Circuit	2001	Game Boy Advance	Racing	
Luigi's Mansion	2001	GameCube	Action-adventure	
Super Smash Bros. Melee	2001	GameCube	Fighting	
Animal Crossing	2001	GameCube	Life simulation	
Super Mario World: Super Mario Advance 2	2001	Game Boy Advance	Platform (2D)	
Super Mario Sunshine	2002	GameCube	Platform (3D)	
Yoshi's Island: Super Mario Advance 3	2002	Game Boy Advance	Platform (2D)	
Mario Party 4	2002	GameCube	Party	
Game & Watch Gallery 4	2002	Game Boy Advance	Minigame compilation	
Nintendo Puzzle Collection	2003	GameCube	Puzzle	
WarioWare, Inc.: Mega Microgames!	2003	Game Boy Advance	Action, rhythm	
Doubutsu No Mori e+	2003	GameCube	Life simulation	
Super Mario Advance 4: Super Mario Bros. 3	2003	Game Boy Advance	Platform (2D)	
Mario Golf: Toadstool Tour	2003	GameCube	Sports (Golf)	
Mario Kart: Double Dash	2003	GameCube	Racing	
Mario Party 5	2003	GameCube	Party	
Mario & Luigi: Superstar Saga	2003	Game Boy Advance	Role-playing	
Pac-Man Vs.	2003	GameCube	Maze	
Classic NES Series: Donkey Kong	2004	Game Boy Advance	Platform (2D)	
Classic NES Series: Super Mario Bros.	2004	Game Boy Advance	Platform (2D)	
Mario Golf: Advance Tour	2004	Game Boy Advance	Sports (Golf)	
Classic NES Series: Dr. Mario	2004	Game Boy Advance	Puzzle	
Famicom Mini: Mario Bros.	2004	Game Boy Advance	Platform (2D)	
Famicom Mini: Wrecking Crew	2004	Game Boy Advance	Action	
Mario vs. Donkey Kong	2004	Game Boy Advance	Platform (2D), puzzle	
Paper Mario: The Thousand-Year Door	2004	GameCube	Role-playing	
Famicom Mini: Super Mario Bros. 2	2004	Game Boy Advance	Platform (2D)	
Super Mario Ball	2004	Game Boy Advance	Pinball	
Super Mario Fushigi no Korokoro Party	2004	Arcade	Party	
Mario Power Tennis	2004	GameCube	Sports (Tennis)	
Mario Power Tennis	2009	Wii	Sports (Tennis)	
Mario Party 6	2004	GameCube	Party	
Super Mario 64 DS	2004	Nintendo DS	Platform (3D)	
Yoshi's Universal Gravitation	2004	Game Boy Advance	Platform (2D)	
Mario Party Advance	2005	Game Boy Advance	Party	
Yoshi Touch & Go	2005	Nintendo DS	Platform (2D)	
NBA Street V3	2005	GameCube	Sports (Basketball)	
Yakuman DS	2005	Nintendo DS	Board game (Mahjong)	
Dance Dance Revolution: Mario Mix	2005	GameCube	Music	
Mario Superstar Baseball	2005	GameCube	Sports (Baseball)	
Mario Tennis: Power Tour	2005	Game Boy Advance	Sports (Tennis)	
Dr. Mario & Puzzle League	2005	Game Boy Advance	Puzzle	
Mario Kart Arcade GP	2005	Arcade	Racing	
SSX on Tour	2005	GameCube	Sports (Snowboarding)	
Super Princess Peach	2005	Nintendo DS	Platform (2D)	
Mario Party 7	2005	GameCube	Party	
Mario Kart DS	2005	Nintendo DS	Racing	
Super Mario Strikers	2005	GameCube	Sports (Soccer)	
Mario & Luigi: Partners in Time	2005	Nintendo DS	Role-playing	
Game & Watch Collection	2006	Nintendo DS	Minigame compilation	
Tetris DS	2006	Nintendo DS	Puzzle	
New Super Mario Bros.	2006	Nintendo DS	Platform (2D)	
Mario Hoops 3-on-3	2006	Nintendo DS	Sports (Basketball)	
Mario vs. Donkey Kong 2: March of the Minis	2006	Nintendo DS	Puzzle	
Yoshi's Island DS	2006	Nintendo DS	Platform (2D)	
Mario Kart Arcade GP 2	2007	Arcade	Racing	
Super Paper Mario	2007	Wii	Action role-playing	
Mario Strikers Charged	2007	Wii	Sports (Soccer)	
Mario Party 8	2007	Wii	Party	
Itadaki Street DS	2007	Nintendo DS	Party	
Super Mario Galaxy	2007	Wii	Platform (3D)	
Mario & Sonic at the Olympic Games	2007	Wii	Sports (Olympic Games)	
Mario & Sonic at the Olympic Games	2008	Nintendo DS	Sports (Olympic Games)	
Mario Party DS	2007	Nintendo DS	Party	
Super Smash Bros. Brawl	2008	Wii	Fighting	
Dr. Mario Online Rx	2008	Wii	Puzzle	
Mario Kart Wii	2008	Wii	Racing	
Mario Super Sluggers	2008	Wii	Sports (Baseball)	
Game & Watch Collection 2	2008	Nintendo DS	Minigame compilation	
Dr. Mario Express	2008	Nintendo DSi	Puzzle	
Mario & Luigi: Bowser's Inside Story	2009	Nintendo DS	Role-playing	
Mario vs. Donkey Kong: Minis March Again!	2009	Nintendo DSi	Puzzle	
Mario & Sonic at the Olympic Winter Games	2009	Wii	Sports (Olympic Games)	
Mario & Sonic at the Olympic Winter Games	2009	Nintendo DS	Sports (Olympic Games)	
New Super Mario Bros. Wii	2009	Wii	Platform (2D)	
Super Mario Galaxy 2	2010	Wii	Platform (3D)	
Mario vs. Donkey Kong: Mini-Land Mayhem!	2010	Nintendo DS	Puzzle	
Mario Sports Mix	2010	Wii	Sports	
Super Mario 3D Land	2011	Nintendo 3DS	Platform (3D)	
Mario & Sonic at the London 2012 Olympic Games	2011	Wii	Sports (Olympic Games)	
Mario & Sonic at the London 2012 Olympic Games	2012	Nintendo 3DS	Sports (Olympic Games)	
Mario Kart 7	2011	Nintendo 3DS	Racing	
Fortune Street	2011	Wii	Party	
Mario Party 9	2012	Wii	Party	
Mario Tennis Open	2012	Nintendo 3DS	Sports (Tennis)	
New Super Mario Bros. 2	2012	Nintendo 3DS	Platform (2D)	
Paper Mario: Sticker Star	2012	Nintendo 3DS	Action-adventure, role-playing	
New Super Mario Bros. U	2012	Wii U	Platform (2D)	
Luigi's Mansion: Dark Moon	2013	Nintendo 3DS	Action-adventure	
Mario and Donkey Kong: Minis on the Move	2013	Nintendo 3DS	Puzzle	
Mario & Luigi: Dream Team	2013	Nintendo 3DS	Role-playing	
Mario Kart Arcade GP DX	2013	Arcade	Racing	
Mario & Sonic at the Sochi 2014 Olympic Winter Games	2013	Wii U	Sports (Olympic Games)	
Super Mario 3D World	2013	Wii U	Platform (3D)	
Mario Party: Island Tour	2013	Nintendo 3DS	Party	
NES Remix	2013	Wii U	Minigame compilation	
Dr. Luigi	2013	Wii U	Puzzle	
Yoshi's New Island	2014	Nintendo 3DS	Platform (2D)	
NES Remix 2	2014	Wii U	Minigame compilation	
Mario Golf: World Tour	2014	Nintendo 3DS	Sports (Golf)	
Mario Kart 8	2014	Wii U	Racing	
Super Smash Bros. for Nintendo 3DS	2014	Nintendo 3DS	Fighting	
Ultimate NES Remix	2014	Nintendo 3DS	Minigame compilation	
Captain Toad: Treasure Tracker	2014	Wii U	Action puzzle	
Super Smash Bros. for Wii U	2014	Wii U	Fighting	
Mario vs. Donkey Kong: Tipping Stars	2015	Wii U	Puzzle	
Mario vs. Donkey Kong: Tipping Stars	2015	Nintendo 3DS	Puzzle	
Mario Party 10	2015	Wii U	Party	
Puzzle & Dragons Z + Super Mario Bros. Edition	2015	Nintendo 3DS	Role-playing, puzzle	
Dr. Mario: Miracle Cure	2015	Nintendo 3DS	Puzzle	
Super Mario Maker	2015	Wii U	Platform (2D)	
Mario Tennis: Ultra Smash	2015	Wii U	Sports (Tennis)	
Mario & Luigi: Paper Jam	2015	Nintendo 3DS	Role-playing	
Mini Mario & Friends: Amiibo Challenge	2016	Wii U	Puzzle	
Mini Mario & Friends: Amiibo Challenge	2016	Nintendo 3DS	Puzzle	
Mario & Sonic at the Rio 2016 Olympic Games	2016	Arcade	Sports (Olympic Games)	
Mario & Sonic at the Rio 2016 Olympic Games	2016	Nintendo 3DS	Sports (Olympic Games)	
Mario & Sonic at the Rio 2016 Olympic Games	2016	Wii U	Sports (Olympic Games)	
Minecraft: Wii U Edition	2016	Wii U	Sandbox	
Paper Mario: Color Splash	2016	Wii U	Action-adventure, role-playing	
Mario Party: Star Rush	2016	Nintendo 3DS	Party	
Super Mario Maker for Nintendo 3DS	2016	Nintendo 3DS	Platform (2D)	
Super Mario Run	2016	iOS	Auto-running	
Super Mario Run	2017	Android	Auto-running	
Mario Sports Superstars	2017	Nintendo 3DS	Sports	
Mario Kart 8 Deluxe	2017	Switch	Racing	
Minecraft: Nintendo Switch Edition	2017	Switch	Sandbox	
Mario Kart Arcade GP VR	2017	Arcade	Racing	
Namco Museum	2017	Switch	Compilation	
Mario + Rabbids Kingdom Battle	2017	Switch	Tactical role-playing	
Mario & Luigi: Superstar Saga + Bowser's Minions	2017	Nintendo 3DS	Role-playing	
Super Mario Odyssey	2017	Switch	Platform (3D)	
Mario Party: The Top 100	2017	Nintendo 3DS	Party	
Mario Tennis Aces	2018	Switch	Sports (Tennis)	
Super Mario Party	2018	Switch	Party	
Luigi's Mansion	2018	Nintendo 3DS	Action-adventure	
Super Smash Bros. Ultimate	2018	Switch	Fighting	
Mario & Luigi: Bowser's Inside Story + Bowser Jr.'s Journey	2018	Nintendo 3DS	Role-playing	
New Super Mario Bros. U Deluxe	2019	Switch	Platform (2D)	
Super Mario Maker 2	2019	Switch	Platform (2D)	
Dr. Mario World	2019	iOS	Puzzle	
Dr. Mario World	2019	Android	Puzzle	
Mario Kart Tour	2019	iOS	Racing	
Mario Kart Tour	2019	Android	Racing	
Luigi's Mansion 3	2019	Switch	Action-adventure	
Mario & Sonic at the Olympic Games Tokyo 2020	2019	Switch	Sports (Olympic Games)	
Mario & Sonic at the Olympic Games Tokyo 2020	2020	Arcade	Sports (Olympic Games)	
Paper Mario: The Origami King	2020	Switch	Action-adventure, role-playing	
Super Mario 3D All-Stars	2020	Switch	Platform (3D)	
Super Mario Bros. 35	2020	Switch	Platform (2D)	
Mario Kart Live: Home Circuit	2020	Switch	Racing	
Super Mario 3D World + Bowser's Fury	2021	Switch	Platform (3D)	
Mario Golf: Super Rush	2021	Switch	Sports (Golf)	
Mario Party Superstars	2021	Switch	Party	
Mario Strikers: Battle League	2022	Switch	Sports (Soccer)	
Mario + Rabbids Sparks of Hope	2022	Switch	Tactical role-playing	
Super Mario Bros. Wonder	2023	Switch	Platform (2D)	
WarioWare: Move It!	2023	Switch	Party	
Super Mario RPG	2023	Switch	Role-playing	
Mario vs. Donkey Kong	2024	Switch	Platform (2D), puzzle	
Princess Peach: Showtime!	2024	Switch	Action-adventure	
Paper Mario: The Thousand-Year Door	2024	Switch	Role-playing	
Luigi's Mansion 2 HD	2024	Switch	Action-adventure	
Nintendo World Championships: NES Edition	2024	Switch	Compilation	
Super Mario Party Jamboree	2024	Switch	Party	
Mario & Luigi: Brothership	2024	Switch	Role-playing	
Mario Kart World	2025	Switch 2	Racing	
Super Mario Party Jamboree – Nintendo Switch 2 Edition + Jamboree TV	2025	Switch 2	Party	
Hello, Mario!	2025	Switch	Educational	
Hello, Mario!	2025	iOS	Educational	
Hello, Mario!	2025	Android	Educational	
Super Mario Galaxy + Super Mario Galaxy 2	2025	Switch	Platform (3D)	
Mario Tennis Fever	2026	Switch 2	Sports (Tennis)	
Super Mario Bros. Wonder – Nintendo Switch 2 Edition + Meetup in Bellabel Park	2026	Switch 2	Platform (2D)	

== See also ==
- List of Mario franchise characters
