= Mario & Sonic at the Olympic Games =

2007 video game

- North American Wii box art
- Developer: Sega Sports R&D
- Publishers: JP: Nintendo; WW: Sega
- Director: Eigo Kasahara
- Producers: Osamu Ohashi; Hiroshi Sato
- Composer: Teruhiko Nakagawa
- Series: Mario & Sonic
- Platforms: Wii, Nintendo DS
- Release: November 6, 2007: Wii; NA: November 6, 2007; JP: November 22, 2007; PAL: November 23, 2007 Nintendo DS; JP: January 17, 2008; NA: January 22, 2008; AU: February 7, 2008; EU: February 8, 2008
- Genres: Sports, party
- Modes: Single-player, multiplayer

Mario & Sonic at the Olympic Games (Note: Japanese: マリオ&(アンド)ソニック AT(アット) 北京オリンピック, Hepburn: Mario ando Sonikku atto Pekin Orinpikku; lit. 'Mario & Sonic at the Beijing Olympics') is a 2007 crossover sports video game developed and published by Sega for the Wii, with Nintendo publishing it in Japan. It was released for the Nintendo DS the following year. It is the first installment in the Mario & Sonic series, a crossover between Nintendo's Mario and Sega's Sonic the Hedgehog series, and the first licensed crossover game to feature characters from both franchises. Being the first official video game of the 2008 Summer Olympic Games, it is licensed by the International Olympic Committee (IOC) through exclusive licensee International Sports Multimedia (ISM).

Mario & Sonic on the Wii and DS is a collection of twenty-four events based on the Olympic Games. Players assume the role of a Mario or Sonic the Hedgehog character, using the Wii Remote to mimic sports actions such as swinging a paddle. The DS version uses the stylus and button controls. Both games follow rules and regulations of the specific sports. Sega adopted the IOC's mission of promoting sportsmanship and interest young people in the Olympics by using its characters; following this theme, Nintendo allowed Sega to include Mario with Sonic the Hedgehog, created by Sega as a mascot to rival Mario in the early 1990s.

Critics praised the multiplayer interaction of the Wii game, and variety of events of both versions, but criticized the Wii version for its complexity and its DS counterpart for not offering the same interaction between players. The Wii game was awarded the "Best Wii game of 2007" at the Games Convention in Leipzig. Mario & Sonic sold over 10 million units and started a series of related sport video games to coincide with upcoming Olympic events.

== Gameplay ==
The player twists the Wii Remote and presses various buttons, as instructed, to perform tricks in the trampolining event.

Mario & Sonic at the Olympic Games is a collection of 24 events based on the Olympic Games. On the Wii, the events consist of using the motion sensor capabilities of the Wii Remote and Nunchuk attachment to control the actions of the on-screen character. The player moves the remote in a manner similar to the method the separate games are played in real life; for example, swinging the Wii Remote to replicate hammer throw or pulling back the remote and tilting the Nunchuk like a bow and arrow. While the Nunchuk is required for archery, it is optional for most of the events. There are also events that are more physically demanding, such as the five running events which require rapid drumming of the controller. Some aspects of the gameplay are computer controlled. For example, in table tennis the player movement is controlled by the Wii, while the swinging of the racket is controlled by the player. The DS game is the same in design, but due to lack of motion controls, its events are much less physically demanding than those on the Wii. For example, instead of drumming the controller, players have to quickly stroke the touchscreen.

Mario & Sonic brings together 16 characters from the Mario and Sonic the Hedgehog series to participate in environments based on the venues of the 2008 Summer Olympics in Beijing. These environments are stylized to fit the futuristic style of Sonic and the cartoon style of Mario. Each playable character their own statistics, which serve as an advantage or disadvantage depending on the event. The characters are divided into four categories: all-around, speed, power, and skill. The Wii version has additional in-game characters taken from the console's Mii Channel, which allows the user to create a Mii, a customized avatar, that can be imported into games that support the feature. Both games have non-playable characters who serve as referees for particular events.

"Dream Events" are alternate versions of Olympic events. In the DS-exclusive event "Dream Canoe", players can use items from the Mario Kart games.

Both versions of Mario & Sonic at the Olympic Games have three similar modes of gameplay: Circuit, Single Match, and Mission. Circuit mode is where players compete for the highest overall score in a pre-determined series of events or design their own circuit. In the Single Match, players can choose to compete in each event individually. Mission mode is a single-player option where each of the competitors has six character-specific missions to complete, although the characters' statistics are not as balanced as in the main game, making missions more difficult. The Wii version's Circuit and Single Match can have an additional one to three players competing simultaneously while its DS counterpart has an extra option dedicated to multiplayer called Versus Play. Versus supports up to four people to use the wireless capabilities of the Nintendo DS to play events. DS Download Play is possible for those without an individual copy of the game, however the number of sports available is limited to six events and circuit mode is not available.

Both versions feature a gallery mode where brief facts about the Olympics can be found. There are five categories of Olympics-related trivia organized by history and athletes, with corresponding minigames that will unlock the answer to trivia questions once completed. Classic music from both series is available in the gallery once all levels in a category are cleared. The two versions also have leaderboards that uses the Nintendo Wi-Fi Connection to display the best times and scores in each event.

=== Events ===
Mario & Sonic at the Olympic Games features authentic Olympic events for the single match and circuit modes. The events closely follow rules and regulations of the specific sports. The types of Wii events are classified as athletics, gymnastics, shooting, archery, rowing, aquatics, fencing, and table tennis. Similar events have varying gameplay aspects; for example, getting a starting boost in the 100 m dash is more important than in the longer races, since the initial short burst of greater speed would play less of a role in winning the longer distance runs. In relay events, such as the 4 × 100 metres relay and 4 × 100 metres aquatics relay, players can assemble teams comprising any four characters.

Besides these regular events, there are alternate versions of Olympic events called Dream Events. Unlike the regular events, the gameplay in Dream Events is exaggerated. Taking place in locations and using objects from older games of the Mario and Sonic series, Dream Events allow players to use the special abilities of characters and display dramatic moments in slow motion.

Although the Wii and DS versions of the game feature mostly the same events, each version has events that are not found in the other. For example, the DS version has 10 m Platform Diving, cycling, and five Dream Events—canoeing, boxing, basketball, long jump, and skeet shooting—not featured on the Wii version.

== Development ==
After Sega transitioned from hardware to third-party development in 2001, Nintendo and Sega developed a closer relationship, with the first significant video game collaboration between the two being Amusement Vision developing F-Zero GX for the GameCube in 2003. The idea for a crossover game between Sega's Sonic the Hedgehog and Nintendo's Mario characters had been casually discussed between the two companies; Sonic Team leader Yuji Naka and Mario creator Shigeru Miyamoto, respectively, had their private discussions revealed in 2005. Despite the discussions, the idea was not acted on as it lacked a setting that would give the game "an exclamation mark".

[The Olympics is] about gathering everyone, from young to old, together. And in that spirit, we thought this the best time for Sonic and Mario to be in a game together.

— Nintendo Europe's marketing director on why the Olympics were chosen as the first meeting ground for Mario and Sonic,

The idea of an Olympic setting for the mascots originated after Sega was awarded the license for the 2008 Summer Olympics in Beijing approximately a year later. The developer adopted the IOC's mission to promote a sporting spirit and wanted to interest young people in the Olympics with its newly acquired license. The corporation decided to base the sports game around its characters that "young people love and are very iconic" instead of creating a more realistic simulation. Sega then requested Nintendo for permission to include Mario in the game, setting up the first matchup between their mascots. Nintendo approved and partnered with Sega in-house to add another layer of quality control to the development. Both companies felt that the competitive sportsmanship of the Olympic Games provided an ideal choice as a setting for the once-rival mascots.

Mario & Sonic was officially announced with a joint press release by Sega and Nintendo on March 28, 2007 and premiered at E3 2007. In another showing of the collaboration between the two companies, the game was predominantly developed by the Sega Sports R&D Department of Sega Japan under the supervision of Shigeru Miyamoto. He served as senior producer. Sega's Osamu Ohashi and Nintendo's Hiroshi Sato served as producers, Sega's Eigo Kasahara as director, and Teruhiko Nakagawa as composer. Racjin and according to gaming site IGN, TOSE, a developer known to avoid crediting itself in its works, helped to develop Mario & Sonic. The game is officially licensed by the IOC through exclusive licensee ISM and is the first official video game of the 2008 Summer Olympic Games. The president of Sega Europe stated that they originally planned a number of events, including judo, to fully epitomize the Olympics. However, the figure for the final product was reduced and judo was omitted. The development of the game was swifter than planned; in October 2007, Sega announced that Mario & Sonic at the Olympic Games' scheduled release date for the Wii has been advanced by two weeks and the game had gone gold. It was released in 2007 in North America on November 6, in Japan on November 22, in Australia and in Europe on November 23, and in Korea on May 29, 2008. The DS version followed in 2008 in Japan on January 17, in North America on January 22, in Australia on February 7, in Europe on February 8, and in South Korea on June 26. Both versions were published by Nintendo for Japan (where it is known as Mario & Sonic at the Beijing Olympics (マリオ&ソニック AT 北京オリンピック)) and by Sega for North America, Europe and all other regions.

== Reception ==
=== Sales ===
Mario & Sonic at the Olympic Games was a commercial success. in the first few months of release, it was the top-selling game in the United Kingdom all-formats chart on four occasions. It accumulated seven weeks as the number-one seller, including the first two weeks after its release. The Wii version sold a half-million units in the UK during those seven weeks. By June 2008, both Wii and DS versions reached combined sales of 1.2 million copies in the UK, prompting Sega to create plans on re-marketing the game there. The game went on to sell over two million units combined in the country. According to the NPD Group, the Wii game was one of the top-ten best-sellers for the month of December 2007 in the United States, selling 613,000 units. Electronic Entertainment Design and Research analyst Jesse Divnich argued the game is a fitting example of brand awareness' role in determining Wii game sales. The Wii is an exception to the correlation that higher quality games lead to better sales as seen on the Xbox 360 and Sony's PlayStation 3. Divnich added "To the casual and social gamer, it didn't matter that the game received sub-70 Metacritic scores," the recognizable "Mario" and "Sonic" brand names participating in a recognizable action, "The Olympic Games," contributed to the game's US sales.

As of December 28, 2008, 594,157 units of the Wii version and as of December 27, 2009, 383,655 copies of the Nintendo DS version has been sold in Japan. The Nintendo DS version is the twenty-seventh best-selling game of Japan for 2008. In the same year for Australia, it is the eighth best-selling game while the Wii version is number four. In July 2008, Simon Jeffrey, president of Sega of America, announced that Sega has sold approximately 10 million units worldwide combined of Mario & Sonic and showed interest in again collaborating with Nintendo to produce another game featuring the two companies' mascots. The game is listed in the Guinness World Records Gamer's Edition 2010 book as the "Best-selling gaming character cross-over" with 7.09 million on Wii and 4.22 million copies on DS sold.

=== Critical response ===
Reception

Aggregate scores
Aggregator	Score	
Aggregator	DS	Wii
GameRankings	69.06%	68.01%
Metacritic	70/100	67/100

Review scores
Publication	Score	
Publication	DS	Wii
1Up.com	C+	C+
Edge		6/10
Electronic Gaming Monthly		6/10, 7/10, 6/10
Eurogamer	5/10	7/10
GamePro	3.25/5	3.50/5
GameSpot	6.0/10	6.0/10
IGN	7.8/10	7.9/10
X-Play		3/5

Although the Wii version of Mario and Sonic was awarded the "Best Wii game of 2007" at the Games Convention in Leipzig, it and the DS version received mixed reviews. A common complaint was that Sega and Nintendo failed to set the first matchup between their mascots in the genre that made them famous—platform games. Instead, the two companies threw Mario and Sonic into an Olympic-themed party video game, a move which Tae Kim of GamePro criticized as "a marketing tool" to popularize the XXIX Olympic Games. Although the Wii version of the game was praised for being an entertaining multiplayer experience, it was criticized for shallow gameplay and complex rules and instructions. GameTrailers concluded that Mario & Sonic's lack of "polish and simplicity" leaves the improbable grouping of mascots as its main attraction when compared to other party video games released for the platform.

GameSpot's Aaron Thomas rated the Wii version's motion control scheme as "uninteresting and occasionally frustrating". X-Play's Morgan Webb agreed, calling the controls "non-intuitive" and commenting that the minigames required players to "wave their Wiimotes frantically while pressing several buttons at the same time". Dan Hsu of Electronic Gaming Monthly mentioned that the controls were complicated for a game that should be a "pure pick-up-and-play party game". Tae Kim said the events were "short and fairly shallow" and mostly required players to move the "Wii Remote and Nunchuks in specific ways—rapidly up and down for running events, for example". Mark Bozon of IGN called Mario & Sonic a success due to the entertainment value derived from the slight variety of competitions offered in the game. However, he and several other critics felt that events within the same classification were similar; Bozon noted that diversity was lacking as "five or six [events felt] nearly identical", and Thomas found the gameplay of several events to be overly similar to one another despite the reviewer praising the game for its number of events. Both reviewers favored the more complex objectives found in the fantasy events of the game, which shared attributes with that of the Mario sport games and archery.

On the Nintendo DS, Mario & Sonic was regarded as virtually the same game in design as its Wii counterpart; however, opinions on its control scheme varied greatly. GameSpy's Gerald Villoria thought the tradeoffs between both versions made them equally enjoyable. Andrew Fitch of 1UP.com assured readers in his review that the less physically demanding gameplay of the DS version made the game accessible for extended periods of time. Fitch further stated that in nearly "every case, events [were] far more enjoyable on the DS" due to the requirement of the human body's finer motor skill abilities to control the characters. However, Eurogamer's Ellie Gibson noted that the lack of physical demand reduced the players' engrossment with the game. Craig Harris of IGN had a similar opinion, stating, "Rapidly drumming the controllers is far more challenging than quickly stroking the touchscreen." Harris felt the DS version lost some relevance to its marginally superior Wii counterpart since had a similar design and released almost three months afterwards.

Most publications agreed that the Wii counterpart of Mario & Sonic had clean textures and well-done animations; N-Europe's Iun Hockley thought that each character was pleasingly rendered, and Thomas added that the graphics were "crisp and colorful". Mark Bozon preferred the remixed Nintendo and Sega music and thought the general Olympic-related music "[could] be a bit generic". GameDaily's Robert Workman called the background music "mostly forgettable". Echoing this sentiment for the DS version, Emily Balistrieri of GamePro thought "most of the music [wasn't] too interesting". Compared to the Wii version, the DS version's visuals are of the same style and its graphics are nearly on the same level. Due to the inability to compete against other players online, Harris regarded Mario & Sonic at the Olympic Games' limited use of the Nintendo Wi-Fi Connection on the DS as a "missed opportunity". Many reviewers, including Gibson and Pro-G's James Orry, found the uploading of best times and scores to be a cumbersome process. Although the home console version also has online rankings, it lacks direct competition between players. Disappointed with the aforementioned aspect, Bozon rationalized that the leaderboards "certainly [made] sense for a game like this".

=== Legacy ===
Sonic at the Olympic Games is a Sonic-themed sports game for mobile phones released in June 2008. Developed by AirPlay and published by Sega, the game features five events based on the Olympic Games starring Sonic, Tails, Knuckles and Amy. Players control one character from a two-dimensional perspective through one-button commands. The commercial success of Mario & Sonic at the Olympic Games started a series of Mario & Sonic sport video games to coincide with upcoming Summer and Winter Olympic Games. Titles such as Mario & Sonic at the Olympic Winter Games, based on the 2010 Winter Olympics in Vancouver and released on the Wii and the Nintendo DS in October 2009, sold 6.53 million copies in the US and Europe by March 31, 2010, while Mario & Sonic at the London 2012 Olympic Games, based on the 2012 Summer Olympics and released on the Wii in November 2011 and the Nintendo 3DS in February 2012, sold 3.28 million copies in the US and Europe by March 31, 2012. Sean Ratcliffe, vice president of marketing at Sega of America said, "I think the key factor that decides the ongoing building of this franchise is basically success. Is the game successful? Are consumers happy with it?".
