= I Am a Teacher: Super Mario Sweater =

1986 video game

- Developer: Royal Industries
- Publisher: Royal Industries
- Series: Mario
- Platform: Famicom Disk System
- Release: JP: August 27, 1986
- Genre: Educational (Note: Due to the minimal interactivity of I Am a Teacher: Super Mario Sweater, it is sometimes described as an educational software rather than a video game.)

I Am a Teacher: Super Mario Sweater (Note: I Am a Teacher: Super Mario Sweater (Japanese: アイアムアティーチャースーパーマリオのセーター, Hepburn: Ai amu a Tīchā: Sūpā Mario no Sētā)) is a 1986 educational video game released for the Famicom Disk System in Japan. It was designed by Royal Industries, a Japanese appliance and sewing machine company, in collaboration with Nintendo. The game is designed to teach how to knit Mario-branded patterns on a sweater by hand, with the option for player made patterns to be mailed in to Royal Industries to physically produce the sweaters for purchase. Video game critics have noted that the game is an unusual entry in the Mario franchise.

== Overview ==
A screenshot of a knitting pattern in progress. Instructions on how to knit the pattern are given at the top right corner of the screen, while the current row of stitches is marked by red arrows.

After a user inputs their body measurements and knitting gauge, the game displays knitting instructions and the amount of yarn needed to create a sweater, cardigan, or vest. The software includes colourwork knitting charts featuring characters from the Super Mario franchise such as Mario, Luigi, Princess Peach, and Goombas. The game also allows users to create their own custom patterns, but only in child sizes. The user can then use the patterns to knit a sweater by hand. In the past, users had the option to mail their own patterns to Royal Industries to physically produce the sweaters for purchase. The sweaters could be purchased for ¥2,900. The game was sold at craft stores rather than toy or game stores.

== Development and release ==
I Am a Teacher: Super Mario Sweater was designed by Royal Industries, a Japanese appliance and sewing machine company, in collaboration with Nintendo. I Am a Teacher: Super Mario Sweater was released for the Famicom Disk System on August 27, 1986, exclusively in Japan.

== Reception and sequels ==
I Am a Teacher: Super Mario Sweater has been noted to be an unusual entry in the Mario franchise, with GamesRadar+ describing it as "utterly bizarre". It has been described as one of the "weirdest" Super Mario games by TechRadar.

A direct follow up, titled, I Am a Teacher: Teami no Kiso was released for the Famicom Disk System a month later in September 1986. This entry taught users how to knit by hand. A spiritual follow up, titled, Mario Family was released for the Game Boy Color. It is compatible with the Jaguar JN-100 embroidery machine and allows users to embroider designs.

== See also ==
- List of Mario educational games
