= Mario's Early Years! =

1993-1994 video games

- CD collection cover art
- Genre: Edutainment
- Developer: The Software Toolworks
- Publishers: The Software Toolworks; Mindscape (Super NES)
- Composers: Rob Wallace; Sam Powell
- Platforms: MS-DOS, Super NES
- First release: Mario's Early Years! Preschool Fun (MS-DOS): NA: Q4, 1993
- Latest release: Mario's Early Years! Preschool Fun (Super NES); November 1994

The Mario's Early Years! series is a trilogy of point-and-click educational games released on MS-DOS and Super Nintendo Entertainment System developed and published by The Software Toolworks under license from Nintendo. The three games consist of Fun with Letters, Fun with Numbers and Preschool Fun.

== Gameplay ==
In each product, the player has a number of islands to choose from. Each island contains a different activity. The game highlights any items or characters which are clickable. Throughout the activities the player is prompted by voiced instructions and every word, letter or number is read out. The Super NES versions of the products contain less activities than the original DOS ones. The Super NES versions support the Super NES Mouse peripheral.

== Development ==
To create the games and ensure suitability for children, Software Toolworks hired child development specialists, educational research experts and speech and language teachers.

== Educational goals ==
The three games are each made up of several minigame activities designed to reinforce or foster basic skills and help children in discovering aspects of everyday things, providing them many hours of entertainment. The respective games help children recognise colors, letters and numbers. Fun with Letters teaches phonics to users. Fun with Numbers teaches grouping, separating and organising objects to/from a set as well as thinking about numbers through songs. Preschool Fun teaches learning materials for children on their first school year with a mix of Mathematics and English language. All three products aid in promoting self-esteem, interaction between children and parents, developing new skills and imagination as well as confidence and being positive about learning.

== Release ==
In the United Kingdom the games were released as Mario Teaches Words, Mario Teaches Sums and Mario's Playschool respectively. Software Toolworks also released a compilation on the PC titled Mario's Early Years CD-ROM Collection, also known as Mario's Early Years! CD Deluxe. The game were also released in the French and German languages.

== Reception ==
Reception

Review score
| Publication | Score |
|---|---|
| CD-ROM Today | 3/5 (DOS) |

Computer Gaming World said that the PC version of Fun with Letters "has enough balance between active and passive activities to keep kids engaged for hours". Nintendo Power wrote in December 1994 that Preschool Fun noted that the "simple learning activities provide lots of reward" but that "such simple activities without any game play elements will become tedious even to the youngest players over a short period" and that the digitized voice is "annoying".

== See also ==
- List of Mario educational games
