= Mario's Time Machine =

1993 video game

- North American Super NES box art
- Developers: The Software Toolworks; Radical Entertainment (NES); Knowledge Adventure (MS-DOS and Microsoft Windows)
- Publisher: The Software Toolworks
- Designer: Don Lloyd
- Programmers: Joe Senior (Super NES); Kevin Shapiro (Super NES); Brian Carpenter (NES)
- Artists: Cesar De Castro (PC/Super NES); Rob Oliveria (NES)
- Composers: Mark Knight; John Korsrud (NES)
- Series: Mario
- Platforms: MS-DOS, Super NES, NES, Microsoft Windows
- Release: MS-DOS: NA: 1993; NA: 1996 (Deluxe version); Super NES: NA: December 1993; EU: 1993; NES: NA: June 1994; Microsoft Windows: NA: 1996
- Genre: Educational
- Mode: Single-player

Mario's Time Machine is an educational video game originally released for MS-DOS and then for the Nintendo Entertainment System and Super Nintendo Entertainment System consoles. The Software Toolworks both developed and published the MS-DOS and Super NES versions in 1993, while the NES version was developed by Radical Entertainment and published by The Software Toolworks in 1994. The Microsoft Windows version was re-released as Mario's Time Machine Deluxe in 1996.

Mario's Time Machine is one of several educational Mario video games that were released during the early 1990s; the game focuses on teaching human history. While the gameplay and engine vary between the three different versions, the story is roughly the same: the player assumes the role of Mario, who uses a time machine to return various artifacts, which had been stolen by Bowser, to their correct points in time.

Mario's Time Machine received mixed reviews. Its use as an educational title has been mixed, and the game has been compared to another educational history game, Where in Time Is Carmen Sandiego?.

== Gameplay ==
Screenshot of the Nintendo Entertainment System version of Mario's Time Machine

Mario's Time Machine is set in the year 1993. Bowser, who has built a time machine called the "Timulator", travels back in time and steals essential artifacts from various points in human history to place on display in a museum inside his castle. Because these actions will eventually change history permanently, the player character Mario takes control of the Timulator to return the artifacts to their proper areas in time. In the NES version, Bowser also kidnaps Yoshi, who is freed upon completing the game. The gameplay focuses on teaching the player the historical significance of each artifact (and of the associated historical person); to progress through the game, the player must correctly answer questions relating to the learned information. Mario's Time Machine uses a side-scrolling perspective, with a game engine that varies across all three versions. The player controls Mario using a point-and-click interface in the MS-DOS version, while the console versions use a platforming-based control scheme adapted from Super Mario World, in which Mario can move left or right and jump. Like Mario Is Missing!, the console versions use a password system to order to resume play from a particular game state.

The player begins Mario's Time Machine in Bowser's museum. The museum is the main hub, where the player obtains the artifacts and directly accesses all the game's levels (which consist of locations on Earth in different time periods) using the Timulator. In the Super NES and MS-DOS versions, for each artifact, the player is given the year and place it originated from. For example, the player learns that the "Apple" artifact originated from 1687 Cambridge. The player can then time travel using this information; time traveling itself is a minigame in which Mario surfs through a wide ocean, collecting mushrooms. Collecting enough mushrooms will transport Mario to the time period and location programmed into the Timulator. The player is given a short document describing the life and notability of the historical person associated (e.g. Isaac Newton), but the document itself has some of its terms missing. The player thus is required to converse with the non-player characters depicting the local denizens of the time period in order to learn various facts and be able to fill in the blanks. The player chooses the words from a list of pre-determined words; if the player incorrectly fills a blank more than twice, he is sent back to 1993 and is required to try again. When the player fills all the blanks correctly, he can then successfully return the artifact to its original owner. In the game's ending cutscene, Mario manages to confront Bowser, who then steals back the Timulator to make his escape. At this point there are three possible outcomes based on the player's overall performance: in the worst outcome, in which the player fails to return the artifacts quickly enough, Bowser successfully escapes to an area known as Paradise; in the other two outcomes, the Timulator experiences mechanical overload, sending and trapping Bowser in the Jurassic era.

The NES version of Mario's Time Machine has a heavier emphasis on platforming than the other two versions. Despite the presence of enemies, Mario cannot lose lives or even take damage, so obtaining a game over is impossible. To obtain an artifact in Bowser's museum, the player plays a Mario Bros.-inspired minigame in which he fights Koopa Troopas. The player can then use the Timulator and travel to one of the fourteen selectable time periods. Unlike the other versions, the player is not explicitly told which time period the artifact originated from. The player is instead encouraged to explore the time periods and obtain hints, either from local denizens or from message blocks. Once the player figures out the artifact that belongs in that time period, he can then place the artifact in its original spot. After all the artifacts have been returned, the player is tasked to answer three random multiple choice questions pertaining to the historical periods visited. Answering the questions correctly will lead the player to the final boss fight with Bowser. The player wins the game upon Bowser's defeat.

== Development ==
To capitalize on educational games, which gained popularity at the time, Nintendo partnered with The Software Toolworks to develop educational Mario games. Nintendo licensed the characters, but neither the company nor Mario creator Shigeru Miyamoto were involved in the game's development. The MS-DOS and Super NES versions were developed and published by The Software Toolworks while the NES version was developed by Radical Entertainment and published by The Software Toolworks. Mario's Time Machine was originally released for computers in 1993, with a deluxe re-release titled Mario's Time Machine Deluxe in 1996. It was later released for the Super NES in December 1993, and for the NES in June 1994.

== Reception ==
Reception

Review scores
Publication	Score
AllGame	3.5/5
Electronic Gaming Monthly	7/10, 7/10, 6/10, 7/10
GameStar	75%, 70% (Note: GameStar's review was primarily by a writer that scored it 75%, with a "second opinion" on the side with a 70% rating.)
GameZone	60/100
Super Play	60%
Total!	83%
CD-ROM Today	2/5

Since its release, Mario's Time Machine has received mixed reviews. GamePro praised the game's dialogues with historical figures, commenting that "the scenarios make flesh-and-blood human beings out of people who are usually just static pictures in textbooks". They criticized the Timulator controls as too confusing, especially for the game's targeted age group, but nonetheless summarized the game as both enjoyable and educational. Nintendo Power gave it a 2.65 out of five, while Electronic Gaming Monthly gave it a 6.75 out of 10.

GameSpy's Brian Altano and Brian Miggels named its ending as one of the worst ever, criticizing it for showing Bowser crying. Fellow GameSpy editor Mike Drucker called it "half-assed". GamesRadar commented that those who like this game may like Night at the Museum: Battle of the Smithsonian, which they gave a negative review to. They later suggested that it was an unpopular game, commenting that "five, maybe six people played the NES version of Mario's Time Machine". Good Game called it "awful", and was "way too complicated for any school-aged youngster to understand". Nintendo of Canada included a sealed copy of the NES version as part of a charity auction along with several other sealed NES games. In the book Video Games: A Guide for Savvy Parents, author David Sheff found the educational elements good, but criticized the gameplay.

Authors David Wesley and Gloria Barczak associated Mario's Time Machine with the recent "flood of ill-conceived Mario spin-offs", arguing that these games nearly destroyed the Mario license. The Independent's Janet Swift discussed Mario's Time Machine in her article on the latest generation of educational titles in 1994. She compared it to Mario Is Missing! in its execution, which she found "special", praising it for its educational value for children. Allgame's Brett Alan Weiss called the action scenes "dreadfully dull" and the presentation "merely average". He added that while he does not dislike educational games, they must be both entertaining and enlightening. IGN's Levi Buchanan included it in their assessment of the "other Mario games", implying that the premise was boring and criticizing the game for lacking any real platform gameplay. He commented that it had "honorable intentions", but that it was "decidedly shallow". He also criticized the act of putting Mario in realistic time periods, commenting that he "occupies the imagination, a place with Star Festivals and giant piranha plants".

== See also ==
- Educational games in the Mario series
