= Mario Is Missing! =

1993 video game

- North American SNES box art
- Developer: The Software Toolworks (Note: MS-DOS and Windows versions developed by The Software Toolworks and Knowledge Adventure; NES version developed by Radical Entertainment.)
- Publishers: NA: The Software Toolworks; PAL: Mindscape
- Designer: Donald W. Laabs
- Series: Luigi; Mario
- Platforms: MS-DOS, NES, Super NES, Macintosh, Windows
- Release: January 1993: MS-DOS; NA: January 1993 NES, Super NES; NA: June 1993; EU: October 1993 Macintosh; NA: June 1994 Windows; NA: July 1996
- Genre: Educational
- Mode: Single-player

Mario Is Missing! is a 1993 educational game developed and published by The Software Toolworks for MS-DOS, Nintendo Entertainment System, and Super Nintendo Entertainment System, later released on Macintosh in 1994. The player controls Luigi, who must travel around the world to find and return stolen treasures as part of a quest to locate his brother, Mario, who has been captured by Bowser. Mario Is Missing!, part of a series of educational Mario games, was Luigi's second starring role in a video game, following the 1990 Game Watch game Luigi's Hammer Toss and preceding the 2001 GameCube game Luigi's Mansion.

== Gameplay ==
Luigi is talking to a tour guide woman in a city area.

Mario Is Missing! is an educational game. The computer version is a point-and-click adventure while the NES and Super NES have platformer elements. In the game, Bowser, king of the Koopas, has relocated from the Mushroom Kingdom to the real world where he has set up his headquarters in an Antarctic castle. Bowser plans to steal the Earth's treasures with the use of the Passcode-Operated Remote Transportation and Larceny System (PORTALS) which allows his Koopas to teleport anywhere in the world. Bowser intends to sell the treasures to pay for enough hairdryers so he can melt the ice of Antarctica. He captures Mario to prevent him from foiling the plan and it is up to Mario's brother Luigi to save him.

The player controls Luigi throughout the game. At the beginning of the game, Luigi and the dinosaur Yoshi are at Bowser's castle and Luigi has access to the PORTALS, allowing him to teleport to cities where the Koopas are operating. The player can view a map of the city that Luigi is in, as well as a map of the world known as the Globulator. The player can use the Globulator to control Yoshi's movements across the world, which is necessary to reunite Yoshi with Luigi. The player has access to a computer which keeps track of various clues learned throughout the game, including information gained from speaking to people in the cities Luigi visits and pamphlets regarding the landmarks that have had something stolen from them.

Notable locations in the game include Cairo, New York City, Mexico City, Paris, Buenos Aires, Sydney and Tokyo. Missing artifacts include Big Ben, the Mona Lisa, and the Great Sphinx of Giza. Upon arriving in each city, the player must figure out what city Luigi is in and determine what artifact has been stolen and where it can be found. To figure these out, the player must talk to local people and ask them questions. Each city contains multiple tourist information centers as well as three stolen treasures, which are obtained by dispatching the Koopa who is carrying each one. In the Macintosh and MS-DOS versions, the number of treasures which have to be retrieved from the Koopas in each city varies, ranging between three and five that need to be recovered and returned. The treasure must be taken to the correct tourist information center, where the attendant in charge of the center asks the player general questions about the artifact they are returning to ensure it is authentic. When the artifact is restored, a picture is taken of Luigi with the artifact and is placed into a photo album. The player must summon Yoshi to Luigi's current location so the dinosaur can eat a Pokey that is blocking the level exit leading back to Bowser's castle. After helping five cities recover their missing artifacts, Luigi faces one of Bowser's Koopaling kids blocking the way up to the next floor. After beating all of them, he defeats Bowser, stops his plan and rescues Mario. The ending differs between versions: the Super NES version has Luigi send Bowser flying out of his castle with a cannon where he lands in the snow, freezes solid, and then breaks up into pieces. The Macintosh and MS-DOS versions have him attempt to attack Luigi before he can stop his plan, only for Luigi to avoid him and pull off his shell, leaving Bowser to slink away in embarrassment while Luigi retrieves the key to Mario's cell from the shell. Bowser returns and Luigi dupes him into looking for the key in the snow below, allowing Luigi to kick him over the wall into the snow before then releasing Mario, reuniting with Yoshi and heading for home with Bowser's plan thwarted.

== Development and release ==
To capitalize on educational games which were popular at the time, Nintendo partnered with The Software Toolworks to create an educational Mario game. Nintendo licensed the Mario characters, but was otherwise not involved in the game's development nor was Mario creator Shigeru Miyamoto. The Software Toolworks released the game for MS-DOS in January 1993. Its lead designer was Donald W. Laabs, who saw working with Nintendo as a way to compete with Carmen Sandiego creator Broderbund and hoped to license Mario for that purpose. They were able to get a licensing agreement due to one of the company's executives' strong relationship with Nintendo of America, and because Nintendo was also interested in making educational games featuring Mario. This made them the first non-Nintendo studio to produce a Mario game on a console. They also hired staff that worked on Carmen Sandiego. The lead artist had to attend a Mario art school in Japan to learn how to present Mario characters. Laabs noted that the Japanese branch of Nintendo did not seem to fully realize the deal which Nintendo of America made, and they insisted Mario Is Missing! not be confused with a traditional Mario game. Laabs had no expectations that they could make a game which was of same caliber as Nintendo's Mario games due to the close collaboration between the software and hardware teams at Nintendo. The team made a point of using other Mario games for reference during development. Whereas Mario games are able to pose a challenge, the team aimed to make sure that it could be enjoyed by young children. The members of the team who wanted to make a Carmen Sandiego competitor competed with those who wanted to make a traditional action-based game, though they had to adhere to Nintendo's guidelines, and thus had to find a good balance between a Mario experience and an educational experience. Laabs was responsible for all versions, with each team reporting to him. Mario Is Missing! marked Luigi's first starring role in a video game, followed by the Luigi's Mansion series of games.

Nintendo later re-released the game for their own video game consoles. In the United States, The Software Toolworks had released the NES and Super NES versions by June 1993. By October 1993, Mindscape had published said NES and Super NES versions in Europe. The Super NES version used audio and visual assets from Super Mario World. The MS-DOS version uses stretched-out character animations unlike the later versions. The MS-DOS version was programmed by Jeff Chasen.

In the United States, The Software Toolworks released a Macintosh version on CD-ROM and floppy disks in June 1994 under the title Mario Is Missing! CD-ROM Deluxe. The new version included 127 QuickTime clips featuring 99 landmarks, like the Golden Gate Bridge and the Great Wall of China.

== Reception ==
Reception

Aggregate score
Aggregator	Score
GameRankings	43.50% (SNES)

Review scores
Publication	Score
AllGame	2.5/5 (Macintosh); 3/5 (NES); 3/5 (SNES)
Computer and Video Games	70/100 (SNES)
Electronic Gaming Monthly	6/8/6/3 (Note: Each of the four reviewers in Electronic Gaming Monthly scored the game on a ten-point scale) (SNES)
GameFan	80%/75%/87%/79% (Note: Each of the four reviewers in GameFan scored the game on a percentage scale) (SNES)
GamePro	4/5 (NES)
Official Nintendo Magazine	82/100 (SNES)
Total!	83/100 (NES)
Boston Herald	4/5 (DOS)
SNES Force	42/100 (SNES)

Due to the educational content rather than action-adventure that players of the time were used to, reception of the title was initially mixed. Still, profits of the NES and Super NES versions exceeded $7 million for The Software Toolworks during the second quarter of 1993.

Electronic Gaming Monthly reviewed the Super NES version at the time of its release: three of the magazine's four reviewers commented that the game was too slow and easy for experienced players, but that it offered great appeal to its young target audience while providing good educational value. Reviewers for GameFan praised the game's Super NES version and compared it to Carmen Sandiego. Nintendo Power noted the game's "excellent" graphics. GamePro, reviewing the Super NES version, called the game "a good way to learn geography" but wrote that players should not expect it to be exciting. The magazine also noted that younger players would need help in progressing through the game.

Nintendo Magazine System UK reviewed the Super NES version and wrote that it succeeded as both an educational and entertaining game, while noting it would only be suitable for people of a certain age. SNES Force criticized the graphics and the restricted gameplay, adding that it was too easy for older players and too difficult for younger players. Total! wrote that the NES version was not as good as the Super NES version, stating it was missing "a bit of the graphical humour – but it packs in almost as much game-play and educational value".

Chris Cavanaugh of AllGame reviewed the Super NES version and considered it to be "somewhat enjoyable" for children, but believed that adult players would not be interested. Cavanaugh noted the colorful graphics yet criticized the repetitive gameplay and the "virtually identical" appearances of each city. AllGame's Skyler Miller reviewed the NES version and noted the graphics were washed-out and lacking in detail, but wrote that the overall game was "as good as can be expected" for an NES Mario game which was not created by Nintendo. Miller mentioned that the game should appeal to younger players because of its "relatively seamless" combination of instruction and action. Lisa Karen Savignano of AllGame reviewed the Macintosh version and considered it to be an enjoyable game with adequate graphics, but also stated that it was a simple game intended for young players. Savignano called the music "quite nice", but noted the basic sound effects and the lack of voiceovers.

Critical consensus of the game has changed over time. Luke Plunkett of Kotaku wrote in 2012 that unlike the NES and Super NES versions, the PC version "was the star, featuring not only more content but better visuals as well". He considered the game "awful" and not very educational. Kevin Wong of Kotaku noted in 2015 that the game was poorly received in many online reviews, although Wong himself praised the character animations and music. He opined that the backlash against Mario Is Missing! comes down to measured expectations; what is suitable or primally engaging at a young age could be dull and tedious at another.

In 2016, Samuel Roberts of PC Gamer noted the computer version had poor pixel art and that every street has the same buildings on it, and all the NPCs are the same regardless of where the players are going. Roberts also wrote that the game was "conceptually baffling and hated" by Nintendo fans. In 2017, Seth Macy of IGN included the game on a list of the "Weirdest Mario Games Ever Made", writing that the game's weirdest aspect is how Bowser weaponizes climate change to melt the ice of Antarctica, flooding the Earth so he can steal landmarks.

Mario Is Missing! garnered $7 million in the second quarter of 1993, and kickstarted multiple educational games in the Mario series. Despite negative reception, lead designer Donald W. Laabs acknowledged the reality of game development, while also acknowledging that the marketing of it as a traditional Mario game earned criticism.

== Successor ==
In 1993, a follow-up to Mario Is Missing! was released, titled Mario’s Time Machine. Unlike its predecessor, which focused on cities, this game centered around historical figures and their artifacts as the main subjects of learning.

== In popular culture ==
The sprite of Luigi from the game became an Internet meme known as Weegee.

== See also ==
- List of Mario educational games
