= Mario's Game Gallery =

1995 video game

- Developers: Presage Software; Brainstorm Entertainment (Mario's FUNdamentals)
- Publishers: Interplay Productions; Mindscape (PC version of Mario's FUNdamentals); Stepping Stone (Mac version of Mario's FUNdamentals)
- Producer: Thomas R. Decker
- Programmer: Roger Sherron
- Composers: Michael Pukish; Brian Salter; Matthew Berardo
- Series: Mario
- Platforms: MS-DOS, Windows, Classic Mac OS
- Release: 1995
- Genre: Compilation
- Mode: Single-player

Mario's Game Gallery (later re-released as Mario's FUNdamentals) is an American compilation of games published by Interplay Productions and developed by Presage Software for MS-DOS, Windows, and Classic Mac OS. It was released in 1995 in the United States. It was re-released as Mario's FUNdamentals for Mac in 1996 (published by Stepping Stone) and for Windows in January 1997 (published by Mindscape). It was also developed by Brainstorm Entertainment.

The game includes five traditional games: checkers, backgammon, Go Fish, dominoes, and "yacht", a version of Yahtzee. Players play against Mario in these games, which play similarly to their real world counterparts, though with themes based on the Mario universe.

Since their releases, both versions have received mixed reception; while publications such as The State and the Los Angeles Times found the game to be a good educational game, authors David Wesley and Gloria Barczak blamed it in part for almost destroying the Mario brand. Official Nintendo Magazine listed it as one of the rarest Mario games as well.

== Gameplay ==
The player playing backgammon against Mario, one of multiple games available

Mario's Game Gallery consists of five games: checkers, Go Fish, dominoes, backgammon, and "yacht", a version of Yahtzee. In these games, players face off against Mario. The games all play similarly to their real world counterparts, featuring pieces based on the Mario universe.

== Release ==
Mario's Game Gallery was developed by Presage Software for MS-DOS and published in 1995 by Interplay Entertainment. It was re-released as Mario's FUNdamentals by Mindscape; Stepping Stone published the Classic Mac OS version.

== Reception ==
Since their releases, both Mario's Game Gallery and its revision, Mario's FUNdamentals, have received mixed reception. The State praised it for providing fun for whole family, describing the games included as "excellent". The Miami Herald praised its "sharp" graphics and "fun" animations, as well as the music, which they claim to be based on music from the Mario series. Like The State, they describe it as "fun for the whole family", though they criticized it for being too difficult at times. However, they recommend it for first-time PC users who want an "easy-to-install product for the new CD-ROM". The Advocate called it a fun game, and praised Martinet for his Mario voice, stating that small children will "giggle with delight". The Los Angeles Times included it in an article of educational video games that would appeal to younger gamers.

Authors David Wesley and Gloria Barczak cited Mario's Game Gallery as one of the games released in a "flood of ill-conceived Mario spin-offs", stating that it and the others nearly destroyed the series. Official Nintendo Magazine's Tom East featured it as part of his "Rare Mario games" article, commenting that though it featured Martinet as Mario first, most identify Super Mario 64 as his first role as Mario. It was deemed the sixth-worst Mario game of all time by ScrewAttack, who concluded that there was "nothing fun about FUNdamentals".

== See also ==
- List of Mario educational games
