= Mario & Sonic at the London 2012 Olympic Games =

2011 video game

- Australian Wii box art
- Developer: Sega (Note: Additional work by Racjin for the Wii version and Marvelous AQL for the 3DS version)
- Publishers: JP/KR: Nintendo; WW: Sega
- Directors: Eigo Kasahara (Wii); Koji Shindo (3DS)
- Producers: Osamu Ohashi; Nobuya Ohashi; Hiroshi Sato
- Programmers: Mitsuru Takahashi (Wii); Kouichi Nomura (3DS)
- Artists: Hiroshi Kanazawa (Wii); Hitoshi Furukubo (3DS)
- Composer: Sega Digital Studio: Wii: Kenichi Tokoi Naofumi Hataya Tadashi Kinukawa Hideaki Kobayashi Jun Senoue Tomoya Ohtani Teruhiko Nakagawa Yutaka Minobe Shinpei Yamashita Keiichi Sugiyama Yasufumi Fukuda 3DS: Teruhiko Nakagawa Tadashi Kinukawa Kenichi Tokoi Yutaka Minobe Sachio Ogawa Tomonori Sawada Hideaki Kobayashi Takeshi Isozaki Jun Senoue Naofumi Hataya Tomoya Ohtani Tomonari Hayashibe
- Series: Mario & Sonic
- Platforms: Wii; Nintendo 3DS
- Release: Wii: NA: November 15, 2011; AU: November 17, 2011; EU: November 18, 2011; JP: December 8, 2011; Nintendo 3DS: EU: February 9, 2012; NA: February 14, 2012; JP: March 1, 2012
- Genres: Sports, party
- Modes: Single-player, multiplayer

Mario & Sonic at the London 2012 Olympic Games (Note: Japanese: マリオ&(アンド)ソニック AT(アット) ロンドンオリンピック, Hepburn: Mario ando Sonikku atto Rondon Orinpikku; lit. 'Mario & Sonic at the London Olympics') is a 2011 crossover sports video game developed and published by Sega for the Wii. A Nintendo 3DS version was released the following year. It was released by Nintendo in Japan and South Korea and by Sega elsewhere. The third installment in the Mario & Sonic series, it is the official video game of the 2012 Summer Olympics and is licensed by the International Olympic Committee through exclusive licensee International Sports Multimedia. The game is the only Wii title to come in a yellow keep case.

The game on the Wii and 3DS comprises a collection of numerous events based on the Olympic Games. Players assume the role of a Mario or Sonic character while competing against the others in Olympic events. Mario & Sonic received mostly mixed reviews from critics upon release, with many criticising its gameplay as underwhelming. It proved to be commercially successful and was followed by a fourth game in the series, Mario & Sonic at the Sochi 2014 Olympic Winter Games, which was based on the 2014 Winter Olympics and released in November 2013 for the Wii U.

== Gameplay ==
Luigi performing equestrian jumping. From left to right clockwise, the game's interface displays the current player-character, number of hurdles, and stopwatch.

Mario & Sonic at the London 2012 Olympic Games comprises a collection of numerous events based on the modern Olympic Games. The game brings together the two titular characters and 18 more from both franchises to participate in environments based on the official venues of the 2012 Summer Olympics in London. Each character has unique attributes that can serve as an advantage or disadvantage depending on the event. As with the game's predecessor, all player-characters are divided into four categories: all-around, speed, power, and skill.

The Wii version features a total of 30 Olympic events, including football, badminton, horse riding, canoeing, and volleyball. Re-imagined versions of previously existing events, such as athletics, aquatics, and table tennis also appear. The game introduces new cooperative mechanics including "Dream Events", alternate versions of Olympic events that take place in locations from previous games of the Mario and Sonic series, and a challenge mode, which enables players to repeat complete challenges in various events. "London Party" mode takes place on a board game-like depiction of London in which four players may compete in various sporting events and minigames. The ultimate objective is to collect enough stickers to fill up a "tourist book" – the player who completes the book first wins. Upon the completion of any event, players earn scratch cards which can be redeemed in the game's "Bonus Mode" for rewards such as Mii costumes and additional music. Unlike Mario & Sonic at the Olympic Winter Games, the Wii version of Mario & Sonic at the London 2012 Olympic Games does not support the Balance Board.

The 3DS version has over 50 Olympic-based events in single-player and multiplayer, which are split into events using one, two, or four characters. Among these events which are not included in the Wii version include BMX racing and weight-lifting, with the latter involving the use of the 3DS's microphone. In this version of the game, not all characters can access every event, as they are split into five groups of four, and the events they can take part in depends on the group of characters, with some requiring the entire team or choosing two of the characters. Like the Nintendo DS counterpart of Mario & Sonic at the Olympic Winter Games, it also contains an exclusive "Story Mode" which entails the characters from Mario and Sonic the Hedgehog's worlds working against their respective antagonists, Bowser and Doctor Eggman, who are trying to use fog machines to prevent the games from being held.

== Development and release ==
The first game in the series, Mario & Sonic at the Olympic Games, was the first official crossover title to feature characters from both the Super Mario and Sonic the Hedgehog franchises. The Olympic Games were chosen as a setting since Sega and Nintendo felt its competitive sportsmanship was ideal for the once-rival mascots Sonic the Hedgehog and Mario. Sonic the Hedgehog is the protagonist of the video game series released by Sega in order to provide the company with a mascot to rival Nintendo's flagship character, Mario, in the early 1990s. The game proved to be a commercial success and encouraged Sega and Nintendo to develop a sequel, Mario & Sonic at the Olympic Winter Games. Shortly after its release, the vice president of marketing at Sega of America, Sean Ratcliffe, commented that the company would likely commission a sequel for the 2012 Summer Olympics in London if the franchise continued to capture interest among consumers.

Mario & Sonic at the London 2012 Olympic Games was officially announced with a joint press release by Sega and Nintendo on April 21, 2011, after its predecessors sold over 19 million units combined. As with its predecessor, Sega's Osamu Ohashi and Nintendo's Hiroshi Sato served as producers, Eigo Kasahara as director, and Teruhiko Nakagawa as lead composer. Mario & Sonic is the only official video game of the 2012 Summer Olympics and is licensed by the International Olympic Committee through exclusive licensee International Sports Multimedia. A peripheral was considered to launch alongside the game early in its development, although its nature remains unknown.

Both the Wii and 3DS versions were developed by Sega's CS2 division and published by Nintendo for Japan and Korea and Sega for North America and Europe. Over 100 people developed the game, with some outsourced from Racjin and Marvelous AQL for the Wii and Nintendo 3DS versions. The Wii version carries the distinction of being the only title to come in a yellow keep case. Nintendo re-released the 3DS version of the game as a downloadable title via Nintendo eShop on November 1, 2012 in Japan, on May 30, 2013 in the PAL regions, and on June 20, 2013 in North America. The Wii version sold 2.4 million copies in North America and Europe in its first two months of release. Mario & Sonic at the London 2012 Olympic Games was followed by a sequel, Mario & Sonic at the Sochi 2014 Olympic Winter Games, which was released worldwide for the Wii U in November 2013.

== Reception ==
Reception

Aggregate score
Aggregator	Score	
Aggregator	3DS	Wii
Metacritic	66/100	66/100

Review scores
Publication	Score	
Publication	3DS	Wii
Eurogamer		60%
GamesRadar+		3/5
IGN	6.5/10	7.5/10
Official Nintendo Magazine	78%	73%
The Guardian		
Digital Spy		
Cubed3		

The game received mixed reviews upon release. Both the Wii and 3DS versions hold an average score of 66 percent at Metacritic, with the Wii version based on an aggregate score of 38 reviews and the 3DS version of 28 reviews.

Chris Scullion from the Official Nintendo Magazine asserted that the Wii version was a "step sideways" for the series, regarding the gameplay and lack of challenge as an overall underwhelming experience for an individual player. John Minkley of Eurogamer likewise thought the game failed to replicate the "charming" and inclusive formula of its predecessors, saying that many of its game modes remained too similar and "undercooked", despite new additions. While Mike Anderiesz from The Guardian opined that the game may not have done justice to either of the franchise's universes in light of their distinctive environment and visuals, he did commend Mario & Sonic as a "colourful diversion" for its young target audience. GamesRadar+'s Neilie Johnson lamented on the game's overall lack of new content and predictability, although he singled out the "London Party" mode as "fun" and the only part of the game which took full advantage of the UK setting. Likewise, both Mark Langshaw of Digital Spy and Lucas Thomas of IGN complained that the game rehashed many elements of its predecessors. Langshaw ultimately heralded the game's colourful cartoon-like aesthetic and wide array of characters as bolstering appeal for the younger generation, and felt that part of its appeal was that none of Olympic events featured offer accurate representations of their real life counterparts. Thomas praised the game's presentation of London and said that its prominent depiction of world-famous landmarks alongside Mario and Sonic the Hedgehog characters elevated the overall experience to which its predecessors did not emulate. He also felt that the game's non-support of the Wii MotionPlus, available shortly after its predecessor, was a missed opportunity for the series.

On the Nintendo 3DS, reviewers found the game to be largely similar to its Wii counterpart. Tom East from the Official Nintendo Magazine found that the 3DS version was a marginal improvement over the Wii version, praising its "outstanding" soundtrack and the novelty of seeing characters from both franchises interact with each other as factors that add a degree of longevity to the game. Shane Jury of Cubed3 praised the crisp visuals of the 3DS version, remarking that the characters are animated "incredibly well" and felt that the game's overall vibrant and colourful atmosphere and 3D capabilities helped make it stand out from the Wii version, albeit lightly. While IGN's Richard George thought that some of the minigames "fared better" than its Wii counterpart in terms of replay value, he expressed disappointment over the "embarrassing design" of certain minigames and criticised its "shallow attempts" at replicating some Olympic events.

== Notes ==
Preceded by Mario & Sonic at the Olympic Games	Official videogame of the Summer Olympic Games	Succeeded by Rio 2016
