= Mario & Sonic at the Olympic Winter Games =

2009 video game

- North American Wii cover art
- Developer: Sega (Note: Additional work by Racjin)
- Publishers: JP/KR: Nintendo; WW: Sega
- Directors: Takashi Iizuka (Wii); Eigo Kasahara (DS)
- Producers: Osamu Ohashi; Hiroshi Sato
- Designers: Shun Nakamura (Wii); Koji Shindo (DS)
- Programmers: Takeshi Sakakibara (Wii); Hideaki Sekiya (DS)
- Artists: Kazuyuki Hoshino (Wii); Hitoshi Furukubo (DS)
- Composer: Sega Digital Studio: Wii: Fumie Kumatani Naofumi Hataya Hideaki Kobayashi Jun Senoue Tadashi Kinukawa Teruhiko Nakagawa Tomonori Sawada Nintendo DS: Naofumi Hataya Tatsuya Kozaki Tomoya Ohtani Hideaki Kobayashi Tadashi Kinukawa Kenichi Tokoi Mariko Nanba Yusuke Takahama Fumie Kumatani
- Series: Mario & Sonic at the Olympic Games
- Platforms: Wii, Nintendo DS
- Release: NA: October 13, 2009; AU: October 15, 2009; EU: October 16, 2009; JP: November 5, 2009
- Genres: Sports, party
- Modes: Single-player, multiplayer

Mario & Sonic at the Olympic Winter Games (Note: Japanese: マリオ&(アンド)ソニック AT(アット) バンクーバーオリンピック, Hepburn: Mario ando Sonikku atto Bankūbā Orinpikku; lit. 'Mario & Sonic at the Vancouver Olympics') is a 2009 crossover sports video game developed and published by Sega for the Wii and Nintendo DS. Like its predecessor, it was published by Nintendo for Japan and Korea and by Sega elsewhere. Officially licensed by the International Olympic Committee (IOC) through exclusive license International Sports Multimedia, it is the first official video game of the 2010 Winter Olympic Games.

Mario & Sonic on the Wii and DS is a collection of events based on the Olympic Winter Games. Players can assume the role of a Mario or Sonic character while competing against the others in these events. The game features all of the playable characters that were present in its predecessor, as well as four new characters.

The game was a critical and commercial success, selling 6.53 million copies in Europe and the United States while receiving positive reviews from critics. A third installment, named Mario & Sonic at the London 2012 Olympic Games, was released for the Wii in November 2011 and on the 3DS in February 2012.

== Gameplay ==
Mario & Sonic at the Olympic Winter Games retains the gameplay mechanics of its predecessor, controlling an on-screen character through authentic Olympic events with the specific tailored controls for the Wii and DS. However, this sequel's transition from Summer to Winter Games introduces some changes across both versions in controls and mechanics. As many of the events of the Wii version heavily involve downhill racing, such version's motion controls rely more on tilting and turning rather than rapid, vigorous gestures like shaking and waggling. Consequently, some of these events can be controlled with the Balance Board accessory as an optional, alternate method of steering, and the stamina mechanic is also removed from such version and replaced with an acceleration statistic. Nearly half of the DS version's events are controlled with buttons, while other events are played with a stylus and touchscreen as usual like the previous installment.

All of the playable characters from the previous game return in addition to four new characters: Donkey Kong, Silver the Hedgehog, Bowser Jr. and Metal Sonic. It has been announced via the Nintendo Channel, that this game will have WiiConnect24 capability and, like its predecessor, the player can use their Miis in the Wii version in the game. A new feature added to the player's Mii is the ability to customize the Mii's clothes, which make small adjustments to a Mii's otherwise balanced stats.

The sequel introduces a Festival mode in the Wii version that allows the player to make their way through the entire Olympic Games, from opening ceremony to closure. The multiplayer mode offers "co-op and competitive gameplay" whereas the DS version will use its wireless capabilities. The DS counterpart has "Adventure Tours" where players can accept quests and challenge bosses and to stop Bowser and Dr. Eggman before they can stop the Olympics by kidnapping the Snow Spirits. DS Download Play is possible for those without an individual copy of the game.

== Development ==
In January 2009, a rumor from Spanish Nintendo magazine Nintendo Acción mentioned a sequel to Mario & Sonic at the Olympic Games would be created for the 2010 Winter Olympics. Both IGN and Eurogamer received confirmation on the games' existence, with IGN stating the game will be announced within the following month. Dennis Kim, licensing and merchandising director for the event, stated in February that a Mario & Sonic title "[is] being discussed and planned for Vancouver". Kim also stated "Vancouver 2010" and the IOC will share royalties from this game. In the same month, the sequel titled "Mario & Sonic at the Olympic Winter Games" was officially announced via a joint press release by Sega and Nintendo on February 12, 2009. The game was announced as being developed by Sega Japan under the supervision of Shigeru Miyamoto. This title is the third video game collaboration between Nintendo and Sega. According to gaming site IGN, development began immediately after the initial Olympic game was released in November 2007. In the months leading to the game's release, in which Nintendo unveiled and released the Wii MotionPlus accessory, Sega contemplated adding support for the accessory in the Wii version, but ultimately nixed it because the developers were not sure whether the Wii MotionPlus would be widely used. It was later incorporated into Mario & Sonic at the Sochi 2014 Olympic Winter Games for the Wii U.

An iPhone OS app version was released in January 2010 by Sega. Due to only containing Sonic characters, the game is simply titled Sonic at the Olympic Winter Games.

== Reception ==
Reception

Aggregate score
Aggregator	Score
GameRankings	70.95% (DS); 77.86% (Wii)

Review scores
Publication	Score
Eurogamer	8/10
GameSpot	(Wii) 6/10 (DS) 6/10
GamesRadar+	3.5/5
GameTrailers	7.2/10
IGN	(Wii) 6.4/10 (DS) 7.5/10
Nintendo Life	(Wii) 9/10 (DS) 8/10
Nintendo World Report	9/10
The Guardian	4/5
X-Play	3/5

The Wii version of Mario & Sonic at the Olympic Winter Games received a generally positive reaction from critics. The Wii version had a higher score than the DS version. GameRankings lists the average scores as 77.86% for the Wii version and 70.95% for the DS. IGN said of the Wii version that "Most of the events also use a whole lot of waggle or over-exaggerated controls where it could have made for a better experience", giving the Wii version a 6.5. X-Play's Adam Sessler asserted that the Wii version of the game is not that hard and the events interesting, but he claimed that the controls are too easy, despite praising the Dream Events. Accordingly, he gave it a 3 out of 5. GameSpot agreed, criticizing the uninteresting mission objectives in the DS version. Nintendo Power was very disappointed that players can still use Wi-Fi only for leaderboards, not for real-time online player versus player competition. GameTrailers also gave the Wii game a 5.2, criticizing the hit and miss motion controls. GamePro agreed, stating that "Where the original had a sense of novelty and charm, the sequel feels a little dated and tired."

GamesMaster praised the game, saying that it "justifies the hype." Eurogamer also praised the game, stating that "It's true to say that Mario & Sonic at the Olympic Winter Games is no Mario Kart. But it's a fun, polished party game with broad appeal, and a marked improvement over the previous one." Nintendo Life praised the events of the game, giving it a 9/10. IGN called the DS version "impressive", giving it a 7.5.

By December 31, 2009, the game had sold approximately 5.67 million copies, making it Sega's best-selling game in the fiscal year starting that March. As of March 2010, Sega sold 6.53 million copies in Europe and the United States.

== Sonic at the Olympic Winter Games ==
Sonic at the Olympic Winter Games
- Developer: Venan Entertainment
- Publisher: Sega
- Series: Sonic the Hedgehog
- Platform: iOS
- Release: January 30, 2010
- Genre: Sports
- Mode: Single-player

Sonic at the Olympic Winter Games (ソニック at バンクーバーオリンピック, Sonikku atto Bankūbā Orimpikku; lit. "Sonic at the Vancouver Olympics") is a sports game developed by Venan Entertainment and published by Sega for iOS. It was released on January 30, 2010, but has since been unexpectedly removed from the App Store with no comment by Sega or Apple. The game is officially licensed by the International Olympic Committee (IOC) through exclusive license International Sports Multimedia, and takes place at the 2010 Winter Olympics.

Sonic at the Olympic Winter Games follows the release of the similarly titled Mario & Sonic at the Olympic Winter Games with similar gameplay and setting, but with the absence of Nintendo-owned characters. In comparison, the game also features fewer events, fewer characters, and fewer modes. It received moderate reviews, exemplified by a five out of ten rating from IGN.
