= Luigi's Mansion =

2001 video game

- GameCube box art with Luigi and various ghosts
- Developer: Nintendo EAD (Note: Nintendo 3DS version developed by Grezzo)
- Publisher: Nintendo
- Directors: Hideki Konno; Katsumi Kuga (3DS)
- Producers: Shigeru Miyamoto; Takashi Tezuka; Kensuke Tanabe (3DS); Koichi Ishii (3DS)
- Programmer: Hiroki Sotoike
- Artist: Tadashi Sugiyama
- Composers: Kazumi Totaka; Shinobu Tanaka
- Series: Luigi's Mansion
- Platforms: GameCube; Nintendo 3DS
- Release: GameCube: JP: September 14, 2001; NA: November 18, 2001; EU: May 3, 2002; AU: May 17, 2002; Nintendo 3DS: NA: October 12, 2018; EU: October 19, 2018; AU: October 20, 2018; JP: November 8, 2018
- Genres: Action-adventure, comedy horror
- Mode: Single-player

Luigi's Mansion (Note: Japanese: ルイージマンション, Hepburn: Ruīji Manshon) is a 2001 action-adventure game developed and published by Nintendo. The game was a launch title for the GameCube and was the first game in the Mario franchise to be released for the console; it was released in Japan on September 14, 2001, in North America on November 18, 2001, in Europe on May 3, 2002, and in Australia on May 17, 2002. It is the third video game in which Luigi is the main character instead of Mario, after Mario Is Missing! and Luigi's Hammer Toss. Players control him as he explores a haunted mansion to rescue Mario and battles ghosts by capturing them through a vacuum cleaner supplied by Professor E. Gadd.

Luigi's Mansion received a positive critical reception overall, with reviewers praising the gameplay, visuals, setting, and soundtrack, though its short length was criticized. The game sold over 3.3 million copies, and is the fifth-best-selling GameCube game of all time. It was one of the first games to be re-released as a Player's Choice title on the system. Initial fan reception to the game was mixed; however, it improved over the years and achieved a cult following. The game was followed by two sequels – Luigi's Mansion: Dark Moon (2013) for the Nintendo 3DS, and Luigi's Mansion 3 (2019) for the Nintendo Switch. A remake of Luigi's Mansion for the 3DS, co-developed by Nintendo and Grezzo, was released in 2018. The game was re-released for Nintendo Switch 2 via the Nintendo Classics service in 2025.

== Gameplay ==
Pre-release screenshot of Luigi capturing Neville, the game's first "portrait ghost", using the Poltergust 3000. The number represents the ghost's HP, which must be reduced to zero for Luigi to capture it.

Luigi's Mansion's story takes place over four "areas", or sets of explorable rooms between boss fights. Players may also access a training room and a gallery at Professor E. Gadd's laboratory between areas or upon starting the game. In each area, players control Luigi to explore the mansion's rooms and hunt down the ghosts within them, acquiring keys to get through locked doors and eventually fighting a boss ghost at the end of the area. To assist him in his task, Luigi uses a flashlight and two devices supplied by E. Gadd – the Poltergust 3000, a specially modified, high-powered vacuum cleaner; and the Game Boy Horror, a mobile device designed after the Game Boy Color.

To capture ghosts, Luigi must first stun a ghost with his flashlight, revealing its heart. He then must use the Poltergust 3000 to suck them up, steadily reducing the ghost's hit points to zero, at which point they are captured. The more hit points the ghost has, the more time it takes for a ghost to be captured, giving them a chance to break free while leaving Luigi more exposed to harm. If Luigi's health is reduced to zero from being hurt by the ghosts or other accidents, the game is over. Along his journey, Luigi locates three elemental medals, each granting the Poltergust with the ability to summon and vacuum ghosts from fire, water, and ice sources and expel their respective elements to capture specific ghosts or solve puzzles. In addition to capturing the regular ghosts in the mansion, Luigi must catch "portrait ghosts" from some rooms, each requiring a condition be met to make them available for capture. Rooms are usually dark upon initial access, and Luigi hums nervously to the music, but once all the ghosts are captured, it brightens up, and Luigi pleasantly whistles the melody.

Using the Game Boy Horror's mobile phone-like functionality, players can access a map of the mansion, seeing which rooms they have visited, what doors are open, and which remain locked. When Luigi finds a key during his explorations, the Game Boy Horror automatically indicates which door it unlocks. In addition to a map function, the device allows the player to examine objects (including the hearts of portrait ghosts, revealing clues about how to capture them), read profiles of captured portrait ghosts, and keep track of any treasure that Luigi has found. Rooms will usually have treasure hidden within, which can be either coins, bills, gold bars, pearls, or gems. The treasures are typically hidden inside objects as well as chests that appear when rooms are cleared, though they can also be found from vacuuming ghosts. Luigi can gather these treasures by walking into them or vacuuming them; if a ghost harms Luigi, he will drop a few coins that he will need to recover before they disappear. After Luigi encounters a group of Boos hiding in the mansion, the Game Boy Horror can be used to find each one hiding in a room through a beeper sound and a flashing yellow light on the device, which turns red when Luigi is close to one. Boos can only be located in cleared rooms. Boos are trickier to catch, as they can plant decoys and traps within objects they can hide in that can fool the GB Horror and will escape into other rooms if they can.

Once an area is completed, all portrait ghosts are restored to their paintings by E. Gadd, which the player can view in his laboratory's gallery, at which point a result screen reveals the portrait ghosts Luigi has captured, along with the total amount of treasure he recovered for that stage. Once the final boss is defeated, the player is given a rank (A to H) after the end credits based on the amount of treasure Luigi has found. Completing the game once unlocks a second mode called the "Hidden Mansion", which features a stronger Poltergust and stronger ghosts. In the European and Australian version of this mode, the mansion appears as a mirrored reflection of the previous version, bosses are more difficult, ghosts and Portrait Ghosts are trickier to capture, and more ghosts appear in some of the rooms. Most of these Hidden Mansion differences were later added to the Nintendo 3DS remake of the game in all versions, although the stronger Poltergust and mirrored mansion were removed.

== Plot ==
Luigi is notified about winning a mansion in a mail-in contest he never entered. He informs Mario and they agree to meet up there that evening. Luigi follows a map to the mansion, located in a dark forest, and finds it more sinister-looking than the supplied photo. With Mario nowhere to be seen, Luigi enters the mansion alone. He encounters a ghost, which lunges at him, but is unexpectedly saved by a diminutive and elderly scientist who unsuccessfully tries to deter the ghost with a vacuum cleaner and introduces himself as Professor Elvin Gadd, or E. Gadd for short. They escape as more ghosts appear. In his laboratory, E. Gadd explains the mansion is supernatural in origin and only appeared a few days prior. E. Gadd tells Luigi that he saw Mario heading towards the mansion, but has not seen him since. Upon learning that Mario is Luigi's brother, E. Gadd entrusts Luigi with his ghost-hunting equipment, the Poltergust 3000 vacuum cleaner and Game Boy Horror communication device, as Luigi re-enters the mansion to find Mario.

As Luigi explores the mansion, he discovers that it was created by King Boo to shelter the now-freed special ghosts that E. Gadd had previously captured and turned into paintings with a large machine dubbed the "Ghost Portrificationizer"; King Boo subsequently sent the false notification of Luigi winning the mansion to lure the Mario Bros. into a trap in retaliation for the Boos they defeated in the past. Working his way through each of the darkened floors, halls, and locked rooms, Luigi recaptures the escaped ghosts and discovers that Mario has been trapped inside of a painting by King Boo and held captive in a secret ritualistic altar in the mansion's basement. While recapturing the last of the ghosts, Luigi finds the key that unlocks the altar's entrance and confronts King Boo, who, now disdainful over Luigi capturing his minions, pulls Luigi into the painting. Using his illusionary powers within a pocket dimension inside it, King Boo creates a suit-like replica of Bowser to combat Luigi. Luigi uses the mines that the replica throws to force King Boo out of it and capture him. Returned to the real world in the aftermath, Luigi finds Mario unconscious but still trapped within the painting, which he triumphantly carries out of the mansion. Returning to E. Gadd's laboratory, he informs Luigi that the mansion has ceased to exist, due to it being an illusion, as they turn King Boo into a painting along with the last of the recaptured ghosts. Using the Ghost Portrificationizer's reverse function, Luigi frees Mario from his painting. In an epilogue, as a sign of gratitude towards Luigi for all his help, E. Gadd has a new non-haunted house for him built on the former site of the mansion, with its size determined by the amount of treasure collected during the game.

== Development ==
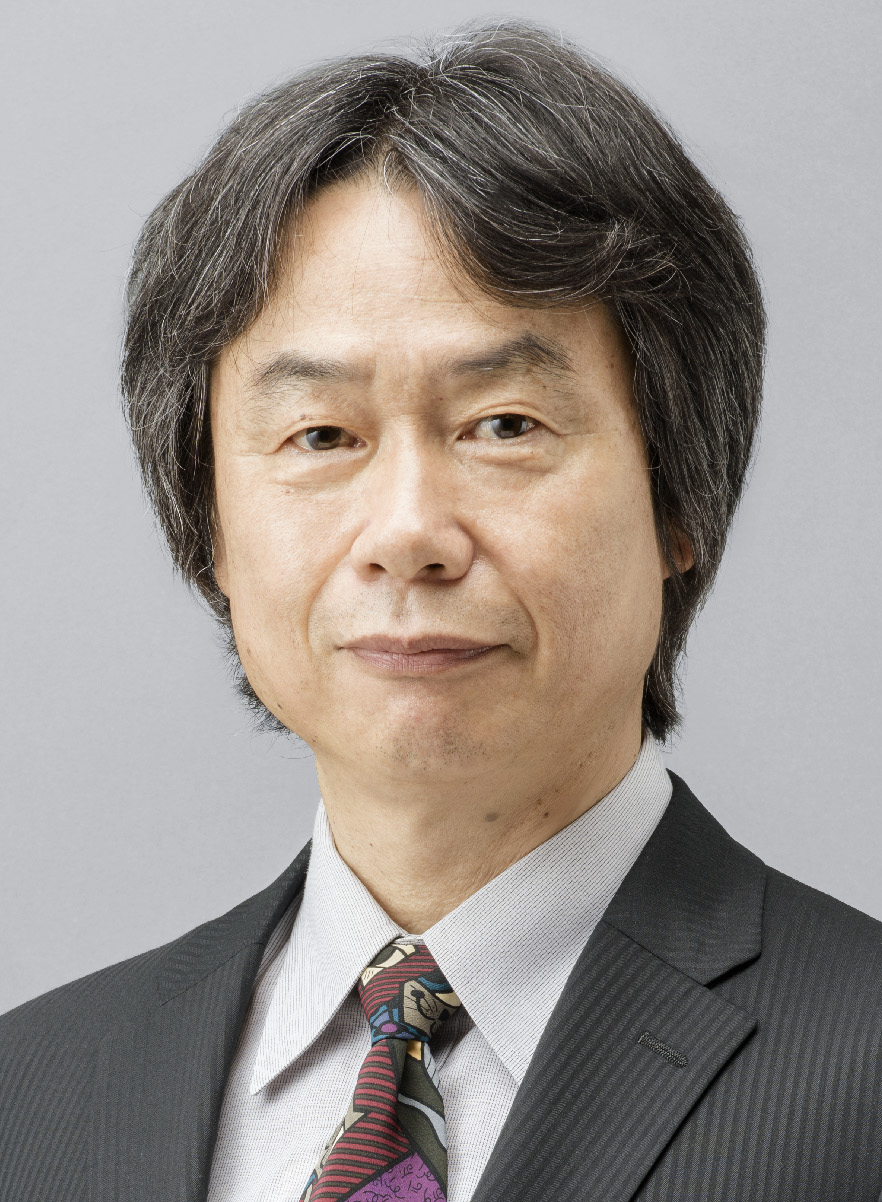
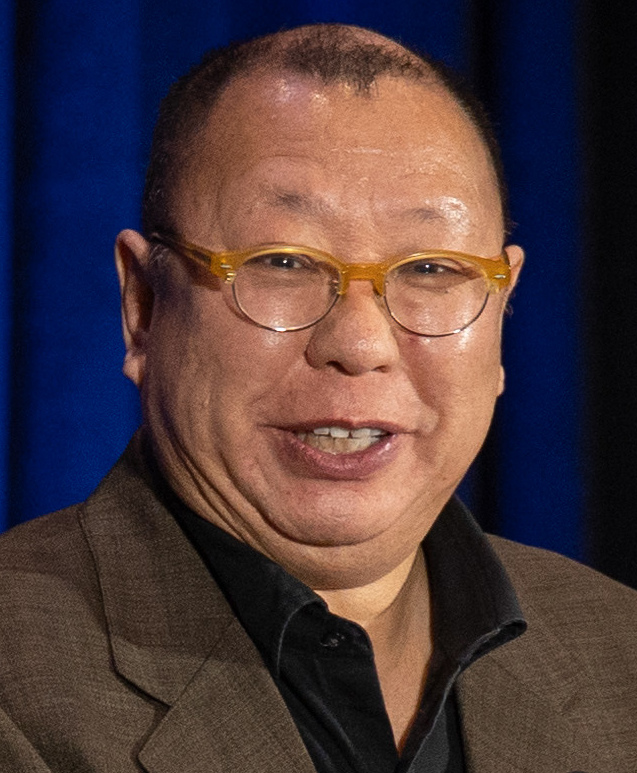
Producers Shigeru Miyamoto (left, pictured in 2015) and Takashi Tezuka (right, pictured in 2024)

The game was revealed at Nintendo Space World 2000 as a technological demo designed to show off the graphical capabilities of the GameCube. The full motion video footage had scenes seen in later trailers and commercials for the game, but were not used in the final release. This footage includes Luigi screaming in horror at the camera, running from an unknown ghost in the Foyer, ghosts playing cards in the Parlor, ghosts circling around Luigi, and a gloomy-looking Luigi standing outside the mansion with lightning flashing. These were animated at three graphic houses to pay homage to the GameCube. Soon after its creation, Nintendo decided to transform the demo into a full-fledged video game. A year later, Luigi's Mansion was shown at the Electronic Entertainment Expo alongside the GameCube console. Development was led by Hideki Konno, Shigeru Miyamoto, and Takashi Tezuka. A newer version of the game, more closely related to the final version, was revealed at Nintendo Space World 2001.

The original plan for Luigi's Mansion involved a game where the levels revolved around a large mansion or apartment complex. Beta tests were done with Mario characters in dollhouses and other buildings. As the lighting scheme was developed, darkness and shadows became key areas of focus, and an older American-styled haunted house was ultimately chosen as the setting. Once it was transitioned into a GameCube project, Luigi was selected as the main character to keep the game original and new. The other gameplay ideas, such as ghosts and the ghost-sucking vacuum cleaner, were added later. Older concepts, such as a role-playing game-like system which made real-time changes to rooms, as well as a cave area located under the mansion, were scrapped due to the inclusion of the new ideas. Konno explained that while basic gameplay involving the vacuum cleaner would have been possible on the Nintendo 64, the enhanced power of the GameCube enabled the use of advanced lighting, shadows, and character animations, which became important aspects of the game.

Luigi's Mansion's music was composed by Shinobu Tanaka and Kazumi Totaka, and as such contains "Totaka's Song", a song featured in almost every game that Totaka has composed. It is found by waiting on the controller configuration screen at the Training Room for about three and a half minutes. The main theme of Luigi's Mansion was orchestrated and arranged by Shogo Sakai for Super Smash Bros. Brawl. The game featured voice actors Charles Martinet as the voice of Mario and Luigi, Jen Taylor as the voice of Toad, and an uncredited Totaka as the voice of E. Gadd.

All GameCube systems support the display of stereoscopic 3D, and Luigi's Mansion was planned to utilize this feature; however, 3D televisions were not widespread at the time, and it was deemed that compatible displays would be too cost-prohibitive for the consumer. As a result, the feature was not enabled outside of development. Stereoscopic 3D effects were later included in the 2018 remake of the game for Nintendo 3DS.

== Reception ==
Luigi's Mansion

Aggregate scores
Aggregator	Score	
Aggregator	3DS	GameCube
Metacritic	74/100	78/100
OpenCritic	54% recommend	N/A

Review scores
Publication	Score	
Publication	3DS	GameCube
4Players	80/100	N/A
AllGame	N/A	3.5/5
Destructoid	7.5/10	N/A
Edge	N/A	8/10
Electronic Gaming Monthly	N/A	7.5/10
Eurogamer	N/A	7/10
Famitsu	8/10, 8/10, 8/10, 8/10	9/10, 9/10, 8/10, 8/10
G4	N/A	4/5
Game Informer	N/A	9/10
GamePro	N/A	4.5/5
GameRevolution	N/A	B
GameSpot	7/10	7.9/10
GameSpy	N/A	75/100
Hardcore Gamer	4/5	N/A
IGN	7/10	7/10
Jeuxvideo.com	14/20	N/A
Next Generation	N/A	4/5
NGC Magazine	N/A	90/100
Nintendo Life	8/10	8/10
Nintendo Power	N/A	4/5
Nintendo World Report	7/10	N/A
Pocket Gamer	3.5/5	N/A
Shacknews	8/10	N/A

Commercially, Luigi's Mansion is the most successful GameCube launch title and the best-selling game of November 2001. It sold 257,000 units during its first week on sale in the United States. According to Nintendo, the game was a large driving force behind the GameCube's launch sales and sold more copies in its opening week than Super Mario 64 had managed to sell. Despite meager sales in Japan at around 348,000 units in total, it became the fifth best-selling GameCube game in the United States, with sales of roughly 2.19 million units. In total it sold 3.33 million copies worldwide by 2020. (Note: Luigi's Mansion sales breakdown: Japan – 348,918; United Kingdom – 100,000; United States – 2.19 million) It was also one of the first Player's Choice titles on the console, along with Super Smash Bros. Melee and Pikmin.

Critically, Luigi's Mansion was positively received, with reviewers praising the game's graphics, design, and gameplay. GameSpot stated that Luigi's Mansion "features some refreshing ideas" and "flashes of brilliance". The gaming magazine Nintendo Power praised the game for being "very enjoyable while it lasts, with its clever puzzles and innovative game play." GameSpy said that the game features "great visuals, imaginative game design and some classic Nintendo magic." The game was referred to as "a masterful example of game design" by GamePro. GameRevolution stated that "the graphics are quite beautiful and the interesting game mechanics are enjoyable". The American-based publication Game Informer praised the gameplay, and referred to it as "brilliant and up to par with Miyamoto's best". The audio was praised by IGN, who considered Luigi's voice acting as "cute, humorous and satisfying", and GameSpy, who declared that the soundtrack remains "subtle, amusing and totally suitable throughout the game". The Japanese video game publication Famitsu awarded the game with a gold rating, and noted that the control system, while tricky at first, works well.

The game has also received criticism, mainly because of its length. GameSpot said that Luigi's Mansion "fails to match the classic status of Mario's adventures" and that the "short amount of time it takes to complete it makes it a hard recommendation". The review, however, also considered that the short length prevents the gameplay and audio from getting tiresome. GameSpot later named Luigi's Mansion the most disappointing game of 2001. GameSpy also criticized the game's length, saying that it could be beaten in about six hours. Allgame declared that Luigi's Mansion "ultimately fails to deliver a cohesive gameplay experience over the long-term". Fran Mirabella III of IGN felt that the game was sub-par, due to its "predictable, formulaic gameplay". G4's TV show X-Play criticized Luigi's Mansion in their special on Mario games and media, calling the game a letdown for players waiting for the first Mario game on the GameCube. Luigi's Mansion was awarded the 2002 BAFTA Interactive Entertainment Award for audio. The game placed 99th in Official Nintendo Magazine's 100 greatest Nintendo games of all time.

== Legacy ==
The Luigi's Mansion stage, as it appears in Super Smash Bros. for Wii U

Luigi's Mansion introduces two characters, Professor Elvin Gadd, or E. Gadd for short, and King Boo. E. Gadd has reappeared in other Mario games, such as Mario Party 6 and Mario & Luigi: Partners in Time. E. Gadd is referenced in Super Mario Sunshine as the creator of Mario's F.L.U.D.D. device and Bowser Jr.'s paintbrush. He also appears as a playable character skin in Super Mario Maker. King Boo has also reappeared in other games, either as a boss (including Super Mario 64 DS and Super Mario Sunshine) or a playable character (including Mario Kart: Double Dash and Mario Super Sluggers).

The mansion in the game has reappeared in other Mario games, usually acting as Luigi's home stage. It appeared in Mario Kart: Double Dash!!, Mario Kart DS, Mario Kart 7, Mario Kart 8 (Deluxe), Mario Power Tennis, Mario Super Sluggers, Mario Hoops 3-on-3, Mario Sports Mix, Super Smash Bros. Brawl, Super Smash Bros. for Wii U and Super Smash Bros. Ultimate. The Wii U launch title Nintendo Land features Luigi's Ghost Mansion, a multiplayer minigame based on Luigi's Mansion. In this minigame, four players controlling Miis dressed up as Mario, Luigi, Wario and Waluigi have to drain the energy of a ghost, while the GamePad player, controlling the ghost, must make all the other players faint before time runs out.

A direct sequel for the Nintendo 3DS, Luigi's Mansion: Dark Moon, was released in March 2013, almost twelve years after the release of Luigi's Mansion, to celebrate the Year of Luigi. In 2015, Nintendo released Luigi's Mansion Arcade, an arcade game based on Luigi's Mansion: Dark Moon developed by Capcom and published by Sega. The game uses the same plot as Dark Moon, but goes for a first-person, on-rails gameplay style, and utilizes a special vacuum-based controller. The game is mostly found in Japanese arcades, although some cabinets have been localized and released at select Dave & Buster's locations in the United States. A third installment, titled Luigi's Mansion 3, was released for the Nintendo Switch on October 31, 2019.

=== 3DS remake ===
A remake of Luigi's Mansion for the Nintendo 3DS, co-developed by Nintendo and Grezzo, was announced on March 8, 2018, and released on October 12, 2018.

Several years prior to the remake's official announcement as a commercial project, Shigeru Miyamoto designed a working prototype of the game running on a 3DS development kit to test the system's hardware and 3D functionality, which ultimately led to the development of Luigi's Mansion: Dark Moon. The remake has amiibo functionality and supports gyroscopic controls, the Circle Pad Pro accessory, the C-Stick on New Nintendo 3DS models, and stereoscopic 3D. Four other new features were added as new content: local cooperative play in which a second player takes on the role of a doppelgänger named "Gooigi", a new control option that allows the use of the Strobulb flashlight from Dark Moon, an achievement list, and a boss rush mode where up to two players can attempt to clear boss fights as fast as possible. All regional releases of the remake also incorporate elements from the PAL version's Hidden Mansion, increasing the difficulty of the second quest in the North American and Japanese versions. If the player scores high enough in the Hidden Mansion, they will achieve Rank S, one level higher than A, and be shown an even more luxurious version of Luigi's new mansion after the credits. As of 2018, it has sold 90,410 copies in Japan, making it the third best-selling Nintendo 3DS release of 2018 behind WarioWare Gold and Detective Pikachu. Critical reception to the remake was generally positive; reviewers appreciated the effort put into the revamped visuals and many believe the core experience to largely hold up 17 years after the original release. Outlets also spoke positively about the implementation of stereoscopic 3D and the two screens as well as the new content such as the boss rush mode and the PAL Hidden Mansion.
