= List of Mario educational games =

The popularity of the Super Mario series led to the release of several spin-off Mario educational games from 1988 to 1996. Nintendo had little involvement in the development of these games; they were created by various other developers, including The Software Toolworks and Interplay Entertainment. Some of the titles were released exclusively for either the Nintendo Entertainment System (NES), the Super NES (SNES), or for personal computers, while others were released on two or more of those platforms. The Mario educational games were generally designed for use by children in preschool or kindergarten and focused on developing skills ranging from language and typing to geography and history. The educational games were not well-received, with many critics and gamers labeling them as some of the worst Mario games ever made. Many of them have spawned Internet memes.

== I Am a Teacher: Super Mario Sweater ==
I Am a Teacher: Super Mario Sweater (アイアムアティーチャースーパーマリオのセーター, Ai amu a Tīchā: Sūpā Mario no Sētā) is Famicom Disk System software released in 1986 only in Japan. It was designed by Royal Industries Co., Ltd., a Japanese appliance and sewing machine company. The program displays a knitting pattern after taking in the user's measurements and displays the amount of yarn needed to create a sweater. The user can pick between various designs, some including various Super Mario characters such as Luigi, Mario, and Peach. Using the program, players could also choose their design and have the company make it for a small fee.

== Mario Discovery Series ==
The "Mario Discovery Series" is a label given to five Mario educational games that were developed by The Software Toolworks.

=== Mario Is Missing! ===
Mario Is Missing! is a geography-based game released in 1993 for the PC, Macintosh, Super NES and NES. The NES version was developed by Radical Entertainment, while the other versions were developed by The Software Toolworks.

In the game, Bowser sets up a castle in Antarctica, and plans to use hair dryers to melt the continent's ice and flood Earth. He sends Koopas to cities across Earth to steal artifacts to fund his operation. Mario, Luigi and Yoshi travel to Bowser's castle to stop him. Mario is kidnapped by Bowser, prompting Luigi to rescue him. Luigi progresses through the game by completing levels in Bowser's castle; each floor is guarded by one Koopaling and contains a number of pipes which transport Luigi to a city containing Koopas. Once a floor is completed, Luigi must defeat the Koopaling guarding that floor to go ahead to the next. The main gameplay consists of moving around a city in side-scrolling manner while jumping on Koopas to collect stolen artifacts (pieces of famous landmarks). Luigi then must "secure" the city by taking these artifacts to their respective locations and correctly answering two questions about the landmark. Once an artifact is returned, the landmark is reopened.

Mario Is Missing! is the first Mario game to feature only Luigi as the starring character, which did not occur again until Luigi's Mansion, a game released for the Nintendo GameCube in 2001.

=== Mario's Time Machine ===
Mario's Time Machine was originally released on MS-DOS, and was later released on the NES and Super NES. The MS-DOS version was re-released as Mario's Time Machine Deluxe in 1996. In the game, Bowser steals artifacts from various points in history using a time machine and Mario must return them back. Mario Is Missing! and Mario's Time Machine were generally poorly received.

=== Mario's Early Years! games ===
The Mario's Early Years! games were released for the Super NES and computers. The three games were Mario's Early Years! Fun with Letters, Mario's Early Years! Fun with Numbers, and Mario's Early Years! Preschool Fun. The games were released in September, October, and November 1994, respectively, and all support the Super NES Mouse peripheral. The games contain Mario, Princess Peach and Yoshi on a wooden boat traveling from island to island, learning about various subjects. All three games use the same game engine.

== Mario Teaches Typing games ==
Mario Teaches Typing was released on personal computers and was designed to teach typing skills to children. The game was developed and published by Interplay Productions. It was first released for MS-DOS in 1992, followed by versions for Microsoft Windows and Macintosh in 1995. In the floppy disk version, Mario is voiced by Ronald B. Ruben, while the CD-ROM version features Charles Martinet as the voice of Mario. According to Brian Fargo, then director at Interplay Productions, the concept for the game was inspired by the success of educational software like Mavis Beacon Teaches Typing. Fargo proposed to Nintendo that Mario be used as the instructor for the lessons, and the idea was approved.

The game allows players to choose from three characters: Mario, Luigi, and Peach. It displays a pair of hands on screen to guide finger placement—for instance, highlighting the left pinky finger when typing the letter "A". If a player presses the wrong key, the cursor does not move forward until the correct key is entered. Once the timer runs out, the session ends and a summary screen appears, showing performance statistics such as words per minute.

The game features a series of progressively difficult lessons, with Mario's on-screen progress reflecting the player's typing. Upon completing all the lessons, players receive a certificate of completion. Critics noted that the game's approach made learning to type engaging for children, particularly due to Mario's familiar and entertaining presence.

A sequel, Mario Teaches Typing 2, was developed by Brainstorm and published by Interplay in 1997. In this version, Charles Martinet is the sole voice actor for Mario. The sequel introduced several new features, including a customisable achievement certificate, an on-screen colour-coded keyboard, personalised lesson plans, and an animated Mario head that interacts with the player. Some critics praised the improved graphics and lesson customisation, though others noted that certain elements—like Mario's on-screen actions—could be distracting for younger players. Additionally, some felt that as a Nintendo-branded product, it might not appeal as strongly to those unfamiliar with the franchise.

The CD-ROM versions of Mario Teaches Typing and Mario Teaches Typing 2 include a storyline in which Mario and Luigi encounter a magical typewriter. When Mario mistypes a phrase intended to destroy Bowser's Castle, the typewriter explodes into three pieces. As the player progresses through the lessons, they recover the scattered parts of the typewriter. Once it is fully repaired, Mario is able to type the phrase correctly, leading to the destruction of Bowser's Castle.

== Mario's Game Gallery ==
Mario's Game Gallery is a compilation of games released for PC in 1995. It was published by Interplay Productions and developed by Page Software. In 1998, it was reissued as Mario's FUNdamentals for Macintosh (published by Stepping Stone) and for Windows (published by Mindscape), with development by Brainstorm Entertainment.

Mario's Game Gallery features five traditional games which play very similarly to their real world counterparts but with Mario themes. The player faces off against Mario in these games. Mario's Game Gallery was the first game in the Mario franchise to feature Charles Martinet as the voice of Mario, and he has continued to voice the character in all subsequent Mario games. While the game and its re-release Mario's FUNdamentals have been praised by some, others consider it to be one of the worst games to feature Mario.

Since its release, both Mario's Game Gallery and Mario's FUNdamentals have received mixed reviews. The State praised the game for "providing fun for the whole family," calling the included games "excellent". The Miami Herald also appreciated the "sharp" graphics, "fun" animations, and music based on the Mario franchise, describing the game as "fun for the whole family." However, they criticised its occasional difficulty and recommended it to users who had recently purchased a PC and wanted an easy-to-install "product for the new CD-ROM." The Los Angeles Times included it in an educational video game article that would appeal to younger players.

On the other hand, authors David Wesley and Gloria Barczak cited Mario's Game Gallery as part of a "flood of ill-conceived Mario concepts," claiming that these games nearly led to the series' downfall. Tom East of Official Nintendo Magazine included it as part of his article "Rare Mario Games", and commented that, although Mario's Game Gallery was Martinet's first job as Mario, most identify Super Mario 64 as his first role. Additionally, ScrewAttack ranked it as the sixth worst Mario game of all time, concluding that there was "nothing fun" about Mario's FUNdamentals.

== Super Mario Bros. & Friends: When I Grow Up ==
Super Mario Bros. & Friends: When I Grow Up is a children's computer coloring game featuring Mario and Luigi. It was released in 1991 for MS-DOS. Players can paint Mario and other Nintendo characters.
