= List of Nintendo hybrid console video games =

Nintendo is a Japanese multinational video game company headquartered in Kyoto. It develops, publishes, and manufactures both video games and video game consoles. Since Nintendo's entrance into the video game industry in 1977, they have consistently made video games for both home consoles and handheld systems. However, with the introduction of the Nintendo Switch in 2017, they have shifted to producing most of their video games for hybrid systems.

== Nintendo Switch ==
Licenses owned or co-owned by Nintendo
Title	Developer(s)	Release date			Ref.
Title	Developer(s)	JP	NA	PAL	Ref.
The Legend of Zelda: Breath of the Wild	Nintendo EPD	March 3, 2017	March 3, 2017	March 3, 2017	
1-2-Switch	Nintendo EPD	March 3, 2017	March 3, 2017	March 3, 2017	
Mario Kart 8 Deluxe	Nintendo EPD	April 28, 2017	April 28, 2017	April 28, 2017	
Arms	Nintendo EPD	June 16, 2017	June 16, 2017	June 16, 2017	
Splatoon 2	Nintendo EPD	July 21, 2017	July 21, 2017	July 21, 2017	
Mario + Rabbids Kingdom Battle (Note: Published by Nintendo only in Japan.)	Ubisoft Paris; Ubisoft Milan	January 18, 2018	August 29, 2017	August 29, 2017	
Pokkén Tournament DX (Note: Published by The Pokémon Company in Japan.)	Bandai Namco Studios	September 22, 2017	September 22, 2017	September 22, 2017	
Fire Emblem Warriors (Note: Published by Nintendo outside Japan.)	Omega Force; Team Ninja	September 28, 2017	October 20, 2017	October 20, 2017	
Super Mario Odyssey	Nintendo EPD	October 27, 2017	October 27, 2017	October 27, 2017	
Snipperclips Plus	SFB Games	November 10, 2017	November 10, 2017	November 10, 2017	
Xenoblade Chronicles 2	Monolith Soft	December 1, 2017	December 1, 2017	December 1, 2017	
Bayonetta	PlatinumGames	February 17, 2018	September 30, 2022 (Note: A downloadable version was released on February 17, 2018.)	October 25, 2022	
Bayonetta 2	PlatinumGames	February 17, 2018	February 16, 2018	February 16, 2018	
Kirby Star Allies	HAL Laboratory	March 16, 2018	March 16, 2018	March 16, 2018	
Hyrule Warriors: Definitive Edition	Omega Force; Team Ninja	March 22, 2018	May 18, 2018	May 18, 2018	
Nintendo Labo: Toy-Con 01 - Variety Kit	Nintendo EPD	April 20, 2018	April 20, 2018	April 27, 2018	
Nintendo Labo: Toy-Con 02 - Robot Kit	Nintendo EPD	April 20, 2018	April 20, 2018	April 27, 2018	
Donkey Kong Country: Tropical Freeze	Retro Studios	May 3, 2018	May 4, 2018	May 4, 2018	
Sushi Striker: The Way of Sushido	Indieszero	June 8, 2018	June 8, 2018	June 8, 2018	
Mario Tennis Aces	Camelot Software Planning	June 22, 2018	June 22, 2018	June 22, 2018	
Captain Toad: Treasure Tracker	Nintendo EPD; Nintendo Software Technology	July 13, 2018	July 13, 2018	July 13, 2018	
Go Vacation	Bandai Namco Studios Shade	July 27, 2018	July 27, 2018	July 27, 2018	
Nintendo Labo: Toy-Con 03 - Vehicle Kit	Nintendo EPD	September 14, 2018	September 14, 2018	September 14, 2018	
Xenoblade Chronicles 2: Torna – The Golden Country	Monolith Soft	September 21, 2018	September 21, 2018	September 21, 2018	
Super Mario Party	NDcube	October 5, 2018	October 5, 2018	October 5, 2018	
Pokémon: Let's Go, Pikachu! and Let's Go, Eevee!	Game Freak	November 16, 2018	November 16, 2018	November 16, 2018	
Super Smash Bros. Ultimate	Bandai Namco Studios; Sora Ltd.	December 7, 2018	December 7, 2018	December 7, 2018	
New Super Mario Bros. U Deluxe	Nintendo EPD	January 11, 2019	January 11, 2019	January 11, 2019	
Yoshi's Crafted World	Good-Feel	March 29, 2019	March 29, 2019	March 29, 2019	
Nintendo Labo: Toy-Con 04 - VR Kit	Nintendo EPD	April 12, 2019	April 12, 2019	April 12, 2019	
Super Mario Maker 2	Nintendo EPD	June 28, 2019	June 28, 2019	June 28, 2019	
Marvel Ultimate Alliance 3: The Black Order	Team Ninja	July 19, 2019	July 19, 2019	July 19, 2019	
Fire Emblem: Three Houses	Intelligent Systems Koei Tecmo Games	July 26, 2019	July 26, 2019	July 26, 2019	
Tetris 99 (Note: A downloadable version was released on February 13, 2019.)	Arika	August 9, 2019	September 6, 2019	September 20, 2019	
Astral Chain	PlatinumGames	August 30, 2019	August 30, 2019	August 30, 2019	
The Legend of Zelda: Link's Awakening	Grezzo	September 20, 2019	September 20, 2019	September 20, 2019	
Ring Fit Adventure	Nintendo EPD	October 18, 2019	October 18, 2019	October 18, 2019	
Luigi's Mansion 3	Next Level Games	October 31, 2019	October 31, 2019	October 31, 2019	
Pokémon Sword and Shield	Game Freak	November 15, 2019	November 15, 2019	November 15, 2019	
Dr Kawashima's Brain Training for Nintendo Switch	Nintendo EPD indieszero	December 27, 2019	Unreleased	January 3, 2020	
Tokyo Mirage Sessions ♯FE Encore	Atlus	January 17, 2020	January 17, 2020	January 17, 2020	
Pokémon Mystery Dungeon: Rescue Team DX	Spike Chunsoft	March 6, 2020	March 6, 2020	March 6, 2020	
Animal Crossing: New Horizons	Nintendo EPD	March 20, 2020	March 20, 2020	March 20, 2020	
Xenoblade Chronicles: Definitive Edition	Monolith Soft	May 29, 2020	May 29, 2020	May 29, 2020	
Clubhouse Games: 51 Worldwide Classics	NDcube	June 5, 2020	June 5, 2020	June 5, 2020	
Paper Mario: The Origami King	Intelligent Systems	July 17, 2020	July 17, 2020	July 17, 2020	
Super Mario 3D All-Stars	Nintendo EPD	September 18, 2020	September 18, 2020	September 18, 2020	
Cadence of Hyrule - Crypt of the NecroDancer Featuring The Legend of Zelda (Note: A downloadable version was released on June 13, 2019.)	Brace Yourself Games	October 23, 2020	October 23, 2020	October 23, 2020	
Pikmin 3 Deluxe	Nintendo EPD; Eighting	October 30, 2020	October 30, 2020	October 30, 2020	
Hyrule Warriors: Age of Calamity	Omega Force	November 20, 2020	November 20, 2020	November 20, 2020	
Buddy Mission Bond	Koei Tecmo	January 29, 2021	Unreleased	Unreleased	
Super Mario 3D World + Bowser's Fury	Nintendo EPD; Nintendo Software Technology	February 12, 2021	February 12, 2021	February 12, 2021	
New Pokémon Snap	Bandai Namco Studios	April 30, 2021	April 30, 2021	April 30, 2021	
Famicom Detective Club: The Two-Case Collection	Mages	May 14, 2021	Unreleased (Note: A downloadable version was released on May 14, 2021.)	Unreleased	
Miitopia	Grezzo	May 21, 2021	May 21, 2021	May 21, 2021	
DC Super Hero Girls: Teen Power	Toybox	June 4, 2021	June 4, 2021	June 4, 2021	
Game Builder Garage	Nintendo EPD	June 11, 2021	June 11, 2021	June 11, 2021	
Mario Golf: Super Rush	Camelot Software Planning	June 25, 2021	June 25, 2021	June 25, 2021	
The Legend of Zelda: Skyward Sword HD	Tantalus	July 16, 2021	July 16, 2021	July 16, 2021	
WarioWare: Get It Together!	Intelligent Systems	September 10, 2021	September 10, 2021	September 10, 2021	
Metroid Dread	MercurySteam; Nintendo EPD	October 8, 2021	October 8, 2021	October 8, 2021	
Mario Party Superstars	NDcube	October 29, 2021	October 29, 2021	October 29, 2021	
Pokémon Brilliant Diamond and Shining Pearl	ILCA	November 19, 2021	November 19, 2021	November 19, 2021	
Big Brain Academy: Brain vs. Brain	Nintendo EPD indieszero	December 3, 2021	December 3, 2021	December 3, 2021	
Pokémon Legends: Arceus	Game Freak	January 28, 2022	January 28, 2022	January 28, 2022	
Kirby and the Forgotten Land	HAL Laboratory	March 25, 2022	March 25, 2022	March 25, 2022	
Nintendo Switch Sports	Nintendo EPD	April 29, 2022	April 29, 2022	April 29, 2022	
Mario Strikers: Battle League	Next Level Games	June 10, 2022	June 10, 2022	June 10, 2022	
Fire Emblem Warriors: Three Hopes	Omega Force	June 24, 2022	June 24, 2022	June 24, 2022	
Xenoblade Chronicles 3	Monolith Soft	July 29, 2022	July 29, 2022	July 29, 2022	
Splatoon 3	Nintendo EPD	September 9, 2022	September 9, 2022	September 9, 2022	
Mario + Rabbids Sparks of Hope	Ubisoft Milan; Ubisoft Paris	December 2, 2022	October 20, 2022	October 20, 2022	
Bayonetta 3	PlatinumGames	October 28, 2022	October 28, 2022	October 28, 2022	
Pokémon Scarlet and Violet	Game Freak	November 18, 2022	November 18, 2022	November 18, 2022	
Fire Emblem Engage	Intelligent Systems	January 20, 2023	January 20, 2023	January 20, 2023	
Metroid Prime Remastered (Note: A downloadable version was released on February 8, 2023.)	Retro Studios	March 3, 2023	February 22, 2023	March 3, 2023	
Kirby's Return to Dream Land Deluxe	HAL Laboratory Vanpool	February 24, 2023	February 24, 2023	February 24, 2023	
Bayonetta Origins: Cereza and the Lost Demon	PlatinumGames	March 17, 2023	March 17, 2023	March 17, 2023	
Advance Wars 1+2: Re-Boot Camp	WayForward	Unreleased	April 21, 2023	April 21, 2023	
The Legend of Zelda: Tears of the Kingdom	Nintendo EPD	May 12, 2023	May 12, 2023	May 12, 2023	
Everybody 1-2-Switch!	Nintendo EPD NDcube	June 30, 2023	June 30, 2023	June 30, 2023	
Pikmin 4	Nintendo EPD; Eighting	July 21, 2023	July 21, 2023	July 21, 2023	
Pikmin 1+2 (Note: A downloadable version was released on June 21, 2023.)	Nintendo European Research & Development	September 22, 2023	September 22, 2023	September 22, 2023	
Detective Pikachu Returns	Creatures Inc.	October 6, 2023	October 6, 2023	October 6, 2023	
Super Mario Bros. Wonder	Nintendo EPD	October 20, 2023	October 20, 2023	October 20, 2023	
WarioWare: Move It!	Intelligent Systems	November 3, 2023	November 3, 2023	November 3, 2023	
Super Mario RPG	ArtePiazza	November 17, 2023	November 17, 2023	November 17, 2023	
Another Code: Recollection	Arc System Works	January 19, 2024	January 19, 2024	January 19, 2024	
Mario vs. Donkey Kong	Nintendo Software Technology	February 16, 2024	February 16, 2024	February 16, 2024	
Princess Peach: Showtime!	Good-Feel	March 22, 2024	March 22, 2024	March 22, 2024	
Endless Ocean Luminous	Arika	May 2, 2024	May 2, 2024	May 2, 2024	
Paper Mario: The Thousand-Year Door	Intelligent Systems	May 23, 2024	May 23, 2024	May 23, 2024	
Luigi's Mansion 2 HD	Tantalus Media	June 27, 2024	June 27, 2024	June 27, 2024	
Nintendo World Championships: NES Edition	Nintendo EPD; indieszero	July 18, 2024	July 18, 2024	July 18, 2024	
Emio – The Smiling Man: Famicom Detective Club	Nintendo EPD; Mages	August 29, 2024	August 29, 2024	August 29, 2024	
The Legend of Zelda: Echoes of Wisdom	Nintendo EPD; Grezzo	September 26, 2024	September 26, 2024	September 26, 2024	
Super Mario Party Jamboree	Nintendo Cube	October 17, 2024	October 17, 2024	October 17, 2024	
Mario & Luigi: Brothership	Acquire	November 7, 2024	November 7, 2024	November 7, 2024	
Donkey Kong Country Returns HD	Forever Entertainment	January 16, 2025	January 16, 2025	January 16, 2025	
Xenoblade Chronicles X: Definitive Edition	Monolith Soft	March 20, 2025	March 20, 2025	March 20, 2025	
Super Mario Galaxy + Super Mario Galaxy 2	Nintendo EPD Nintendo Software Technology	October 2, 2025	October 2, 2025	October 2, 2025	
Pokémon Legends: Z-A	Game Freak	October 16, 2025	October 16, 2025	October 16, 2025	
Metroid Prime 4: Beyond	Retro Studios	December 4, 2025	December 4, 2025	December 4, 2025	
Tomodachi Life: Living the Dream	Nintendo EPD	April 16, 2026	April 16, 2026	April 16, 2026	
Rhythm Heaven Groove	Nintendo EPD, TNX Music Recordings	July 2, 2026	July 2, 2026	July 2, 2026	

Licensed to Nintendo (original release published by another company)
North America and PAL regions only
Title	Licensor(s)	Release date		Ref.
Title	Licensor(s)	NA	PAL	Ref.
Dragon Quest Builders	Square Enix	February 9, 2018		
Octopath Traveler	Square Enix	July 13, 2018		
The World Ends with You: Final Remix	Square Enix	October 12, 2018		
Fitness Boxing	Imagineer	January 4, 2019	December 21, 2018	
Dragon Quest Builders 2	Square Enix	July 12, 2019		
Daemon X Machina	Marvelous	September 13, 2019		
Dragon Quest XI S: Echoes of an Elusive Age Definitive Edition	Square Enix	September 27, 2019		
Fitness Boxing 2: Rhythm and Exercise	Imagineer	December 4, 2020		
Bravely Default 2	Square Enix	February 26, 2021		
Triangle Strategy	Square Enix	March 4, 2022		
Live A Live	Square Enix	July 22, 2022		
Fitness Boxing 3: Your Personal Trainer	Imagineer	December 5, 2024		
PAL regions only
Title	Licensor(s)	Release date		Ref.
Title	Licensor(s)	PAL		Ref.
Shin Megami Tensei V	Atlus	November 12, 2021		

Nintendo as distributor only (no involvement in licensing or publishing)
North America and PAL regions only
Title	Licensor(s)	Release date		Ref.
Title	Licensor(s)	NA	PAL	Ref.
Ultra Street Fighter II: The Final Challengers	Capcom	May 26, 2017		
Doom	Bethesda Softworks	November 10, 2017		
The Elder Scrolls V: Skyrim	Bethesda Softworks	November 17, 2017		
Minecraft	Mojang Studios	June 20, 2018		
Wolfenstein II: The New Colossus	Bethesda Softworks	June 29, 2018		
Layton's Mystery Journey: Katrielle and the Millionaires' Conspiracy – Deluxe Edition	Level-5	November 8, 2019		
SNK Heroines: Tag Team Frenzy	SNK	September 7, 2018		
Dark Souls Remastered	Bandai Namco Entertainment	October 19, 2018		
Travis Strikes Again: No More Heroes	Grasshopper Manufacture	January 18, 2019		
Snack World: The Dungeon Crawl Gold	Level-5	February 14, 2020		
Deadly Premonition 2: A Blessing in Disguise	Toybox	July 10, 2020		
Minecraft Dungeons: Hero Edition	Mojang Studios	September 8, 2020		
Hades	Supergiant Games	September 17, 2020		
Minecraft Dungeons: Ultimate Edition	Mojang Studios	July 28, 2021		
No More Heroes III	Grasshopper Manufacture	August 27, 2021		
Grand Theft Auto: The Trilogy – The Definitive Edition	Rockstar Games	November 11, 2021		
Minecraft Legends	Mojang Studios	April 18, 2023		
Disney Illusion Island	Disney Electronic Content	July 28, 2023		
Red Dead Redemption	Rockstar Games	August 17, 2023		
Fae Farm	Phoenix Labs	September 8, 2023		
Fashion Dreamer	Marvelous	November 3, 2023		
Super Monkey Ball Banana Rumble	Sega	June 25, 2024		
Hades II	Supergiant Games	September 25, 2025		
North America only
Title	Licensor(s)	Release date		Ref.
Title	Licensor(s)	NA		Ref.
New Super Lucky's Tale	Playful Studios	November 8, 2019		
PAL regions only
Title	Licensor(s)	Release date		Ref.
Title	Licensor(s)	PAL		Ref.
Mario & Sonic at the Olympic Games Tokyo 2020	Sega Sports R&D	November 8, 2019		
Harvest Moon: One World	Natsume	March 5, 2021		
Monster Hunter Rise	Capcom	March 26, 2021		
Monster Hunter Stories 2: Wings of Ruin	Capcom	July 9, 2021		
Chocobo GP	Square Enix	March 10, 2022		
Australia only
Title	Licensor(s)	Release date		Ref.
Title	Licensor(s)	DE		Ref.
Master Detective Archives: Rain Code	Spike Chunsoft	June 30, 2023		
Germany only
Title	Licensor(s)	Release date		Ref.
Title	Licensor(s)	DE		Ref.
Schlag den Star - Das Spiel	bitComposer	September 29, 2017		

=== eShop exclusives ===
Licenses owned or co-owned by Nintendo
Title	Developer(s)	Release date			Ref.
Title	Developer(s)	JP	NA	PAL	Ref.
Snipperclips - Cut It Out, Together!	SFB Games	March 3, 2017	March 3, 2017	March 3, 2017	
Flip Wars (Note: Published by Nintendo outside Japan.)	Over Fence Co. Ltd.	May 18, 2017	August 10, 2017	July 6, 2017	
Karaoke Joysound for Nintendo Switch	Xing	December 6, 2017	Unreleased	Unreleased	
Pokémon Quest (Note: Published by The Pokémon Company in Japan.)	Game Freak	May 29, 2018	May 29, 2018	May 29, 2018	
Nintendo Entertainment System – Nintendo Classics	Nintendo European Research & Development	September 19, 2018	September 19, 2018	September 19, 2018	
Tetris 99	Arika	February 13, 2019	February 13, 2019	February 13, 2019	
BoxBoy! + BoxGirl!	HAL Laboratory	April 26, 2019	April 26, 2019	April 26, 2019	
Cadence of Hyrule - Crypt of the NecroDancer Featuring The Legend of Zelda	Brace Yourself Games	June 13, 2019	June 13, 2019	June 13, 2019	
Super Kirby Clash	HAL Laboratory; Vanpool	September 4, 2019	September 4, 2019	September 4, 2019	
Super Nintendo Entertainment System – Nintendo Classics	Nintendo European Research & Development	September 5, 2019	September 5, 2019	September 5, 2019	
The Stretchers	Tarsier Studios	November 8, 2019	November 8, 2019	November 8, 2019	
Pokémon Home	ILCA	February 12, 2020	February 11, 2020	February 12, 2020	
Good Job!	Paladin Studios	March 26, 2020	March 26, 2020	March 26, 2020	
Jump Rope Challenge	Nintendo EPD	June 16, 2020	June 16, 2020	June 16, 2020	
Pokémon Café Mix (Note: Updated as Pokémon Café ReMix on October 28, 2021.)	Genius Sonority	June 24, 2020	June 23, 2020	June 24, 2020	
Kirby Fighters 2	HAL Laboratory; Vanpool	September 23, 2020	September 23, 2020	September 23, 2020	
Super Mario Bros. 35	Arika	October 1, 2020	October 1, 2020	October 1, 2020	
Mario Kart Live: Home Circuit	Velan Studios	October 16, 2020	October 16, 2020	October 16, 2020	
Part Time UFO	HAL Laboratory	October 28, 2020	October 28, 2020	October 28, 2020	
Fire Emblem: Shadow Dragon and the Blade of Light	Intelligent Systems	Unreleased	December 4, 2020	December 4, 2020	
Famicom Detective Club: The Missing Heir	Mages	May 14, 2021	May 14, 2021	May 14, 2021	
Famicom Detective Club: The Girl Who Stands Behind	Mages	May 14, 2021	May 14, 2021	May 14, 2021	
Pokémon Unite	TiMi Studio Group	July 21, 2021	July 21, 2021	July 21, 2021	
Nintendo 64 – Nintendo Classics	Nintendo European Research & Development, iQue	October 25, 2021	October 25, 2021	October 25, 2021	
SEGA Genesis – Nintendo Classics	M2	October 25, 2021	October 25, 2021	October 25, 2021	
Pokémon Café ReMix (Note: Originally released as Pokémon Café Mix on June 24, 2020.)	Genius Sonority	October 28, 2021	October 28, 2021	October 28, 2021	
Kirby's Dream Buffet	HAL Laboratory	August 17, 2022	August 17, 2022	August 17, 2022	
Game Boy – Nintendo Classics	Nintendo European Research & Development	February 8, 2023	February 8, 2023	February 8, 2023	
Game Boy Advance – Nintendo Classics	Nintendo European Research & Development	February 8, 2023	February 8, 2023	February 8, 2023	
Pikmin	Nintendo European Research & Development	June 21, 2023	June 21, 2023	June 21, 2023	
Pikmin 2	Nintendo European Research & Development	June 21, 2023	June 21, 2023	June 21, 2023	
F-Zero 99	Nintendo Software Technology	September 14, 2023	September 14, 2023	September 14, 2023	
Pokémon Friends	Wonderfy	July 22, 2025	July 22, 2025	July 22, 2025	
Hello, Mario!	Nintendo	August 26, 2025	February 19, 2026	February 19, 2026	
Super Mario Galaxy	Nintendo EPD Nintendo Software Technology	October 2, 2025	October 2, 2025	October 2, 2025	
Super Mario Galaxy 2	Nintendo EPD Nintendo Software Technology	October 2, 2025	October 2, 2025	October 2, 2025	
Hello, Yoshi!	Nintendo	November 18, 2025	April 9, 2026	April 9, 2026	
Virtual Boy – Nintendo Classics	Nintendo European Research & Development	February 17, 2026	February 17, 2026	February 17, 2026	
Pokémon FireRed and LeafGreen Version	Game Freak	February 27, 2026	February 27, 2026	February 27, 2026	
Pokémon Champions	The Pokémon Works	April 8, 2026	April 8, 2026	April 8, 2026	
Hello, Luigi!	Nintendo	October 6, 2026	October 5, 2026	October 6, 2026	
Hello, Peach!	Nintendo	October 6, 2026	October 5, 2026	October 6, 2026	

The Pokémon Company-published titles (Note: The Pokémon Company is jointly owned by Nintendo, Game Freak, and Creatures.)
Title	Developer(s)	Release date		
Title	Developer(s)	JP	NA	PAL
Pokémon TV	The Pokémon Company	August 26, 2021 (Note: Shut down on March 28, 2024.)		

== Nintendo Switch 2 ==
Licenses owned or co-owned by Nintendo
Title	Developer(s)	Release date			Ref.
Title	Developer(s)	JP	NA	PAL	Ref.
Mario Kart World	Nintendo EPD	June 5, 2025			
Donkey Kong Bananza	Nintendo EPD	July 17, 2025			
Hyrule Warriors: Age of Imprisonment (Note: Published by Nintendo outside Japan.)	AAA Games Studio	November 6, 2025			
Kirby Air Riders	Bandai Namco Studios, Sora Ltd.	November 20, 2025			
Mario Tennis Fever	Camelot Software Planning	February 12, 2026			
Pokémon Pokopia (Note: Published by The Pokémon Company in Japan.)	Game Freak, Omega Force	March 5, 2026			
Yoshi and the Mysterious Book	Good-Feel	May 21, 2026			
Star Fox	Velan Studios	June 25, 2026			
Splatoon Raiders	Nintendo EPD	July 23, 2026			
Fire Emblem: Fortune's Weave	Intelligent Systems	September 17, 2026			
Nintendo Switch Sports Resort	Nintendo EPD	October 22, 2026			
The Legend of Zelda: Ocarina of Time	Nintendo EPD	November 5, 2026			
Metroid Ravenous	MercurySteam, Nintendo EPD	January 28, 2027			
Hyrule Warriors: Age of Calamity – Definitive Edition	Omega Force, AAA Games Studio	February 25, 2027			
Kirby and the World Beyond	HAL Laboratory	Spring 2027			
Pokémon Winds and Waves	Game Freak	2027			
Xenoblade Genesis	Monolith Soft	2027			

Nintendo as distributor only (no involvement in licensing or publishing)
North America and PAL regions only
Title	Licensor(s)	Release date		Ref.
Title	Licensor(s)	NA	PAL	Ref.
Bravely Default: Flying Fairy HD Remaster	Square Enix	June 5, 2025		
Street Fighter 6	Capcom	June 5, 2025		
Hades II – Nintendo Switch 2 Edition	Supergiant Games	September 25, 2025		
Orbitals	Kepler Interactive	September 3, 2026		
Minecraft Dungeons II	Mojang Studios	September 29, 2026		
Minecraft	Mojang Studios	October 27, 2026		
The Duskbloods	FromSoftware	2027		

=== eShop exclusives ===
Licenses owned or co-owned by Nintendo
Title	Developer(s)	Release date			Ref.
Title	Developer(s)	JP	NA	PAL	Ref.
Nintendo Switch 2 Welcome Tour	Nintendo EPD, Nintendo Cube	June 5, 2025			
Nintendo GameCube – Nintendo Classics	Nintendo European Research & Development	June 5, 2025			
Drag x Drive	Nintendo EPD	August 14, 2025			

=== Nintendo Switch 2 Editions ===
Due to the backward compatibility of the Nintendo Switch 2, the vast majority of the Nintendo Switch library is playable on the system. Certain titles, however, have received updated versions optimized for Nintendo Switch 2 hardware. These updates may include visual enhancements, improved frame rates, and support for additional control features, such as mouse functionality.

These upgrades are sold as Nintendo Switch 2 Editions, which are available as standalone physical releases for Nintendo Switch 2 and may also be obtained as paid upgrades via the Nintendo eShop by owners of the original Nintendo Switch version. Physical Nintendo Switch 2 Edition cartridges are also compatible with Nintendo Switch systems, where they launch and play as the original Nintendo Switch version of the game. Some editions may include new exclusive content.

Licenses owned or co-owned by Nintendo
Title	Developer(s)	Release date			Ref.
Title	Developer(s)	JP	NA	PAL	Ref.
The Legend of Zelda: Breath of the Wild – Nintendo Switch 2 Edition	Nintendo Technology Development	June 5, 2025			
The Legend of Zelda: Tears of the Kingdom – Nintendo Switch 2 Edition	Nintendo Technology Development	June 5, 2025			
Super Mario Party Jamboree – Nintendo Switch 2 Edition + Jamboree TV	Nintendo Cube	July 24, 2025			
Kirby and the Forgotten Land – Nintendo Switch 2 Edition + Star-Crossed World	HAL Laboratory	August 28, 2025			
Pokémon Legends: Z-A – Nintendo Switch 2 Edition (Note: Published by The Pokémon Company in Japan.)	Game Freak	October 16, 2025			
Metroid Prime 4: Beyond – Nintendo Switch 2 Edition	Retro Studios	December 4, 2025			
Animal Crossing: New Horizons – Nintendo Switch 2 Edition	Nintendo EPD	January 15, 2026			
Xenoblade Chronicles X: Definitive Edition – Nintendo Switch 2 Edition	Monolith Soft	February 19, 2026 (Note: Digital release.)			
Xenoblade Chronicles X: Definitive Edition – Nintendo Switch 2 Edition	Monolith Soft	April 16, 2026 (Note: Physical release.)			
Super Mario Bros. Wonder – Nintendo Switch 2 Edition + Meetup in Bellabel Park	Nintendo EPD	March 26, 2026			
Xenoblade Chronicles: Definitive Edition – Nintendo Switch 2 Edition	Monolith Soft, logicalbeat	June 10, 2026	June 9, 2026	June 9, 2026	
Xenoblade Chronicles: Definitive Edition – Nintendo Switch 2 Edition	Monolith Soft, logicalbeat	July 30, 2026			
Xenoblade Chronicles 2 – Nintendo Switch 2 Edition	Monolith Soft, logicalbeat	July 30, 2026			
Xenoblade Chronicles 2 – Nintendo Switch 2 Edition	Monolith Soft, logicalbeat	October 1, 2026			
Pikmin 4 – Nintendo Switch 2 Edition + Dandori Academy	Nintendo EPD, Eighting	November 12, 2026			
Xenoblade Chronicles 3 – Nintendo Switch 2 Edition	Monolith Soft, logicalbeat	December 3, 2026			

Licensed to Nintendo (original release published by another company)
North America and PAL regions only
Title	Licensor(s)	Release date		Ref.
Title	Licensor(s)	NA	PAL	Ref.
Fitness Boxing 3: Your Personal Trainer – Nintendo Switch 2 Edition	Imagineer	July 16, 2026		

== See also ==
- List of Nintendo Switch games
- List of Nintendo Switch 2 games
