= Kevin Afghani =

American voice actor (born 1996)

- Born: Kevin Zachary Afghani; November 9, 1996 (age 30)
- Occupation: Voice actor
- Years active: 2018–present
- Notable work: Voice of Mario, Luigi, Wario, and Waluigi in the Mario franchise
- Website: kevinzafghani.com

Kevin Zachary Afghani (born November 9, 1996) is an American voice actor. He is best known for succeeding Charles Martinet as the voice of Mario, Luigi, and other characters in the Mario franchise since 2023, beginning with the Nintendo Switch game Super Mario Bros. Wonder.

Afghani has also had voice roles in other games such as Genshin Impact (2020), Final Fantasy VII Rebirth (2024), and Rivals of Aether II (2024).

== Career ==
Afghani entered the voice acting industry in 2018. Before his Mario voice roles, Afghani voiced Raditz in Dragon Ball R&R, provided voice-over work for Nintendo Switch commercials, and voiced Arnold in the English dub of Genshin Impact.

Afghani succeeded Charles Martinet as the voice of Mario and Luigi beginning with Super Mario Bros. Wonder, while Martinet became Mario's brand ambassador. He also began as Wario in WarioWare: Move It!, Waluigi in Super Mario Party Jamboree, Baby Mario and Baby Luigi in Mario Kart World, and Baby Wario and Baby Waluigi in Mario Tennis Fever.

== Personal life ==
Afghani was born on November 9, 1996. He was inspired to pursue a career in voice acting by his interests in animation and video games. He works and resides in Los Angeles, California, where he is professionally represented by the Dean Panaro Talent agency.

== Filmography ==
=== Video games ===
Year	Game	Role	Notes	Ref.
2022	Genshin Impact	Arnold	English dub	
2023	Super Mario Bros. Wonder	Mario, Luigi	Debut as Mario and Luigi	
2023	WarioWare: Move It!	Wario, Mario, Luigi	Debut as Wario	
2024	Final Fantasy VII Rebirth	Additional voices		
2024	Super Mario Party Jamboree	Mario, Luigi, Wario, Waluigi	Debut as Waluigi	
2024	Rivals of Aether II	Forsburn		(Note: @AetherStudios (October 21, 2024). "The Exiled Flame has returned! The legendary @KevinAfghani is the voice of Forsburn in Rivals of Aether II!" (Tweet) – via X (formerly Twitter).)
2024	Mario & Luigi: Brothership	Mario, Luigi		
2024	Warframe	Amir (Volt)	Warframe: 1999 expansion	(Note: "Meet the Voices of the Warframe: 1999 Demo". Warframe.com. July 20, 2024.)
2025	Mario Kart World	Mario, Luigi, Wario, Waluigi, Baby Mario, Baby Luigi	Debut as Baby Mario and Baby Luigi	
2025	Hello, Mario!	Mario	Uncredited	
2026	Mario Tennis Fever	Mario, Luigi, Wario, Waluigi, Baby Mario, Baby Luigi, Baby Wario, Baby Waluigi	Debut as Baby Wario and Baby Waluigi	
2026	Hello, Luigi!	Luigi	Uncredited	

=== Web ===
Year	Series	Role	Ref.
2018–2021	Dragon Ball R&R	Raditz	
2020	Anime Penguin: Red Snow	Spike	
2020–2022	Mashed	Cuphead, Detective, General, Grunt, Boyfriend, Spike	
2022	Secret History of Cuphead	Detective, General, Grunt	
2023	Among Us & Cuphead (Secret History Volume 4)	Detective, General, Grunt	
