= Mario =

Video game character

- Mario and Donkey Kong character
- Promotional art by Shigehisa Nakaue (2017)
- First game: Donkey Kong (1981)
- Created by: Shigeru Miyamoto
- Designed by: Shigeru Miyamoto; Yōichi Kotabe
- Voiced by: English: Charles Martinet (1991–2023); Kevin Afghani (2023–present); Peter Cullen (Saturday Supercade); Lou Albano (The Super Mario Bros. Super Show!); Walker Boone (The Adventures of Super Mario Bros. 3, Super Mario World); Ronald B. Ruben (Mario Teaches Typing); Marc Graue (Hotel Mario); Stevie Coyle (1992, 1997–1998; Mario in Real-Time, E3 puppet); Toney Pope (Super Mario Bros. Audio Poster Pack); David Platshon (Mario's Time Machine Deluxe); Chris Pratt (Illumination films); Japanese: Tōru Furuya (1986–1998) (Note: Super Mario Bros.: The Great Mission to Rescue Princess Peach!, Super Mario's Fire Brigade, Super Mario's Traffic Safety, Amada Anime Series: Super Mario Bros., Super Mario World: Mario & Yoshi's Adventure Land, Nagatanien Super Mario Bros. furikake commercial, BS Super Mario USA, Excitebike: Bun Bun Mario Battle Stadium and BS Super Mario Collection, via Satellaview broadcasting only for last three); Hiroshi Otake (1986) (Note: Mario's Great Adventure); Nozomu Sasaki (1990) (Note: Super Mario Bros. Special Drama CD); Kōsei Tomita (1993–1994) (Note: Japanese dubs of Super Mario Bros. film); Mayumi Tanaka (Mario Kirby Masterpiece Video); Mamoru Miyano (Illumination films)
- Portrayed by: Lou Albano (The Super Mario Bros. Super Show!); Bob Hoskins (1993 film)

In-universe information
- Occupation: Plumber (Note: According to Nintendo, Mario has seven careers, which include plumber, doctor, racer, martial artist, basketball player, baseball player, and soccer player. However, plumbing is Mario's primary occupation. Additionally, he was formerly a carpenter in the original Donkey Kong games.)
- Family: Luigi (brother)

Mario (/ˈmɑːrioʊ, ˈmærioʊ/ MAR(R)-ee-oh; Japanese: マリオ) is a character created by Japanese video game designer Shigeru Miyamoto. He is the main character of the Mario franchise, a recurring character in the Donkey Kong franchise, and the mascot of their owner, the Japanese company Nintendo. Mario is an Italian-American plumber who lives in the Mushroom Kingdom with his younger twin brother, Luigi. Their adventures generally involve rescuing Princess Peach from the villain Bowser while using power-ups that give them different abilities. Mario is distinguished by his large nose and mustache, overalls, red cap, and high-pitched, exaggerated Italian accent. Prior to being named Mario, the character was referred to as Ossan, Mr. Video, and Jumpman.

Mario debuted as the player character of Donkey Kong, a 1981 platform game. Miyamoto created Mario because Nintendo was unable to license Popeye as the protagonist. The graphical limitations of arcade hardware influenced Mario's design, such as his nose, mustache, and overalls, and he was named after Nintendo of America's landlord, Mario Segale. Mario then starred in Mario Bros. (1983). Its 1985 Nintendo Entertainment System sequel, Super Mario Bros., began the successful Super Mario platformer series. Charles Martinet voiced Mario from 1991 to 2023, when he was succeeded by Kevin Afghani.

Mario has appeared in hundreds of video games. These include puzzle games such as Dr. Mario, role-playing games such as Paper Mario and Mario & Luigi, and sports games such as Mario Kart and Mario Tennis. He lacks a set personality and consistent profession, allowing him to take on many different roles across the Mario franchise. Mario is often accompanied by a large cast of supporting characters, including friends like Princess Daisy, Toad, and Yoshi and rivals like Bowser Jr., Donkey Kong, and Wario. Mario appears in other Nintendo properties, such as the Super Smash Bros. series of crossover fighting games.

Mario is an established pop culture icon and one of the most famous characters in history. His likeness has been featured in merchandise, and people and places have been nicknamed after him. He inspired many video game characters, including Sega's Sonic the Hedgehog, and unofficial media. The Mario franchise is the best-selling video game franchise of all time. Mario has been adapted in various media; he was portrayed in live-action by Lou Albano in The Super Mario Bros. Super Show! and by Bob Hoskins in the 1993 film Super Mario Bros.. Chris Pratt voiced him in the animated films The Super Mario Bros. Movie (2023) and The Super Mario Galaxy Movie (2026).

== Concept and creation ==
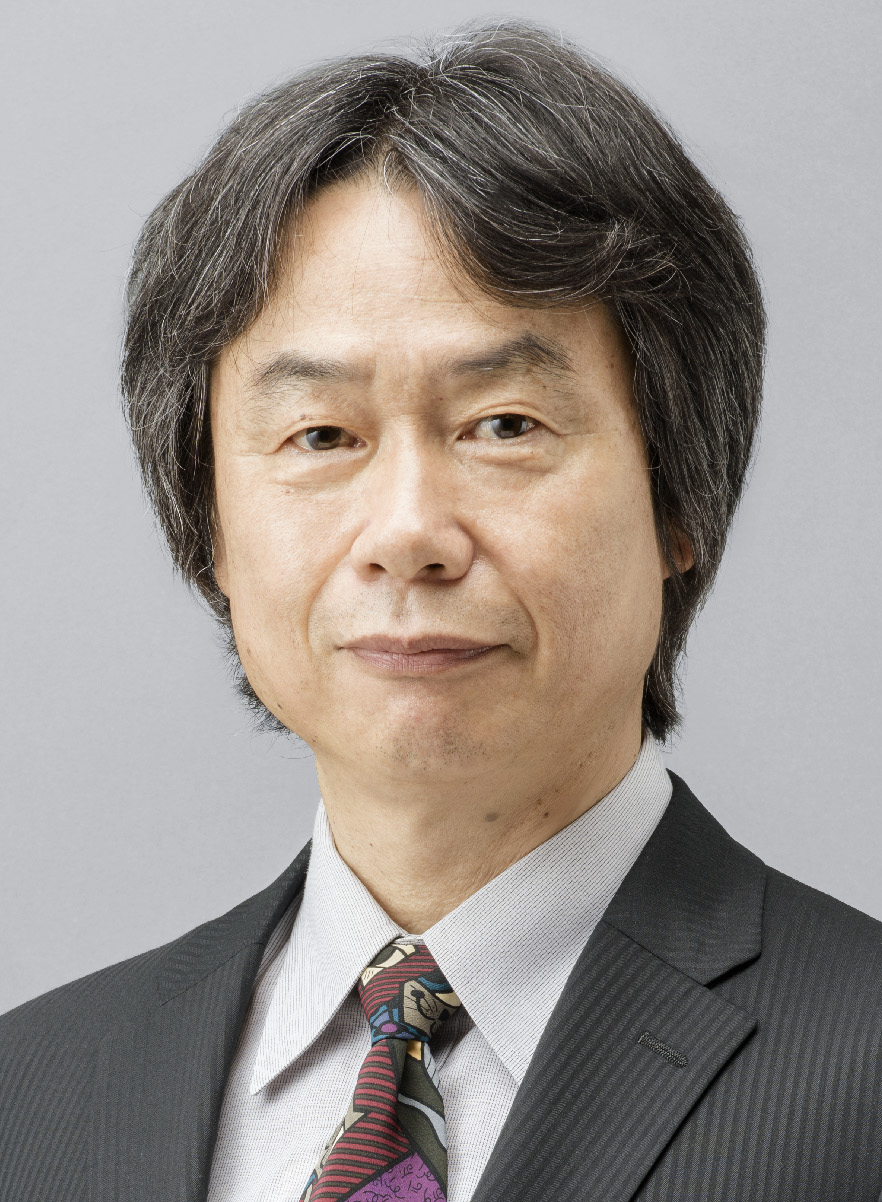
Shigeru Miyamoto is the creator of Mario.

Shigeru Miyamoto created Mario while developing Donkey Kong in an attempt to produce Nintendo's first blockbuster video game; previous games, such as Sheriff, had not achieved the success of games such as Namco's Pac-Man. Originally, Miyamoto wanted to create a game that used the 1930s characters Popeye, Bluto, and Olive Oyl. At the time, however, because Nintendo was unable to acquire a license to use the characters (and did not until 1982 with Popeye), he ended up creating an unnamed player character, along with Donkey Kong and Lady (later renamed Pauline).

In early development of Donkey Kong, Mario was drawn using pixel dots in a 16x16 grid. The focus of the game was to escape a maze, and Mario could not jump. However, Miyamoto soon introduced jumping capabilities for the player character, reasoning that "If you had a barrel rolling towards you, what would you do?" Continuing to draw from 1930s media, King Kong was an inspiration, and Mario was set in New York City.

=== Name ===
Mario was first called "Ossan" by the development team behind the original Donkey Kong. Although he was unnamed in the Japanese launch release of Donkey Kong, he was named "Jumpman" in the English instructions and "little Mario" in the sales brochure. Miyamoto envisioned a "go-to" character as needed for any game he developed, though limited to cameo appearances because he did not expect the character to become singularly popular. To this end, he originally named the character Mr. Video, comparing what he intended for the character's appearances in later games to the cameos that Alfred Hitchcock had done within his films. In retrospect, Miyamoto commented that if he had used the name "Mr. Video", the character likely would have "disappeared off the face of the Earth".

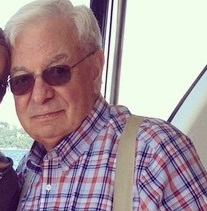
The character was named after real estate developer Mario Segale.

According to a widely circulated story, during the localization of Donkey Kong for American audiences, Nintendo of America's warehouse landlord, Mario Segale, confronted then-president Minoru Arakawa, demanding back rent. Following a heated argument in which the Nintendo employees eventually convinced Segale he would be paid, they opted to name the character after him. This story is contradicted by former Nintendo of America warehouse manager Don James, who stated in 2012 that he and Arakawa named the character after Segale as a joke because Segale was so reclusive that none of the employees had ever met him. James repeated this account in 2018. A friend of Segale commented: "My direct understanding and perception is that Mario Segale doesn't mind at all the fact that his name inspired such an iconic character, and that he shows humble pride in that fact in front of his grandchildren and close-knit adult circles."

Though it is implied by the title of the Mario Bros. series, in a 1989 interview, his full name was stated not to be "Mario Mario". The first notable use of "Mario Mario" is in the 1993 live-action film adaptation of the Super Mario series, and further in Prima's official video game strategy guides, in 2000 for Mario Party 2 and in 2003 for Mario & Luigi: Superstar Saga. In 2012, after Mario voice actor Charles Martinet stated that the character's name was, in fact, "Mario Mario" at San Diego Comic-Con, Nintendo CEO Satoru Iwata said Mario had no last name, with which Miyamoto agreed the month after. Two months after Iwata's death in July 2015, Miyamoto changed his stance, asserting at the Super Mario Bros. 30th Anniversary festival that Mario's full name is indeed "Mario Mario". Mario can also be referred to as Super Mario when he acquires the Super Mushroom power-up.

=== Appearance and profession ===
According to Miyamoto, Mario's profession was chosen to fit with the game design. Because Donkey Kong takes place on a construction site, Mario was made into a carpenter; and when he appeared again in Mario Bros., it was decided that he should be a plumber, because a lot of the game is situated in underground settings. Mario's character design, particularly his large nose, draws on Western influences; once he became a plumber, Miyamoto decided to "put him in New York" and make him Italian, light-heartedly attributing Mario's nationality to his mustache. Other sources have Mario's profession chosen to be carpentry in an effort to depict the character as an ordinary hard worker, making it easier for players to identify with him. After a colleague suggested that Mario more closely resembled a plumber, Miyamoto changed Mario's profession accordingly and developed Mario Bros., featuring the character in the sewers of New York City.

Due to the graphical limitations of arcade hardware at the time, Miyamoto clothed the character in red overalls and a blue shirt to contrast against each other and the background, making the movements of his arms easily perceptible. A red cap was added to let Miyamoto avoid drawing the character's hairstyle, forehead, and eyebrows, as well as to circumvent the issue of animating his hair as he jumped. To give distinctly human facial features with the limited graphical abilities, Miyamoto drew a large nose and a mustache, which avoided the need to draw a mouth and facial expressions. Omitting a mouth circumvented the problem of clearly separating the nose from the mouth with a limited number of pixels available.

Over time, Mario's appearance has become more defined; blue eyes, white gloves, brown shoes, a red "M" in a white circle on the front of his hat and gold buttons on his overalls have been added. According to an interview, Japanese character designer Yōichi Kotabe, who worked on redesigning characters in Super Mario Bros. (1985), revealed the M on his hat originally resembled the Golden Arches; Kotabe later changed the design of the M and straightened its lines to clearly distinguish the difference. The colors of his shirt and overalls were also reversed from a blue shirt with red overalls to a red shirt with blue overalls. Miyamoto attributed this process to the different development teams and artists for each game as well as advances in technology.

=== Voice acting ===
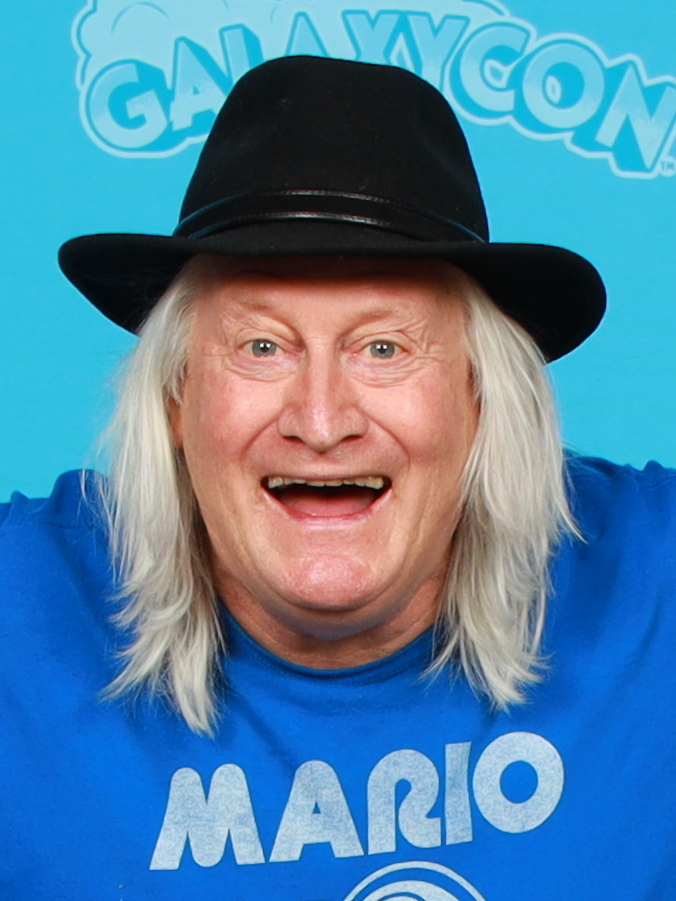
Charles Martinet voiced Mario for over 30 years before shifting to a brand ambassador position.

Mario was voiced by Charles Martinet from 1991 to 2023. When he crashed the audition, the directors were preparing to close for the night, already packing up when he arrived. He was given this prompt: "an Italian plumber from Brooklyn". He immediately thought of a stereotypical Italian accent with a voice similar to that of a mobster. He then assumed the voice would be too harsh for children, so he planned on using a voice of an older figure. However, according to Martinet, the audition for Mario was the only time where his thoughts crashed and he spoke complete nonsense. After he was prompted about the character, he babbled the following in a soft and friendly voice instead:

Hello, ima Mario. Okey dokey, letsa make a pizza pie together, you go get somea spaghetti, you go geta some sausage, I getta some sauce, you gonna put some spaghetti on the sausage and the sausage on the pizza, then I'm gonna chasea you with the pizza, then you gonna chasea me with the pizza, and gonaa makea lasagne.

The voice he chose was derived from another voice role he used to play the character Gremio from William Shakespeare's The Taming of the Shrew. Martinet kept speaking with the voice until the audition tape ran out; the clip was the only tape sent back to Nintendo, and the director called the company to say he had "found our Mario". He used the voice for an attraction at trade shows where small tracking sensors were glued onto his face, and he remained hidden behind a curtain while voicing a 3D model of Mario's head on a television. When attendees approached the screen, they conversed and interacted with Mario. Due to the long shifts, Stevie Coyle was hired as a voice match to take over during breaks by Martinet's suggestion. The successful attraction was used for five years until Martinet was called by Miyamoto, requesting the voice for a video game.

His first official video game voice role is the CD rerelease of Mario Teaches Typing in 1994, and his first major voice acting role is Super Mario 64. He received Miyamoto's instructions on the types of sound clips needed, and Martinet appreciated the fun tone of the game and later called Miyamoto a genius. He continued to voice other various Mario characters, such as Luigi, Wario, and Waluigi. He said his time in the studio recording voice clips consisted of "45 takes of every sound [he] can think of". His time commitment has ranged from one week before a game's release to three years. The amount of clips varies from one hour of audio to 20. Martinet was recognized by the Guinness World Records for the most roles performed with the same character, at the time one hundred, and is the most of any video game voice actor. As of January 2022, he has voiced Mario in over 150 games and has recorded 5 million audio files with the voice. In an interview, Martinet said he wants to continue voicing the character until he "drops dead", or until he can no longer perform the voice accurately. In August 2023, Nintendo announced Martinet would be retiring from the voice role of Mario, and would continue to promote the franchise as a "Mario Ambassador", a brand ambassador position. Voice actor Kevin Afghani succeeded Martinet in Super Mario Bros. Wonder the following October.

== Characteristics ==
Mario is depicted as a portly plumber who lives in the fictional land of the Mushroom Kingdom with Luigi, his younger, taller brother. The original Mario Bros. depicted Mario and Luigi as Italians in New York, with the television series and films specifying them as originating from the borough Brooklyn. Mario's infancy, in which he was transported by a stork to the Mushroom Kingdom, was first depicted in Super Mario World 2: Yoshi's Island. In a 2005 interview, Miyamoto stated that Mario's physical age was about 24–25 years old, and Nintendo Power stated that his birthday is October 11. In an official 1993 manual by Nintendo, Mario was revealed to be of the "homo nintendonus" species and mushrooms were cited to be his favorite food. His taste in music was listed as "opera or new-wave, high-techno Euro pop". In a 2017 interview, Mario's identity as a human was questioned, and a Nintendo representative confirmed that Mario is indeed a human, noting the variety found in human nature, which justifies Mario's uniqueness.

He wears a long-sleeved red shirt, a pair of blue overalls with yellow/gold buttons, brown shoes, white gloves, and a red cap with a red "M" printed on a white circle. In Donkey Kong, he wears red overalls and a blue shirt. In the arcade version of Mario Bros., he wears a blue cap. In Super Mario Bros., he wears a brown shirt with red overalls. In Super Mario Bros. 3, he wears black overalls. He has blue eyes, and, like Luigi, has brown hair, and a dark brown or black mustache. This consistent difference in color is attributed to being a relic of the technical limitations of the vintage platforms, wherein certain features were actively distinguished but others had to be curtailed. Mario has a full head of hair; however, he was shown balding in early Donkey Kong merchandise. Although Mario is usually shown as a heroic figure, he once adapted a villainous role in the 1982 sequel to the original Donkey Kong game, Donkey Kong Jr.

Mario's occupation is plumbing, though in the original Donkey Kong games he is a carpenter. Mario has also assumed several other occupations: in the Dr. Mario series of puzzle games, which debuted in 1990, Mario is portrayed as a medical physician named "Dr. Mario"; in the Game Boy game Mario's Picross, Mario is an archaeologist; in the Mario vs. Donkey Kong series, Mario is the president of a profitable toy-making company. Mario partakes in sports activities such as tennis and golf in Mario sports games, as well as kart racing in the Mario Kart series. In September 2017, Nintendo confirmed on their official Japanese profile for the character that Mario was no longer considered a plumber, but the statement was changed in March 2018. According to Nintendo, Mario has seven careers, which include plumber, doctor, racer, martial artist, basketball player, baseball player, and soccer player.

Nintendo's characterization of Mario as a Brooklynite Italian-American has been described as an example of mukokuseki, or "nationlessness", with "roots across [the] three continents" of Europe, America, and Japan.

=== Relationships ===
Mario usually saves Princess Peach and the Mushroom Kingdom and purges antagonists, such as Bowser, from various areas; since his first game, Mario has usually had the role of saving the damsel in distress. Originally, he had to rescue his girlfriend Pauline in Donkey Kong (1981) from Donkey Kong. Despite being replaced as Mario's love interest by Princess Peach in Super Mario Bros., a redesigned Pauline that first appeared in Donkey Kong (1994) has reappeared in the Mario vs. Donkey Kong series, Super Mario Odyssey and the Mario Kart series as a friend of Mario. Mario reprises his role of saving Peach in the Super Mario series, but Mario himself was rescued by Peach in role-reversal in Super Princess Peach. Mario rescued Princess Daisy of Sarasaland in Super Mario Land, but Luigi has since been more linked to her; in Super Smash Bros. Melee, the text explaining Daisy states that "[a]fter her appearance in Mario Golf, some gossips started portraying her as Luigi's answer to Mario's Peach."

Luigi is Mario's younger fraternal twin brother, who is taller, slimmer, and can jump higher than him. He is a companion in the Mario games, and the character whom the second player controls in two-player sessions of many of the video games. Luigi has also occasionally rescued Mario as seen in Mario Is Missing! and the Luigi's Mansion series. Super Mario Land 2: 6 Golden Coins for the Game Boy saw the arrival of Wario, Mario's greedy counterpart and self-declared arch rival, who usually assumes the role of a main antagonist or an antihero. The dinosaur character Yoshi serves as Mario's steed and sidekick in games such as Super Mario World. Toad is Mario's trusted close friend, who gives him advice and supports him throughout his journey to rescue Princess Peach.

=== Abilities ===
During the development of Donkey Kong, Mario was known as Jumpman (ジャンプマン, Janpuman). Jumping—both to facilitate level traversal and as an offensive move—is a common gameplay element in Mario games, especially the Super Mario series. By the time Super Mario RPG was released, jumping became such a signature act of Mario that the player was often tasked with jumping to prove to non-player characters that he was Mario. Mario's most commonly portrayed form of attack is jumping to stomp on the heads of enemies, first used in Super Mario Bros. This jump-stomp move may entirely crush smaller enemies on the stage, and usually deal damage to larger ones, sometimes causing secondary effects. Subsequent games have elaborated on Mario's jumping-related abilities. Super Mario World added the ability to spin-jump, which allows Mario to break blocks beneath him. In Super Mario 64, Mario gains new jumping abilities such as a sideways somersault; a ground pound, which is a high-impact downward thrusting motion; and the "Wall Kick", which propels him upwards by kicking off walls.

Super Mario Bros. introduced the basic three power-ups that have become staples for the series, especially the 2D games – the Super Mushroom, a large red mushroom, which causes Mario to grow larger and be able to survive getting hit once; the Fire Flower, which allows Mario to throw fireballs; and the Super Star, which gives Mario temporary invincibility. These powers have appeared regularly throughout the series.

== In video games ==
=== Super Mario series ===
Traditional 2D (left/top) and 3D (right/bottom) Super Mario gameplay. In 2D, Mario is confined to moving left and right, while in 3D, Mario is free to move around and explore as the player pleases.

Mario is the protagonist of the Super Mario series. Each game varies in its plot, but most of them have the ultimate goal of Mario rescuing Princess Peach after being kidnapped by Bowser. Mario explores a variety of locations, titled "worlds", and along the way, he can collect items and defeat enemies. Most levels have an end goal, such as stars or flagpoles, that he needs to reach to move on to the next. The series is divided into two general sets of games: the 2D side-scrolling Super Mario games and the 3D open world Super Mario games.

==== 2D games ====
The Super Mario series had Mario starring in platform games, beginning with Super Mario Bros. on the Nintendo Entertainment System (NES) in 1985. In these games, Mario traverses worlds that contain a set number of levels for Mario to complete. In them, he traverses them from moving left to right, the screen scrolling in the direction he moves. Mario has the goal of reaching the end of the level to move onto the next, typically marked with a flagpole. These games are less focused on plot and more on platforming; most commonly, Bowser kidnaps Peach, and Mario, with the help of Luigi and other characters, sets out to rescue her. Most worlds have mini boss battles, which typically involve fighting Bowser Jr. or one of several Koopalings. The final level is a fight against Bowser.

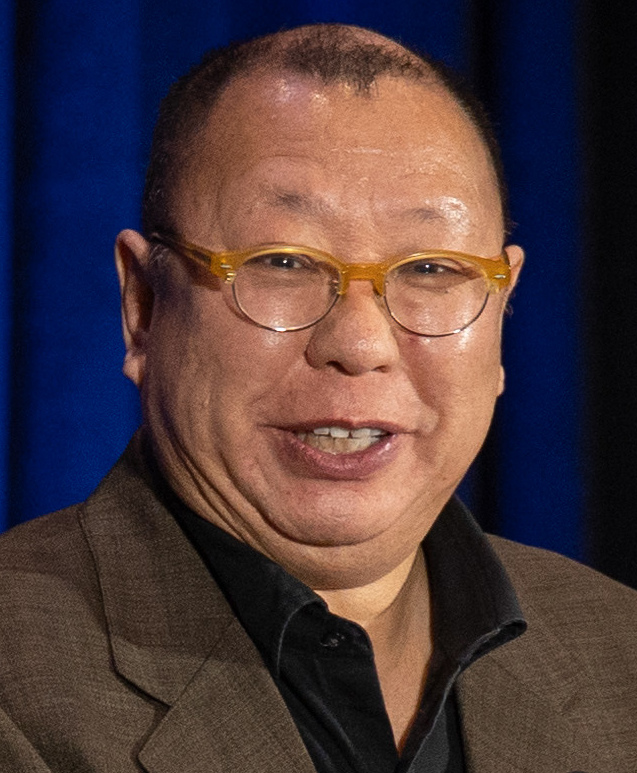
Takashi Tezuka in 2024

His first appearance in the 2D variant of the series was Super Mario Bros. in 1985, which began with a 16x32 pixel rectangle prototype as the character; Takashi Tezuka suggested the character to be Mario after the success of one of his previous roles, Mario Bros. Certain other gameplay concepts were cut as well, such as how Mario could fly in a rocket ship and fire bullets. Originally designed with a small Mario in mind with the intention of increasing his size further in development, the developers implemented the feature of his size changes via power-ups as they considered it a fun addition. The concept was influenced by Japanese folktales.

Super Mario Bros. 2 was originally not going to be a sequel to Super Mario Bros., and was originally going to be a game called Doki Doki Panic; directed by Kensuke Tanabe. One of the changes included the retexturing of the four main playable characters of Doki Doki Panic, and since they varied in height, this was the first instance where Mario was noticeably shorter than Luigi. Super Mario Bros. 3 experimented with Mario's looks with different power-ups that represented different creatures. An example included the raccoon tail, which was chosen over a power-up that represented a centaur. The game's success led to an animated television series, The Adventures of Super Mario Bros. 3, with Mario being portrayed by Walker Boone.

Hiroshi Yamauchi wanted a launch game for the Game Boy that featured Mario, as he believed in the statement "fun games sold consoles". Super Mario Land was designed without the help of Miyamoto, a first for the series. The game uses completely different elements to pair with the small screen due to the Game Boy's portability. For example, instead of rescuing Princess Peach from Bowser in the Mushroom Kingdom, Mario is instead rescuing Princess Daisy from Tatanga in Sarasaland. Mario was designed with line art.

Super Mario World was the first video game to feature Yoshi as a companion to Mario. Miyamoto had always wanted a dinosaur-like companion, ever since the original Super Mario Bros., but the concept was never achievable due to limited hardware. Since Super Mario World took place in a land of dinosaurs, Takashi Tezuka requested Shigefumi Hino to draw a character based on Miyamoto's concepts and sketches, which he drew during the development of Super Mario Bros. 3. Super Mario World was released during a console war between Nintendo and Sega; Sega's mascot, Sonic the Hedgehog, was considered a "cooler" alternative to Mario, to which Miyamoto apologized for.

The plot for Super Mario Land 2: 6 Golden Coins has Mario pursue something for his own benefit rather than for someone else, his goal trying to reclaim ownership of his island, Mario Land, from Wario. The game was developed by Nintendo Research & Development 1 (R&D1). The company was unmotivated by the Super Mario series, and when they were tasked with creating a Super Mario game without Miyamoto, they created Wario to emphasize the frustration of working with a character they did not make. The name "Wario" is word play of "Mario" and "Warui", the latter meaning "bad" in Japanese to mean "bad Mario".

The character's models and backgrounds in New Super Mario Bros. are 3D, but still only allow for left and right movement and are considered 2.5D. With the 2D series of Super Mario games being absent for 14 years, the previous installment being released in 1992, game mechanics improved drastically. Because the characters were no longer sprites and the backdrops are not tile-based, the developers were nearly restrictionless; new game mechanics, such as Mario teetering off of trees and swinging on ropes, were implemented. New Super Mario Bros. is the first 2D Super Mario game to have used voice acting, with Charles Martinet voicing Mario and Luigi. It was followed by three games similar to New Super Mario Bros., namely New Super Mario Bros. Wii, New Super Mario Bros. 2, and New Super Mario Bros. U, the latter of which being the first game to feature Mario in high-definition graphics (HD).

Takashi Tezuka returned as a producer for the development of Super Mario Bros. Wonder, with Shiro Mouri as director. The game director, Shiro Mouri, said that the game developers aimed to provide a "stress-free" experience to the players by allowing them to move freely through the course. In comparison to the previous 2D Super Mario games, Mario's facial expressions are now more detailed and expressive.

==== 3D games ====
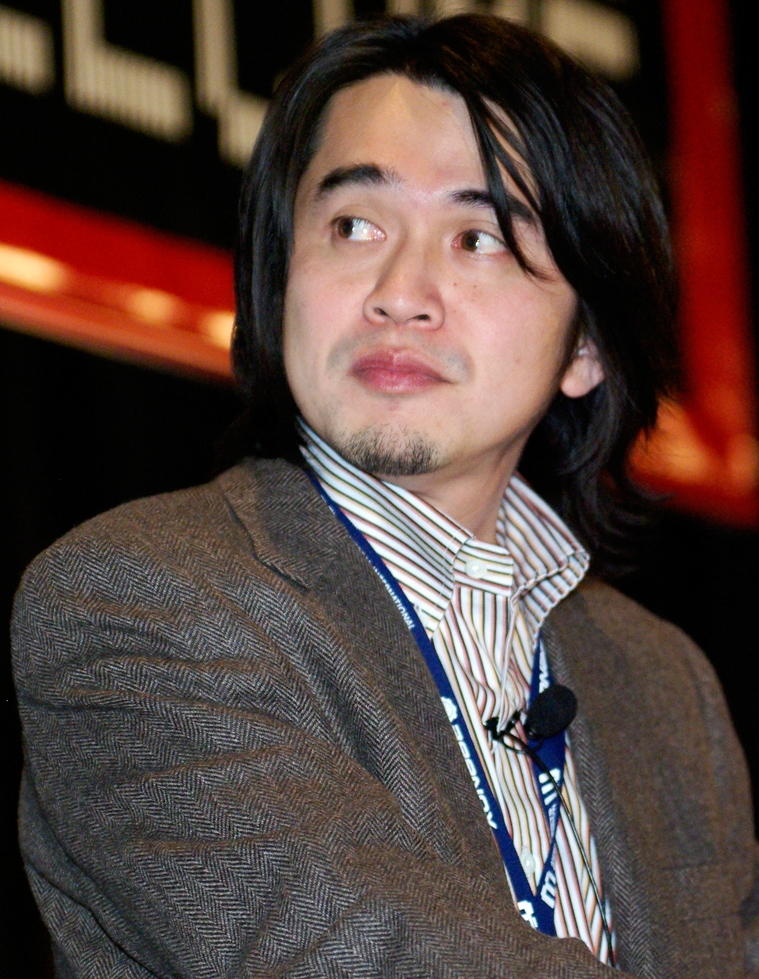
Super Mario 64 features Mario's first in-game 3D rendering. Due to 3D graphics being new at the time, Yoshiaki Koizumi had trouble programming movement with no frame of reference.

Most Super Mario games in 3D feature open world gameplay; instead of being confined to only moving left and right, Mario can move in any direction, and the player can complete the level however they please. The player chooses from one of the multiple objectives before entering a level, and Mario is tasked with completing that goal, which ultimately ends with an obtainable item such as a star. These games feature a more complex narrative, but most still have Mario rescuing a kidnapped Princess Peach from Bowser.

Mario's debut 3D role is in Super Mario 64; because the concept of 3D video games was still new at the time, the developers knew they were helping to pave the way for future games, and they were not restricted on what the standard game was like. However, when Yoshiaki Koizumi had to create a 3D model and animation of Mario, he had no frame of reference and struggled with the task. Koizumi stated how the whole concept was "arguably tough", but was overtaken by the enjoyment of innovating in a new field. Mario's movement was among the top priorities in the game's development, with his animation being tested long before the basic layout of the game's locations was in place. Super Mario 64 is one of the first games where Mario is voiced by Charles Martinet, and Mario's character model was made with the N-World toolkit. Mario's movements and animations were inspired by Arale Norimaki from Dr. Slump, a Japanese manga series.

Super Mario Sunshine is the first Nintendo game released after Satoru Iwata became the CEO of Nintendo, succeeding Hiroshi Yamauchi. The game's original concept did not feature Mario, as the developers believed the role was too out of the ordinary for such a character. Later, when they used a generic man for the role instead, they believed having a realistic person alongside a character like Mario would cause "incongruity", and it was ultimately changed to Mario instead. Mario's ally, F.L.U.D.D., was one of ten design options but was chosen because it fit the game's theme, although it was not their visual favorite.

Super Mario Galaxy had Mario exploring a number of spherical planets, which the developers at the time knew simply jumping on enemies would be difficult to perform. They instead took advantage of the Wii Remote and Nunchuk having motion controls, and gave Mario a "spin" attack where he knocked over the enemies via spinning. To also balance the game's difficulty, Mario was given fewer hit points.

To create a sense of familiarity for Super Mario Odyssey, various references to the Super Mario series were put in the game's environment. For example, Pauline was chosen to be a major aspect of the "Metro Kingdom" due to the kingdom representing the core of the game. Mario was also given a variety of costumes to represent other smaller games, such as the Mario's Picross series. The development team found the most fun way to use the Joy-Con controllers' motion controls was to throw a hat, and the gameplay was centered around Mario throwing his cap.

==== Other Super Mario games ====
A variety of Super Mario games star Mario that do not have typical 2D or 3D platforming. Super Mario 3D Land and Super Mario 3D World series has 3D gameplay, but the stages are linear and do not allow open-world movement. Super Mario Maker is a series of level editors where the player can create their own 2D Super Mario levels and play each other's levels. Super Mario Run is a 2D platforming mobile game with other unnatural gameplay aspects.

The main aspect of Super Mario 3D Land was bridging the aspects of 2D and 3D Super Mario games. One of the issues brought up was how Mario looked too small in comparison to the large terrain and the small, portable screen of the Nintendo 3DS, so the camera system needed to be fixed to one position in certain occasions. The game brought with it the "Tanooki Tail" power-up, which was originally introduced in Super Mario Bros. 3, and its existence was teased by the developers to the fans prior to its official announcement. Concepts for Mario, which included a skater outfit and a power-up that makes Mario grow large, were cut; the latter appeared in its sequel as the Mega Mushroom.

Super Mario 3D World on the Wii U includes the "Cat Mario" power-up, which was implemented to help newcomers play the game and add new gameplay features such as climbing up walls. Another power-up is the "Double Cherry", which was added accidentally; one of the developers added a second Mario into the game in error, and found it humorous when both Marios were somehow controllable at the same time. In 2021, also as part of the Super Mario Bros. 35th anniversary, Nintendo re-released Super Mario 3D World on the Nintendo Switch with a companion game, Bowser's Fury.

=== Other Mario games ===
Super Mario has the most prominent use of Mario, and he is in various spinoff series that split into numerous games covering various genres. This includes genres such as role-playing games (RPGs), puzzle games, sports games, and even educational games in the 1990s.

==== RPGs ====
Mario has been the protagonist of various role-playing video games (RPGs), beginning with Square's Super Mario RPG on the Super Nintendo Entertainment System (SNES). According to Yoshio Hongo of Nintendo, the game came out of Shigeru Miyamoto's desire to develop a Mario role-playing game while Square wanted a role-playing video game that sold well overseas. The game was notable at the time for having a unique blend of action and role-playing game elements, and was a critical and commercial success, and led to two other spinoff RPG series starring the character, Paper Mario and Mario & Luigi.

A sequel to Super Mario RPG was planned for the Nintendo 64. The original developer, Square, had signed a deal with Sony to release Final Fantasy VII for the PlayStation, so Nintendo passed on development responsibilities to Intelligent Systems. The new art designer, Naohiko Aoyama, changed every character to two-dimensional to bring out "cuter" graphics compared to low-polygon three-dimensional graphics on the console. In the Paper Mario series, Mario is often aided by numerous allies who progress the story while Mario remains silent.

Unlike Paper Mario, both Mario and Luigi have voices in the Mario & Luigi series. According to the developers, previous games use character sprites so the developers were generally inexperienced and did not know much about hardware at the time. Once the Nintendo 3DS was released, the developers had the chance to switch to 3-dimensional graphics. They changed the background and world design but kept the characters as 2D renderings of 3D characters because they believed it made it easier to convey comedic expressions. In 2013, they believed Mario took too much of the spotlight in the Mario franchise, and they made Luigi the more story-focused character in Mario & Luigi: Dream Team.

==== Sports games ====
Nintendo has released a variety of sports games featuring Super Mario properties, which include tennis, golf, baseball, soccer, kart racing, and other miscellaneous.

In the 1984 video game Golf, although one of the two playable characters looks similar to that of him, wearing red clothes and black pants, he is never directly referred to be Mario; In 1997, his look was changed in the re-release of the Famicom Disk System to that more like the character, and Nintendo later confirmed the character was Mario in a guide book of the game in 1991, marking his first sports video game appearance. He then directly appeared in NES Open Tournament Golf in 1991 as one of two playable characters, the other being Luigi, along with a variety of other Mario characters with supporting roles. The character sprites were designed by Eiji Aonuma, his first project in graphical art design.

Mario's Tennis for the Virtual Boy was the first tennis game featuring Mario. Camelot Software Planning, who previously developed Everybody's Golf for Sony, was contracted to develop Mario Tennis for the Nintendo 64. Each character had a unique ability, with Mario having an all-around average set of skills to pair with his type of character. This would eventually set the stage for future Mario Tennis video games.

The Mario Kart series began with Super Mario Kart for the Super Nintendo Entertainment System in 1992; early in development, the game did not have any Mario-themed elements. A few months into the process, the designers were testing how one character would look at another they had just passed. They implemented Mario, simply to see how he would look inside a kart, and the original concept was scrapped entirely after they decided he looked better than the previous non-defined characters. Similar to the Mario & Luigi series, he appears as a sprite that turns in 16 different angles.

Mario & Sonic at the Olympic Games is a crossover series of party and sports games featuring characters from the Mario franchise and the Sonic the Hedgehog series. It includes different varieties of sports such as skateboarding, fencing, volleyball, gymnastics, and many others.

==== Puzzle games ====
Mario has also starred in a variety of multiple puzzle games, but sometimes only makes an appearance and is not playable. The first of which to release was Wrecking Crew, designed by Yoshio Sakamoto. Surprisingly, in this game, Mario can't jump because of hammer's weight. After which, three main series and a variety of spin-offs were released starring him, including Dr. Mario, Mario vs. Donkey Kong, and Mario Picross.

The original game in the Dr. Mario series, also titled Dr. Mario, was designed by Takahiro Harada and had Mario assume the role of a doctor instead of a plumber. His appearance and role have generally remained the same; to celebrate his 30th anniversary in the series, an 8-bit rendering of his original appearance was made unlockable in the most recent game, Dr. Mario World. Mario vs. Donkey Kong is centered around "Mini Marios", wind-up toys that resemble Mario. The Mario's Picross series was an attempt by Nintendo to capitalize on the popularity of Mario and the success of puzzle games in Japan at the time. Released in 1995, the game was popular and was followed by two sequels, Mario's Super Picross and Picross 2, but the first game was only made available to American audiences in 2020.

Due to the abandonment of the SNES-CD hardware in the 1990s, a project developed by Nintendo and Phillips, as part of Nintendo's dissolving agreement with Philips, they gave the licensing rights to Mario and The Legend of Zelda property to release games on the CD-i. Multiple games were developed by the inexperienced Fantasy Factory, which included the puzzle game Hotel Mario in 1994. Hotel Mario had various cutscenes of Mario and Luigi, which borrowed animation elements from Disney and J. R. R. Tolkien. Mario was voiced by Marc Graue as the game was released prior to Charles Martinet receiving the role of voicing the character.

==== Educational games ====
As the popularity of the Super Mario series grows, various educational games starring the character were released and appealed to younger audiences in the 1990s. These games had little involvement from Nintendo, with the games releasing for the NES, Super Nintendo Entertainment System (SNES), and personal computers. The last of the genres to release was Mario Teaches Typing 2 in 1997, before the production of such games was discontinued.

Mario is Missing! is one of the only occasions where Mario himself was kidnapped and rescued by another character. In the game, Mario and Luigi approach Bowser to stop his plans, but Mario is then captured; Luigi traverses real-world locations to follow after him, solving trivia along the way. A similar game was released without the help of Miyamoto, Mario's Time Machine, which starred Mario against Bowser instead. Mario's Game Gallery has the player competing in various card and board games against Mario. The game was Charles Martinet's first official voice acting role for Mario, one year prior to Super Mario 64.

For Mario Teaches Typing, the head of Interplay Productions, Brian Fargo, saw the success of the typing game Mavis Beacon Teaches Typing, and knew a character like Mario as the teacher would be appealing. Pre-dating Mario's Game Gallery, Martinet did not voice Mario. After release, the concept was so successful, it began a negative relationship between Fargo and Les Crane, the creator of Mavis Beacon Teaches Typing. Mario Teaches Typing 2 was released in 1997, which Martinet voiced Mario for. When they were approved of creating Mario's Game Gallery, another Mario-themed education game was also released that was of poor quality, so Miyamoto met with Fargo and halted production of any further education games using the character.

=== Cameos ===
Apart from his platformer and spin-off game appearances, Mario has made guest appearances in other Nintendo games, such as Mike Tyson's Punch-Out!! and Tennis (1984), where Mario is an umpire, in Pac-Man Vs., he is the in-game announcer. Mario appears alongside Pauline in a bonus segment in Pinball (1984). He also appears as a playable character in every installment of the Super Smash Bros. series. He makes countless cameo appearances in many forms in many games, such as portraits and statues in The Legend of Zelda: A Link to the Past, The Legend of Zelda: Majora's Mask, The Legend of Zelda: Ocarina of Time, Pilotwings 64, and Stunt Race FX. Mario has a cameo appearance in Donkey Kong Country 2: Diddy's Kong Quest, despite having next to no presence in the Donkey Kong Country subseries. He can be seen in a crowd along with Luigi in Kirby Super Star. On an ending screen that appears in Nintendo's NES version of the video game Tetris, Mario appears with Luigi dancing to the music, which is a version from prelude to the opera Carmen; Peach, Bowser and various Nintendo characters also appear.

Outside of Nintendo-produced games, Mario has often appeared in third-party games on Nintendo consoles. Mario appears in Metal Gear Solid: The Twin Snakes as a figurine alongside Yoshi. Mario appears as a playable character in the GameCube versions of NBA Street V3 and SSX on Tour. Mario also appeared in Minecraft as a skin alongside other characters in the series. Monster Hunter 4 included Mario as one of the free DLC outfits alongside Luigi. The Wii U version of Scribblenauts Unlimited features Mario along with other Super Mario and The Legend of Zelda characters; they are not present in the 3DS version of the game. In December 2011, Ubisoft's Just Dance 3 included "Mario" as a downloadable dance track, with Mario appearing to dance on-screen. Rayman and Globox can wear costumes resembling Mario and Luigi respectively in the Wii U and Nintendo Switch versions of Rayman Legends.

== In other media ==
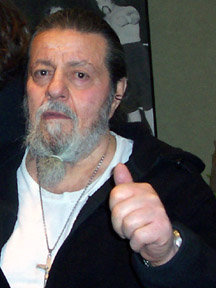
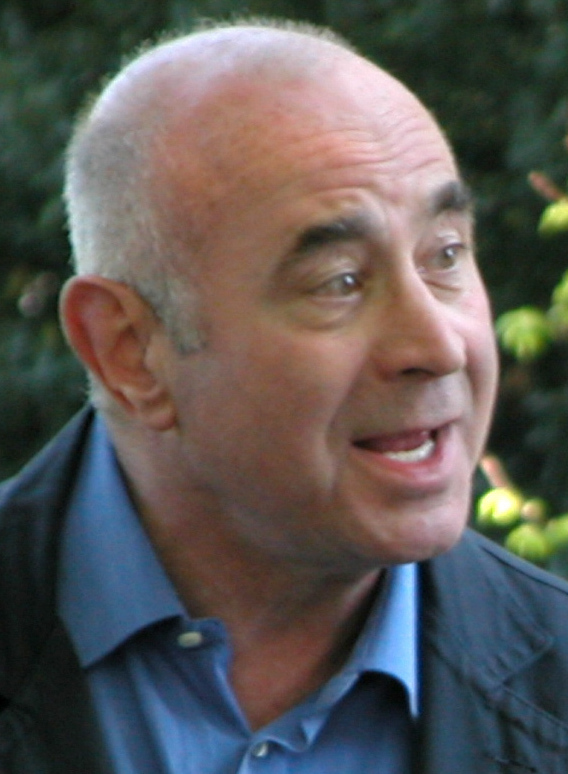
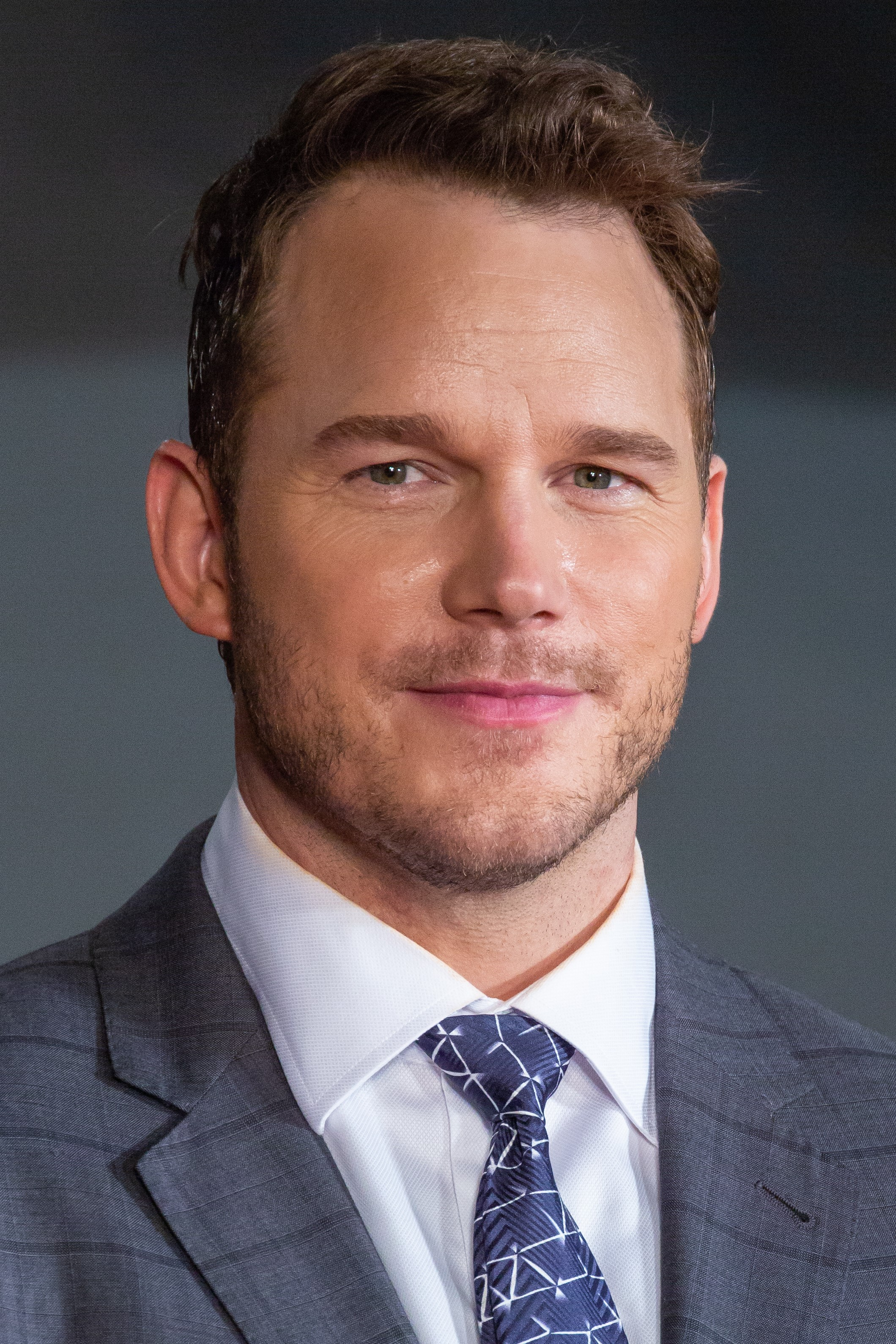
Lou Albano and Bob Hoskins have portrayed Mario in live-action, and Chris Pratt voiced the character for animated films.

The first appearance of Mario in media other than games was Saturday Supercade, an animated television series produced by Ruby-Spears Productions in 1983. The 1986 original video animation Super Mario Bros.: The Great Mission to Rescue Princess Peach! features Mario (voiced by Toru Furuya) as the protagonist. The animated series The Super Mario Bros. Super Show! features a live-action series of skits that stars former WWF manager "Captain" Lou Albano as Mario and Danny Wells as Luigi. Mario appeared in a book series, the Nintendo Adventure Books. The other two animated series, The Adventures of Super Mario Bros. 3 and Super Mario World, star Walker Boone as Mario and Tony Rosato as Luigi.

Mario is portrayed by Bob Hoskins in the 1993 film loosely based on the Super Mario series, Super Mario Bros. In the film, he is the cynical older brother who takes great pride in being a plumber and is a parental figure to Luigi, portrayed by John Leguizamo. At first, he held no belief in unusual things happening, but meeting Daisy and taking a trip to Dinohattan soon changed his mind. Hoskins was ultimately cast to play the character after other choices fell out, such as Dustin Hoffman and Danny DeVito. Hoskins had previously done multiple roles in children's films and kept suggesting changes to the script before he agreed to portray the character. According to one of the films' directors, Annabel Jankel, Hoskins was mainly considered due to his physical appearances. In subsequent interviews, Hoskins considered the role his worst choice in his acting career, admitted to constantly drinking before and during filming, and noted that he was injured and almost died multiple times during production.

Mario is voiced by Chris Pratt in the 2023 film adaptation The Super Mario Bros. Movie and the 2026 film adaptation The Super Mario Galaxy Movie. Although American actor Sebastian Maniscalco originally auditioned to voice Mario in the 2023 film, he got the role of voicing Spike instead. The film depicts him and Luigi as Italian-American plumbers who started their own business in Brooklyn after working for the antagonistic Foreman Spike, who supervises the Wrecking Crew. They attempt to fix a significant manhole leak reported in the news to make a name for themselves, only for the pipe to transport Mario to the Mushroom Kingdom and Luigi to the Dark Lands. Mario works with Peach, Toad, and later Donkey Kong to rescue Luigi and the Mushroom Kingdom from the tyrannical Bowser. Martinet makes cameo appearances in the film as Mario and Luigi's unnamed father and as Giuseppe, who appears in Brooklyn and resembles Mario's original design from Donkey Kong, speaking in his in-game voice. In response to criticism of Pratt's casting, co-director Aaron Horvath explained that he was cast mainly because of his history of playing good-natured, blue collar-type protagonists.

== Reception ==
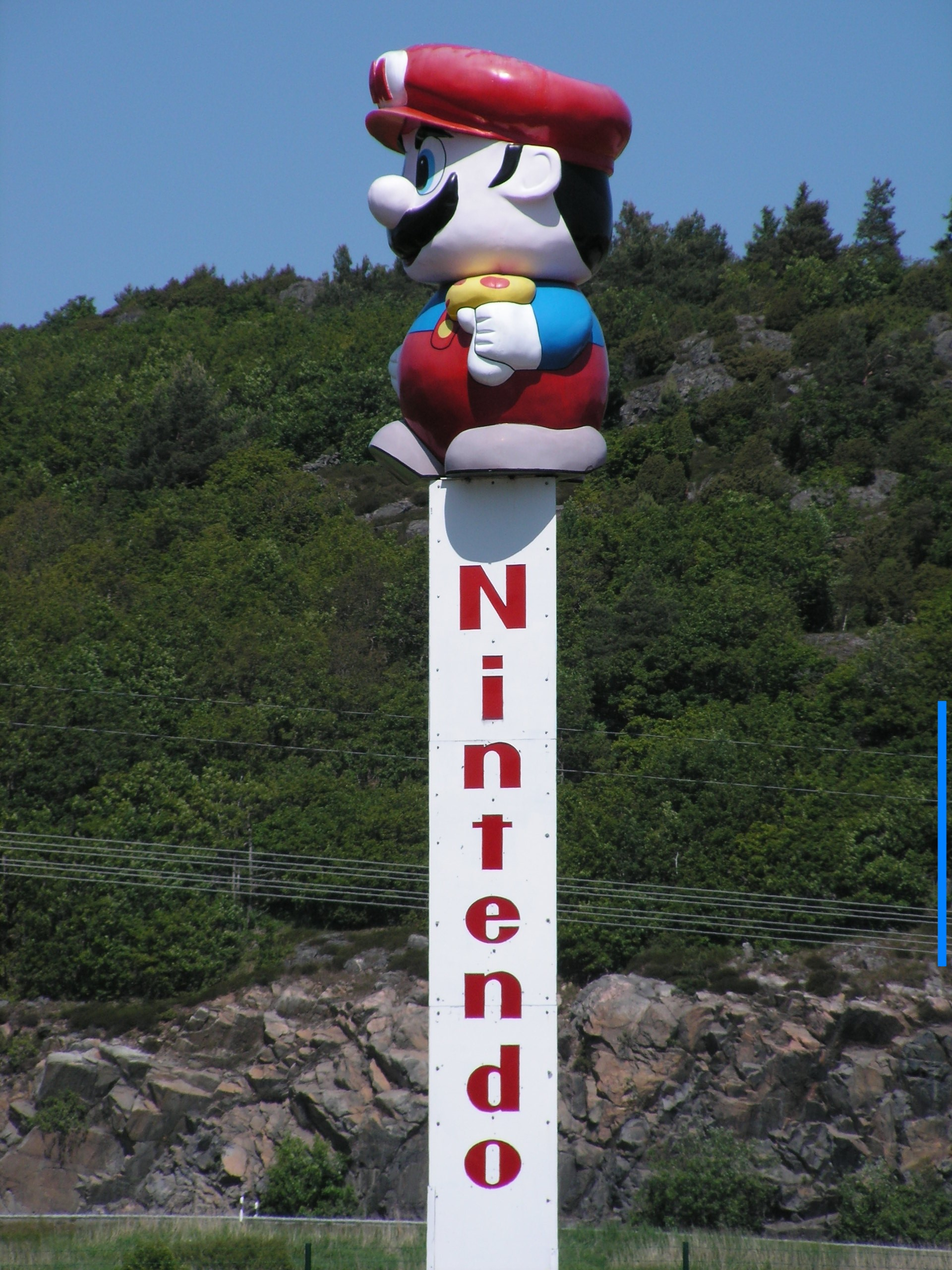
Statue of Mario in front of the offices of Nintendo's Nordic distributor Bergsala in Kungsbacka, Sweden

As Nintendo's mascot, Mario is widely considered to be the most famous video game character in history, and has been called an icon of the gaming industry. He has been featured in over two hundred video games. Mario was one of the first video game character inductees at the Walk of Game in 2005, alongside Link and Sonic the Hedgehog. Mario was the first video game character to be honored with a wax figure in the Hollywood Wax Museum in 2003. Kotaku writer Luke Plunkett had called Mario the most recognizable figure in the gaming industry, stating that, "Nintendo's mascot has been the most recognizable (and profitable) face this industry has ever - and will likely ever - see, almost single-handedly driving Nintendo through five whole generations of video game success". In 2010, Guinness World Records gave Mario the title "Godfather of gaming" and "longest-running computer game character" and stated, "Mario is still 'The Godfather' of gaming as the most successful and enduring character in an industry which is constantly evolving." In 2024, a poll conducted by BAFTA with around 4,000 respondents named Mario as the second most iconic video-game character of all time. Ben Lindbergh of The Ringer described Mario as "the most iconic video character of all time", "the medium's most successful character", and "video-game-character equivalent of type-O blood" and also reported that Mario has the highest Q Score among video game characters, with Link, Pac-Man, and Master Chief being some of his closest competitors. Lucas M. Thomas of IGN defined Mario as "gaming's greatest athlete", noting, "He's too short, he's out of shape and he's wearing entirely the wrong kind of shoes, but somehow Nintendo's main man Mario has still managed to become gaming's greatest athlete. From the tennis court to the ballpark, from the soccer field to the golf course, the heroic plumber has spent years now filling the time in-between his princess-rescuing adventures with a grand variety of leisurely sports".

In 1990, a national survey found that Mario was more recognizable to American children than Mickey Mouse. James Coates of The Baltimore Sun reported that, as author David Sheff notes, "In 1990, according to ‘Q’ ratings, Mario has become more popular than Mickey Mouse with American children" and he further mentions that his 9-year-old son is a Nintendo fan who is curious about what Mario is doing to the youth of America. In 2005, American musician Jonathan Mann created an opera based on Super Mario Bros. and performed Mario Opera as a tribute to Shigeru Miyamoto. Salman Rushdie, an Indian-born British-American novelist, was fond of Mario and his younger twin brother Luigi. He also enjoyed playing Super Mario World, which gave him the impression of having an enjoyment of life in comparison to the rest of the world. In 2023, a survey was taken by gaming website Cribbage Online on "Top 20 most-loved "Super Mario" franchise characters", which consisted of over 87,000 voters. According to the survey, Mario was placed third with 5,602 votes, while Luigi and Yoshi surpassed him with 5,771 votes and 6,084 votes, respectively.

Cameron Sherrill of Esquire praised Mario's athletic skills in track and field, noting, "This is where Mario comes to life. I mean, he goes against the blue guy who's literally famous for going fast. Plus, Mario is the platforming king—i.e. running and jumping—so it stands to reason that he'd be good at track and field". Philip Kollar and Allegra Frank of Polygon wrote in their review of Super Mario Odyssey that Mario plays an important role in making the game more pleasurable and special. They also wrote about Mario's legacy, stating that, "From a plumber to a doctor to a tennis star to, uh, a Goomba, Mario has endured. No, this will not be the last Mario game, but it is almost certain to be lauded as one of his best". Electronic Gaming Monthly gave Mario their "Coolest Mascot" award for 1996, calling him "an age-old friend". Nintendo Power listed Mario as their favorite hero, citing his defining characteristics as his mustache, red cap, plumbing prowess, and his mushrooms. In a poll conducted in 2008 by Oricon, Mario was voted as the most popular video game character in Japan by both men and women, overtaking popular video game icons such as Final Fantasy's Cloud Strife and Metal Gear's Solid Snake. Yahoo! Japan held a poll between November 1, 2009, and October 31, 2010, to determine which video game character is more popular among readers. Mario won the poll with 9,862 votes. Several publications have often compared Mario to Sega's mascot and iconic character, Sonic the Hedgehog. Mario also serves as an inspiration for Sonic the Hedgehog's origin.

== Legacy ==
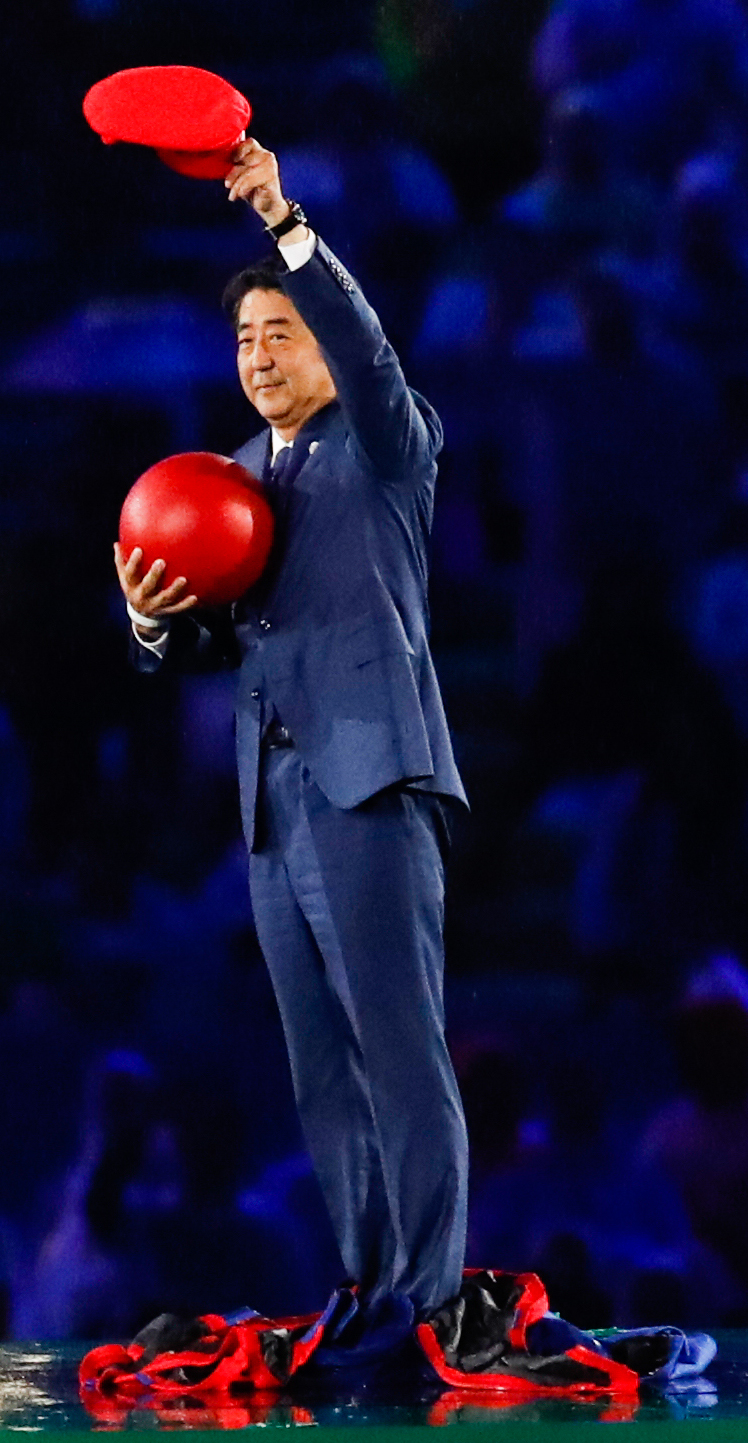
Japanese prime minister Shinzo Abe was dressed as Mario at the 2016 Summer Olympics closing ceremony.

Mario has been established as a pop culture icon and has appeared on lunch boxes, T-shirts, magazines, and commercials (notably in a Got Milk? commercial). Other products include cartoon shows, movies, books, hats, plush dolls, cereals, ice cream, bedding, kitchenware, clocks, purses, cufflinks, wallets, mugs, art prints, boxers, Lego sets, coaster sets, Hot Wheels sets, stationery sets, and board games. Pikachu, the mascot of the Pokémon media franchise, has been featured in a merchandise collection called "Mario Pikachu", which depicts Pikachu in Mario's outfit.

Mario has inspired unlicensed paintings, performances on talent shows such as India's Got Talent, short films, and web series. The character has been present in a number of works created by third parties other than Nintendo, such as in the iOS and Android video game Platform Panic, in which one of the purchasable skins is a reference to him. Assassin's Creed II, an action-adventure video game created by Ubisoft, features a reference to the Super Mario series. The game's protagonist, Ezio Auditore da Firenze, gets attacked on the road; his uncle saves him and introduces himself by saying Mario's iconic catchphrase, "It's a-me, Mario!" World of Warcraft, a massively multiplayer online role-playing game created by Blizzard Entertainment, features two non-playable characters named Muigin and Larion, who are references to Mario and Luigi. It also features a jumpbot that resembles Mario's appearance.

Many people and places have been named or nicknamed after Mario. Bergsala, the distributor of Nintendo's products in the Nordic and the Baltic countries, is located at Marios Gata 21 (Mario's Street 21) in Kungsbacka, Sweden, named after Mario. Many sports stars, including Bundesliga football players Mario Götze and Mario Gómez, National Hockey League player Mario Lemieux, Italian footballer Mario Balotelli, Italian cyclist Mario Cipollini, and American former footballer Mario Williams have been given the nickname "Super Mario". In a suburb of the Spanish city of Zaragoza, streets were named after video games, including "Avenida de Super Mario Bros."

Mario's legacy is recognized by Guinness World Records, who awarded the Nintendo mascot, and the series of platform games he has appeared in, seven world records in the Guinness World Records: Gamer's Edition 2008. These records include "Best Selling Video Game Series of All Time", "First Movie Based on an Existing Video Game", and "Most Prolific Video Game Character", with Mario appearing in 116 original games. In 2009, Guinness World Records listed him as the second most recognizable video game character in the United States, recognized by 93 percent of the population, second only to Pac-Man, who was recognized by 94 percent of the population. In 2011, readers of Guinness World Records Gamer's Edition voted Mario as the top video game character of all time. In 2018, Charles Martinet, voice actor of Mario, received the Guinness World Record for most video game voice-over performances as the same character.

Mario appeared in the 2016 Summer Olympics closing ceremony to promote the 2020 Summer Olympics in Tokyo. In a pre-recorded video, the prime minister Shinzo Abe became Mario to use a Warp pipe planted by Doraemon from Shibuya Crossing to Maracanã Stadium. Abe then appeared dressed as Mario in an oversized Warp Pipe in the middle of the stadium. This segment was favorably well received as playful and tasteful in Japan, resulting in giving Abe the nickname "Abe-Mario".

Mario Day is celebrated on March 10, as when that date is presented as Mar 10 it resembles the word "Mario". Since 2016 the day has been officially observed by Nintendo, who celebrates the day annually by promoting Mario games and holding Mario-related events. In March 2018, Google Maps collaborated with Nintendo for the celebration of Mario Day. By tapping on a yellow ? Block, the navigation arrow changes into Mario, who drives his Pipe Frame kart from the Mario Kart series. In March 2024, American actor Gaten Matarazzo teamed up with Nintendo to celebrate that year's Mario Day. For the celebration of Mario Day in 2026, GameStop hosts a promotional event at its Manhattan store located at 32 East 14th Street in New York City. The event takes place on March 10 from 4:00 p.m. to 8:00 p.m. In the event, participants gather and dress as Mario in an attempt to set a world record for the largest gathering of individuals wearing Mario's costume. Each participant receives a $5 bonus for taking part in the event.

A Mario balloon was featured as part of the 2025 Macy's Thanksgiving Day Parade. Designed in a pose reminiscent to how he flies in Super Mario Galaxy, Nintendo of America's EVP of revenue, marketing, and consumer experience Devon Pritchard stated that the decision for Mario to join the parade was "to honour the 40th anniversary of Super Mario Bros.".

In 2026, Nintendo revealed a product line dedicated to Mario titled "My Mario", designed for infants and toddlers, launching in the United States in February 2026 following its earlier release in Japan the previous year. The initial wave of products debuts on February 19 at Nintendo's New York and San Francisco stores and features Mario-themed wooden block sets, board books, apparel, plush toys, clothes, and the Hello, Mario! app, available on Nintendo Switch, Nintendo Switch 2, and mobile devices. Nintendo planned to expand the My Mario lineup over time with additional Mario-focused games, clothing, and apps, including collaborations with toy companies such as Fisher-Price and Tomy. The brand also extends into digital media with a short stop-motion animated series starring Mario, consisting of five one-minute episodes.

== See also ==
- List of Mario franchise characters
