= Pokémon Friends =

2025 video game

- Promotional poster
- Developers: Wonderfy; The Pokémon Company; h.a.n.d.
- Publishers: The Pokémon Company (Note: Mobile versions); Nintendo (Note: Nintendo Switch version)
- Series: Pokémon
- Platforms: Android; iOS; Nintendo Switch
- Release: July 22, 2025
- Genre: Puzzle game
- Mode: Single-player

Pokémon Friends is a 2025 spin-off mobile game in the Pokémon franchise. The game takes the form of a puzzle game, in which the player has to solve a variety of puzzles. These puzzles reward the player with yarn items, which are able to be used to craft plushes, which then can either be used to decorate an in-game room, or as gifts to residents of an in-game town.

Pokémon Friends was developed by the company Wonderfy in collaboration with The Pokémon Company, with Wonderfy having previously worked on various educational properties and games. Friends was created with the goal of being an educational and relaxing experience for the player, particularly for children. First revealed in July 2025 during a Pokémon Presents presentation, the game was released shortly afterward on mobile devices and the Nintendo Switch. Though the game is free to play on mobile devices, additional downloadable content packs are able to be purchased that expand the numbers of puzzles and gameplay options available.

Pokémon Friends received mixed reviews from critics. Though many believed the game to be a fun experience, other critics disliked the requirement to purchase additional downloadable content packs to obtain everything present within the game.

== Gameplay ==
An example of a puzzle in the game, in which the player must line up lightbulbs with one line

Pokémon Friends is a free-to-play puzzle game, where the player is tasked with solving a variety of puzzles. For example, some puzzles include a tile-based mode where the player must draw a line connecting a series of lightbulbs, while another has the player slide blocks to create a path for Pokémon to move. The player can solve a series of daily puzzles, which will be marked down on an in-game calendar upon completion. While many puzzles are based on common puzzle types, there are many that are uniquely based around the Pokémon series. Over 1,200 puzzles were made available at launch, and are available in a number of difficulty options. Limits can be placed by players on the number of puzzles playable in a day, and up to five save files can be created, allowing for multiple people have individual playthroughs on one copy of the game. The game has been considered a puzzle game similar to both the Professor Layton and Big Brain Academy series.

By completing puzzles in the game, the player can earn yarn items. The amount of yarn depends on how quickly the player solved puzzles. This yarn can be used to craft in-game plushes of Pokémon species. Depending on the type of yarn that is obtained, different plushes can be created. The player can use these plushes, alongside a variety of furniture, to decorate their in-game room. After obtaining a given plush, they are registered to an in-game catalog, where the player can view the plush and a description of the species they are based on at any time. Around 150 plushes are available in-game. Plushes can also be given to residents of the game's setting, Think Town, which is stated to be a major plush creator in the Pokémon universe.

== Development and release ==
The game was developed by the company Wonderfy in collaboration with The Pokémon Company. The company is an education-focused company and had previously developed other educational games. Previous educational games in the series include the 2020 toothbrushing game Pokémon Smile and the 2023 sleeping game Pokémon Sleep. All of the game's puzzles were developed in-house, with an aim being relaxing to a wide age range of players. Wonderfy stated that they hoped this game would have an educational benefit for the player, particularly children. According to Wonderfy's CEO and COO, Kei Kawashima, the target audience for the game is around five years old. The game was also developed by H.a.n.d.

Pokémon Friends was first revealed on July 22, 2025 during a Pokémon Presents presentation. The game was released immediately after the presentation on iOS, Android, and Nintendo Switch devices. Prior to the game's release, a trial event was held for the media that allowed them to review it in advance. While the mobile release of the game is free, the Nintendo Switch release of the game has to be paid for. The Switch release contains a basic set of puzzles available from the start, with more available for purchase, while the mobile version only allows for one puzzle to be played a day, with the puzzles being playable again a certain amount of time after the previous one. The mobile version has additional downloadable content (DLC) available for purchase which unlocks additional features. One DLC pack allows the player to play as many puzzles as they like, while other DLC packs include additional puzzles, wallpaper for their room, and more. Shortly after the game's release, it topped the free games list on the Japanese iPhone App Store. A free update was added to the game on December 2, 2025 which added new puzzles, plushes, and furniture items to the game.

== Reception ==
Reception

Aggregate scores
Aggregator	Score
Metacritic	62/100
OpenCritic	8% recommended

Review scores
Publication	Score
Hardcore Gamer	3.5/5
Nintendo Life	5/10
Siliconera	7/10
Multiplayer.it	5/10

Pokémon Friends received "mixed or average" reviews from critics, according to the review aggregation website Metacritic. Fellow review aggregator OpenCritic assessed that the game received weak approval, being recommended by 8% of critics.

Automaton's TEA CAN highlighted the game as a fun experience for those who enjoyed puzzle games. Real Sound also enjoyed the puzzle solving experience, and praised the plush feature present in the game. Continental New Order, writing for 4Gamer.net, believed the game to be worth a try for all types of players, not just the game's target audience. Jenni Lada, writing for Siliconera, believed to be a fun experience when played in short bursts daily. Famitsu's Giant Kuroda highlighted the game's "intuitive" puzzle system, believing it to be an especially good game for children.

Kenneth Shepard, writing for Kotaku, highlighted the game's gameplay as well as its plush mechanic, but was critical of its paywalls, believing that the game was not worth the cost required to access it fully. Nintendo Life's Lowell Bell believed the puzzle gameplay to be fun, but that it quickly grew stale and was overpriced given the level of actual content in the game. Giovanni Colantonio, writing for Polygon, stated that the game's microtransactions and gacha-esque plush system made him wary about the game, as he believed it could encourage negative behaviors present in players of gacha games. Inverse's Hayes Madsden felt the game was bogged down by the amount of purchases required for a complete experience.
