= Mario Segale =

American businessman (1934–2018)

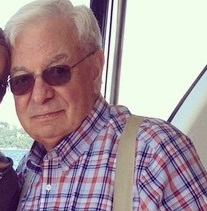
- Segale in 2016
- Born: Mario Arnold Segale; April 30, 1934; Seattle, Washington, U.S.
- Died: October 27, 2018 (aged 84); Tukwila, Washington, U.S.
- Occupations: Businessman; real estate developer
- Years active: 1950–2018
- Known for: Namesake of Mario
- Spouses: Donna Segale (m. 1957)
- Children: 4

Mario Arnold Segale (April 30, 1934 – October 27, 2018) was an Italian-American businessman and real estate developer. He was involved in various development projects in the Seattle area from the 1950s onwards. Nintendo's mascot, Mario, was named after Segale while he was leasing a warehouse to Nintendo.

== Business career ==
Segale was born in Seattle on April 30, 1934, to two Italian immigrants, Louis (born Luigi Maria Segale; died 1981) and Rina Segale, and was their only child. Luigi was born in 1886 in Favale di Malvaro, near Genoa, to a family whose father was a bricklayer. In 1909, Luigi and his brother, Giuseppe, sailed to Ellis Island, before traveling to Tukwila, Washington, south of Seattle. Luigi anglicized his forename to Louis and served the US military in 1918 during World War I. Louis was honorably discharged a year later and his family made a living through farming vegetables. The Segales bought a home in Seattle at the start of the US's post–World War II economic expansion. Louis and Rina Segale later earned recognition from the Catholic Northwest Progress newspaper for their support of children enrolled in the archdiocese of Seattle's foster program. The Guardian noted that Louis's story "echoed those of 4 million Italians grappling with economic hardship and political upheaval who immigrated to the US over a 35-year period beginning in 1880."

Mario Segale graduated from Highline High School in 1952 and started a construction company with a single truck in 1957, the same year that he married his wife Donna. The couple worked to develop a privately owned asphalt and construction business, M. A. Segale Inc., which grew into a major regional contractor and was sold for $60 million in 1998 to Irish concern CRH plc, for integration into its Oldcastle Materials unit. In 1978, the company was awarded a contract to construct a section of Interstate 82 near Prosser, Washington.

Segale and his son Mark were involved in other ventures, including real estate investments in the Seattle area. His company sold the land rights to the Emerald Downs racetrack in Auburn to the Muckleshoot tribe in 1996 for $73.6 million. Segale was also heavily involved in Tukwila-area projects, including a 490-acre (2.0 km^{2}) development project called Tukwila South in the 2010s.

== Political activities ==
A 2004 study by the Seattle Times found that Segale was one of the top 50 political contributors in the state of Washington. Overall, Mario and Mark Segale donated more than $90,000 to Democratic Party candidates and organizations between 2000 and 2007. Some of these contributions were to elected officials who worked to secure state legislative earmarks for roads in a privately owned development proposed by a Segale company.

== Nintendo character ==
The video game company Nintendo began renting one of Segale's Tukwila warehouses in 1981 for use as their American headquarters. According to a widely circulated story first published in David Sheff's 1993 book Game Over, during development of the arcade game Donkey Kong, Segale visited the warehouse to collect overdue rent from Nintendo of America president Minoru Arakawa and berated him in front of employees. However, Segale gave them time to come up with the money for rent, and Arakawa and the other developers subsequently renamed the Donkey Kong player character to Mario, who was previously known as Jumpman. This story is contradicted by former Nintendo of America warehouse manager Don James, who stated in 2012 that he and Arakawa named the character after Segale as a joke because Segale was so reclusive that none of the employees had ever met him. James repeated this account in 2018.

Due to a spelling error in Sheff's Game Over, for years it was thought that Segale's last name was spelled "Segali". Sheff's story of the naming of Mario later appeared in Steven L. Kent's The Ultimate History of Video Games in 2001, and thereafter spread widely on the internet. Mario's creator, Shigeru Miyamoto, confirmed in 2015 that Mario was indeed named after Segale, without specifying the story behind the naming.

Segale was unamused by his link to the character and was "infamously press-shy". He told The Seattle Times in 1993, "You might say I'm still waiting for my royalty checks."

== Death ==
Segale died on October 27, 2018, at his home in Tukwila, aged 84. His obituary said that he "always ducked the notoriety" that came with being the character's namesake and "wanted to be known instead for what he accomplished in his life". He was survived by four children—Lisa Atkins, Mark Segale, Tina Covey, and Nita Johnson—and nine grandchildren.
