= Game Builder Garage =

2021 video game

- Home menu icon
- Developer: Nintendo EPD
- Publisher: Nintendo
- Director: Naoki Masuda
- Programmer: Naoki Masuda
- Platform: Nintendo Switch
- Release: June 11, 2021
- Genre: Programming
- Modes: Single-player, multiplayer

Game Builder Garage (Note: Japanese: ナビつき! つくってわかる はじめてゲームプログラミング, Hepburn: Nabi-tsuki! Tsukutte Wakaru Hajimete Gēmu Puroguramingu) is a 2021 programming video game developed and published by Nintendo for the Nintendo Switch. Released on June 11, 2021, it is a spin-off of the Nintendo Labo series, which included a mode with similar gameplay titled Toy-Con Garage.

Gameplay involves placing and connecting Nodon: colorful characters which represent distinct computer functions and controller inputs. There are three different game modes, including interactive lessons where players build themed games, free programming mode where players build as they please, and a set of tutorials called "Alice's Guide" to teach players about the different Nodon.

== Gameplay ==
In Game Builder Garage, the player uses a visual programming language centralized on the concept of creatures called Nodon. The Nodon represent various facets of input, game output, logic, and on-screen objects, such as a Stick Nodon that reports input from the Joy-Con analog stick or a Person Nodon that represents an on-screen character. The player builds a program by adding Nodon and making connections between the various nodes on Nodon, such as connecting the Stick Nodon to the Person Nodon as to tie the analog stick to movement of the character on-screen. Nodon are available to interface nearly all features of the Switch and Joy-Con, including the infrared sensors and motion controls.

The game features a lesson mode to guide the player through using the Nodon language and to help them understand some of the principles of game development through a series of seven built-in games that the player can create.

Games built within Game Builder Garage can support up to eight different Joy-Con, effectively allowing up to eight-player local multiplayer games to be built.

Game Builder Garage has a share function, that allows creators to upload their games and share them with other people. Unlike other Nintendo titles with similar features (e.g. Super Mario Maker), which have user interfaces for shared games, a game's code has to be shared by the creator for other people to access it. Game codes are formatted in the format of a G, followed by 9 random letters or numbers, for example, G 004 WXX 5ND. Fans of the game have created their own platforms for sharing their games; the most popular one is MyGarage Games.

The game also allows for the use of commercial USB computer mice. Joy-Con 2's mouse mode is also supported when playing on the Nintendo Switch 2 through backwards compatibility, though certain Nodon will be unavailable due to Joy-Con 2 lacking the IR sensor present in the original Joy-Con.

== Development ==
The game was announced on May 5, 2021, being released on June 11, 2021. Game Builder Garage was developed specifically by Nintendo EPD 4, the division behind games like Nintendo Labo, Ring Fit Adventure, 1-2-Switch, Miitopia and many more. The game was directed by Naoki Masuda, a programmer at Nintendo who had previously worked on Nintendo Labo and the Pikmin series.

In a developer interview, Masuda and programmer Kosuke Teshima described the Nintendo Labo series, particularly the VR Kit, as a key inspiration for Game Builder Garage. After seeing non-programmer Nintendo employees using the Toy-Con Garage to create their own games, Masuda described that he wanted to "find a way to make it easier for people to have the fun of creating games through trial and error." The developers tested the game on elementary school students interested in programming to ensure the lessons were accessible to beginners.

== Reception ==
Reception

Aggregate score
Aggregator	Score
Metacritic	77/100

Review scores
Publication	Score
Destructoid	6.5/10
Eurogamer	Recommended
GameSpot	7/10
IGN	8/10
Nintendo Life	7/10
PCMag	4.5/5
Shacknews	7/10
The Guardian	4/5
VG247	4/5

Game Builder Garage received "generally favorable" reviews according to review aggregator website Metacritic. Nintendo Life's Alex Olney praised the game's tutorials, but criticized the lack of visual options given to players. IGN's Seth Macy enjoyed the amount of options and tools the game gives to players. Game Builder Garage was described by Polygon as a followup to Nintendo Labo. It was also the bestselling retail game during its first week of release in Japan, with 71,241 physical copies being sold across the country. As of December 31, 2022, Game Builder Garage had sold 1.15 million units in total worldwide.

Creators have recreated several notable games using the software, including recreations of Super Mario Kart, F-Zero, and Sonic the Hedgehog.
