= Nintendo Labo =

Video game series

Variety Kit, Robot Kit, Vehicle Kit, and VR Kit
- Publishers: Nintendo
- Publication: WW: April 20, 2018; EU: April 27, 2018
- Systems: Nintendo Switch
- Materials required: Cardboard construction set, craft materials
- Media type: Nintendo Switch game card
- Slogan: Make, Play, Discover
- Website: labo.nintendo.com

Nintendo Labo (Note: Japanese: ニンテンドーラボ, Hepburn: Nintendō Rabo) was a series of toys-to-life video games developed and published by Nintendo for the Nintendo Switch. Gameplay consists of players constructing Toy-Cons from kits that include cardboard cut-outs and other materials in combination with the console and Joy-Con controllers, which can interact with the included game software and vice versa. Labo was designed to teach children principles of engineering and basic programming.

== Gameplay ==
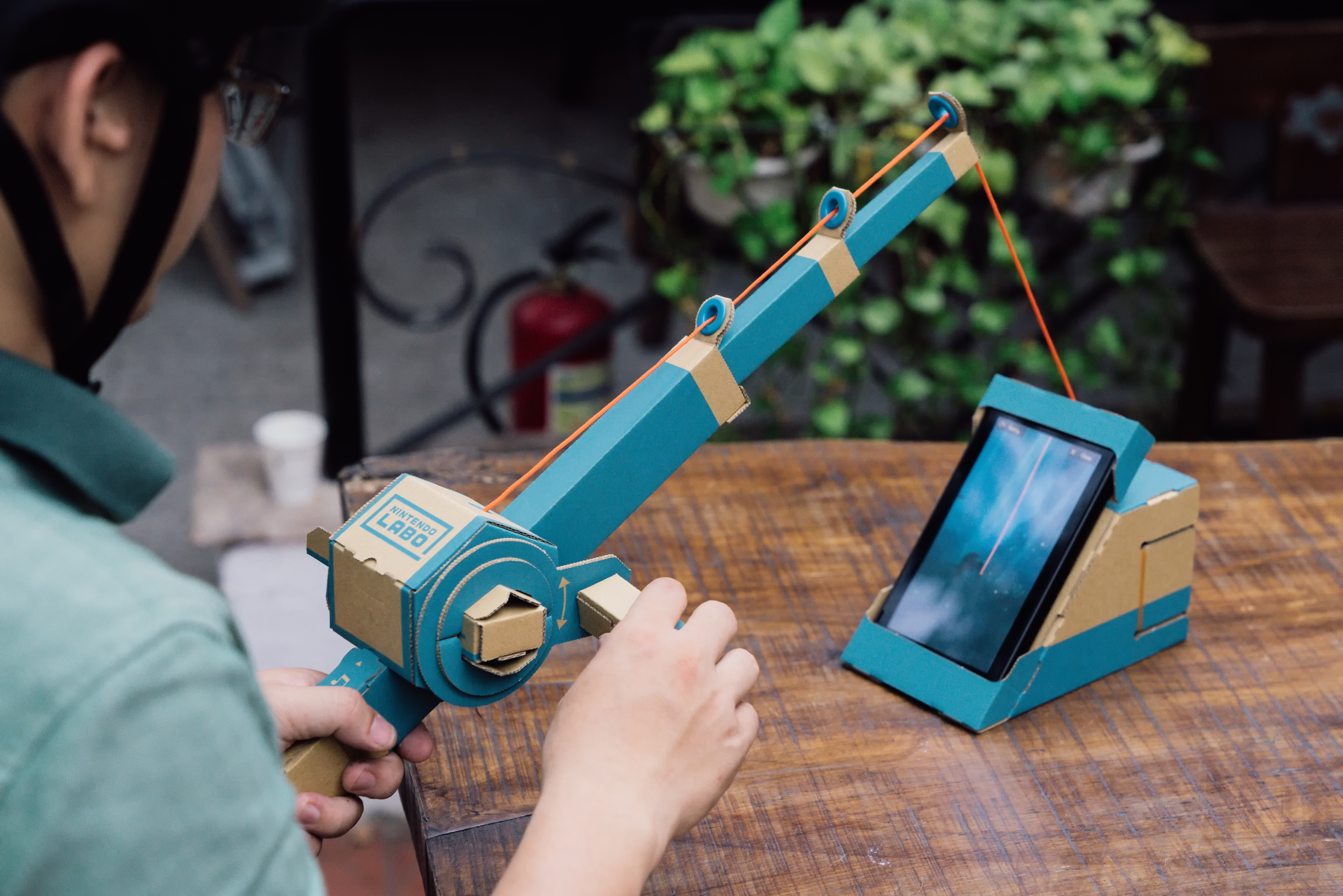
The fishing rod Toy-Con interacting with the Switch console (encased on the right side of the image). Joy-Con are placed inside the handle and the reel of the rod.

Nintendo Labo is released as individual Labo Kits, each containing a set of pre-made cardboard cut-outs and other materials, used to make one or more "Toy-Con", and a Nintendo Switch game card, which contains interactive instructions on how to assemble the Toy-Con and software that the Toy-Con can interact with. Once each Toy-Con is constructed, players insert the main Nintendo Switch display and/or one or both of the Joy-Con controllers according to the instructions. Each Toy-Con functions differently in the ways it interacts with either the Joy-Con or the main display. For example, the piano Toy-Con's keystrokes are read by the Right Joy-Con controller's infrared sensor to identify notes being played, while robotic Toy-Con move using HD Rumble from the Joy-Con controllers, which are controlled via the touchscreen. Players may freely decorate the cardboard parts using coloring pens, tape, and other materials, while more experienced users can invent new ways to play with each Toy-Con. The game software provides instructions on how the Toy-Con works with the Switch, such as describing the fundamentals of infrared sensing.

=== Kits ===
Two Labo Kits, Variety Kit and Robot Kit, were announced for launch in North America, Australia, and Japan on April 20, 2018, and in Europe on April 27, 2018. An accessory set containing stencils, stickers, and tape are available separately. Replacement packs for individual parts and Toy-Con are available for purchase on Nintendo's online store, while free templates for the cardboard cut-outs are also available for download. While Nintendo did not confirm any additional Toy-Con kits at launch, journalists observed that other Toy-Con configurations were shown in the announce trailer, suggesting that additional kits may be announced at a later date.

==== Variety Kit ====
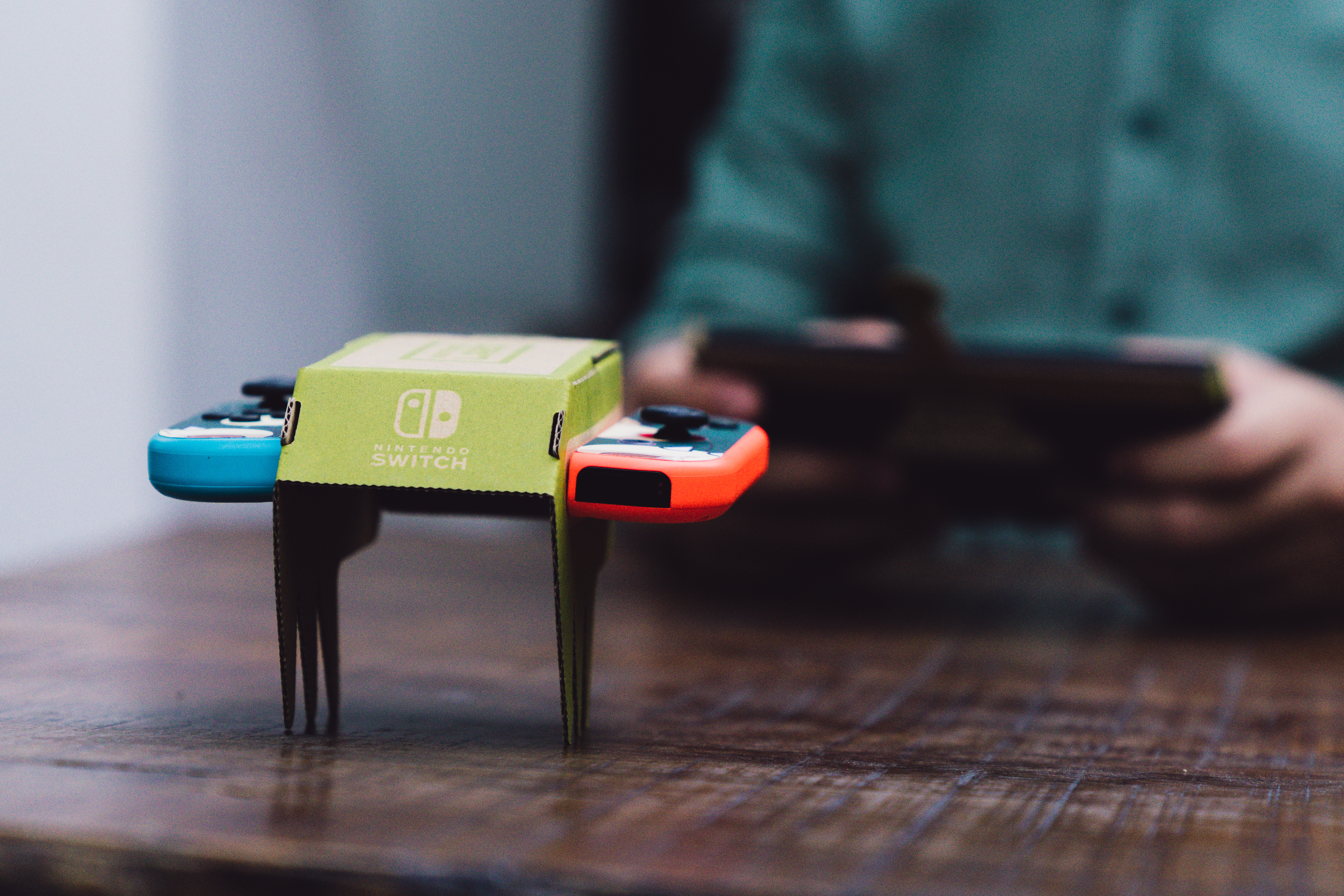
The remote-controlled "car" Toy-Con, with the two Joy-Con attached to the sides and controlled by the Switch console (held by the person in the background)

The Variety Kit contains kits for five individual Toy-Con:

- Two remote-controlled cars, where the vibrations from the Joy-Con serve to provide momentum and steering to the car. The game software allows the player to control the car like a normal remote-controlled vehicle using the console itself as the controller. The software also allows for the car to follow targets using the IR motion camera of the right Joy-Con.
- A fishing rod where the Joy-Con sit in the reel and the handle of the rod. The game receives motion input from the Joy-Con to simulate a fishing game.
- A toy piano with a full octave of keys; the console sits atop this to serve as a music stand.
- A motorbike with Joy-Con inserted into the handlebars on either side of the Console for steering. The Toy-Con Motorbike is also compatible as a motion controller in Mario Kart 8 Deluxe and in Moto Rush GT.
- A house containing a slot to insert different components that can interact with the game software on the Console's display.

The kit comes with a game cartridge that contains interactive instructions of how to assemble each Toy-Con, and at least one software package to use the Toy-Con. Some Toy-Con have multiple programs; for example, the motorbike handles allow the player to race along a track in stunt bikes, and gives the player the ability to create new track layouts, or to use any object detected through the IR sensor to create a track based on that object. Similar IR sensing abilities allows the player to create new fish to catch in the fishing rod Toy-Con, or to create new waveforms to use on the piano Toy-Con.

==== Robot Kit ====
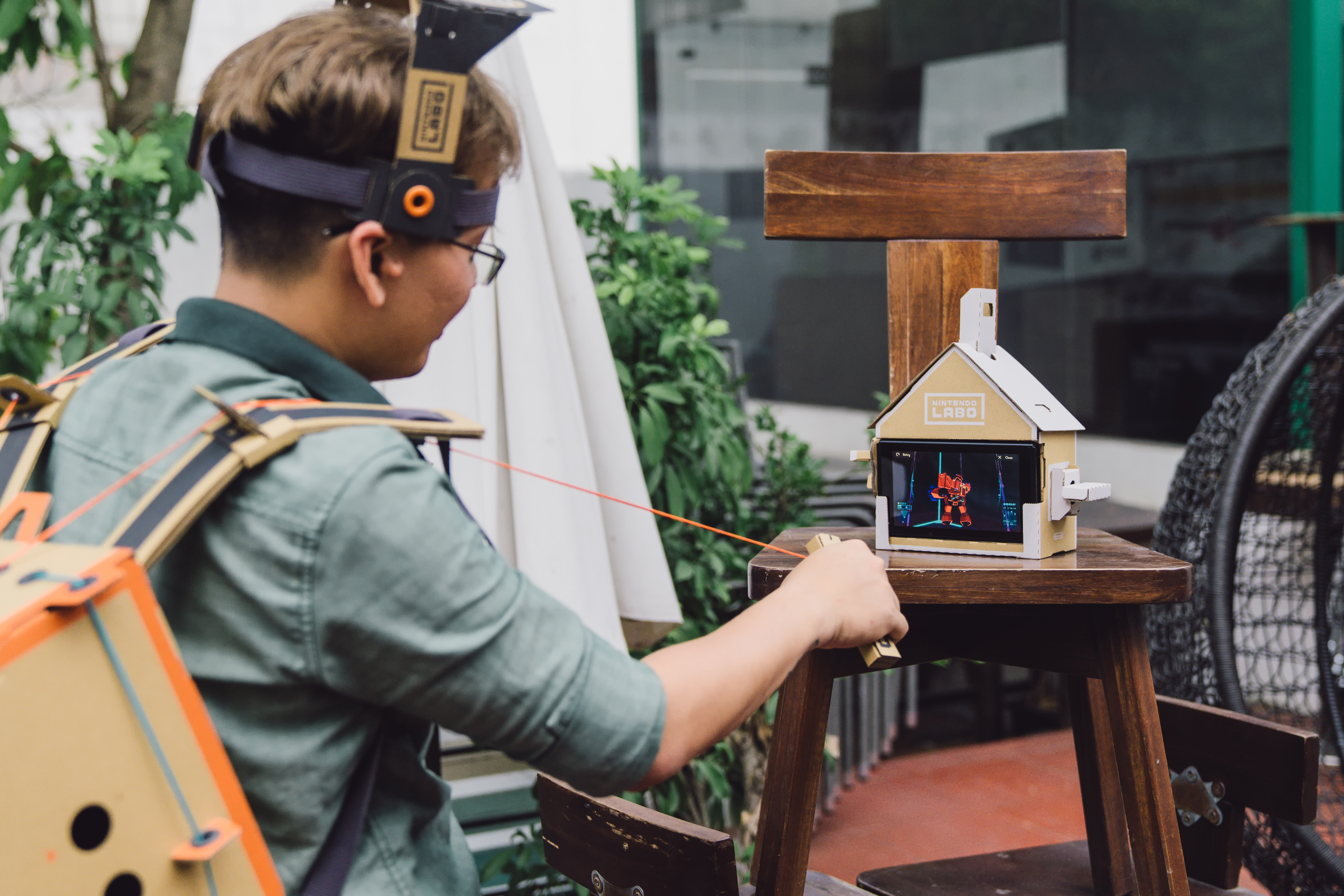
A user using the Robot kit to interact with the game on the Switch unit (right)

The Robot Kit includes parts to make a mecha suit that includes a visor which holds the left Joy-Con for motion sensing and a backpack that holds the right Joy-Con to read hand and feet swings. This allows the player to rampage through a virtual world presented on the screen. The software includes multiple game-modes: Robot, VS, Challenge, Robo-Studio, and the Hangar. Robot mode gives the player the ability to control the giant robot as it attacks targets across a cityscape, to control the robot as it flies over a city, and to transform in a tank. The two-player VS mode allows players to fight with their giant robots, though both players need a separate Robot Toy-Con for this mode. In Challenge Mode, the player can complete missions to unlock special abilities that can be used in the game's other modes. The Robo-Studio mode allows the player to insert the Console into the Toy-Con and play sound effects based on the player's movement, while the Hanger allows the player to customize the color and appearance of their virtual robot.

Journalists noted similarities between this Kit and Project Giant Robot, a software title for the Wii U that had players use the motion sensing of the Wii U GamePad to control a robot and rampage through a city. Project Giant Robot was teased during E3 2014 and believed to be tied to Star Fox Zero, but was ultimately cancelled by Nintendo. Labo developers stated in an interview that the original prototype was a ground-based tank with interactive floor pedals, but risked being crushed by the user and did not utilize the potential of the Joy-Con's gyro sensor; to solve these issues, the prototype was modified to be worn as a "Carry-Con" on the user's back.

==== Vehicle Kit ====
Nintendo announced its first post-release Labo Kit in July 2018, which was released worldwide on September 14, 2018. The Vehicle Kit includes the cardboard parts to make three steering consoles, one for a car, one for a plane, and one for a submarine, each with a slot for a "key" that is built around a Toy-Con. The associated game allows players to control cars, planes, and submarines in game, switching between these modes by moving their Toy-Con key between units, and supports cooperative play with a second person using another Toy-Con. The kit also includes cutouts for a pedal Toy-Con to power each of the vehicles, two key Toy-Con, a spray can Toy-Con, and a stand for the console to sit atop the car Toy-Con. Included with the spray can Toy-Con are several "extra parts" made to aid in the Paint Studio, the mode made for it.

==== VR Kit ====
Released on April 12, 2019, the VR Kit centers around a cardboard pair of virtual reality goggles that allows players to view stereoscopic 3D images using the Switch console, similar to Google Cardboard. The main kit comes with parts to make five items, each of which can be attached to the VR Goggles: a Blaster, a camera, a bird, an elephant head, and a pinwheel. The parts to build a Wind Pedal that blows wind when pressed is also included with the main kit. A starter kit containing only the VR Goggles, pinwheel, and Blaster attachment is also available, with the other attachments to be purchased separately. It is unique in being the only Nintendo Switch game to be wholly incompatible with the Nintendo Switch 2 via backwards compatibility, as the console is too big to fit into the goggles.

=== Toy-Con Garage ===
The Nintendo Labo software comes with a feature called "Toy-Con Garage", which allows users to create and program their own Toy-Con using simple programming commands, either starting with the available Labo kits, or with their own materials. Toy-Con Garage is based upon creating simple commands by connecting input and output nodes. When an input is performed, it will trigger the connected output event. Additional middle nodes can be added to modify the input. For example, an input node can be a specific button press or a controller movement, while the middle node can set a required number of presses in order for the output to occur. Output nodes range from vibrating the Joy-Con to lighting up the Console's display. Toy-Con Garage provides multiple options for customizing each node, such as adjusting the sensitivity and direction of the control stick as an input node. Multiple input-output commands can be used in combination to create more complex creations. In 2021, Nintendo released Game Builder Garage for the Nintendo Switch, which is largely based on Toy-Con Garage.

=== In other games ===
Following the release of Nintendo Labo, select software titles have received free updates giving them compatibility with certain Toy-Con. A free update to Mario Kart 8 Deluxe in June 2018 allowed players to use the motorbike Toy-Con from the Variety Kit, to control their racer in the game. In August 2018, Nintendo announced that the car steering wheel Toy-Con from the upcoming Vehicle Kit will also be compatible with Mario Kart 8 Deluxe. Nintendo updated The Legend of Zelda: Breath of the Wild and Super Mario Odyssey in April 2019 to support VR game modes through the VR Kit; the former allows for the entire game to be played with the headset, while the latter includes an exclusive mode for VR gameplay. A limited VR mode for Super Smash Bros. Ultimate where players can view battles via the headset was released the following month. The Nintendo Switch version of Captain Toad: Treasure Tracker received an update on July 30, 2019, that added a VR mode allowing the user to play four levels and get a 360° view of the course selection screen while using the Toy-Con VR Goggles. In February 2026, it was reported that Virtual Boy games played through the Nintendo Classics service would also compatible with the Labo VR Kit. While Nintendo stated that the headset was not officially supported, hands-on testing has found that the Labo headset is compatible with the Virtual Boy games. Similarly, the official headset accessories released for Nintendo Classics will also work with Labo VR compatible games.

Numerous games from third-party developers utilize the Toy-Cons' functions. After unveiling a tech demo in April 2018, in August 2018, Rayark announced that it would add a mode to its piano-based rhythm game Deemo in October 2018 to support the piano Toy-Con on selected songs, as the first third-party title to offer integration with one. In January 2019, it was announced that Gree's Fishing Star: World Tour would support the Toy-Con Fishing Rod in an issue of the Famitsu magazine. Baltoro Games' Moto Rush GT was released on April 19, 2019 with support for the Toy Con Motorbike. Puchikon 4 SmileBASIC released on May 23, 2019, in Japan with support for the Toy-Con Piano, House, Fishing Rod, Motorbike, and Robot kits that could be used in games made in the program. On May 27, 2019, Spice and Wolf VR was announced to utilize Toy-Con virtual reality due to the game's nature; it was released on September 5, 2019. Norain Games and Jandusoft's Neonwall was updated with Toy-Con virtual reality support in January 2020, amongst the first Western developers to utilize the feature. Codemasters and Feral Interactive's Grid Autosport added support for the Vehicle Kit in a July 30, 2020 update. Two Laid-Back Camp Virtual games released in 2021 included Labo VR support.

== Development ==
Labo was announced on January 17, 2018. The director is Tsubasa Sakaguchi and the producer is Kouichi Kawamoto. According to Nintendo of America president Reggie Fils-Aimé, "Labo is unlike anything we've done before", and was developed to extend the age-audience for the Switch. Nintendo said the product was "specifically crafted for kids and those who are kids at heart." The tagline for Labo is "Make, Play, Discover"; "Discover" refers to how the user of the Toy-Con can understand the fundamentals of physics, engineering, and programming that make the Toy-Con work through the act of making and playing with them. The product was not originally intended to be educational, though one of its goals was to "explain how the technology behind the Toy-Con creations works".

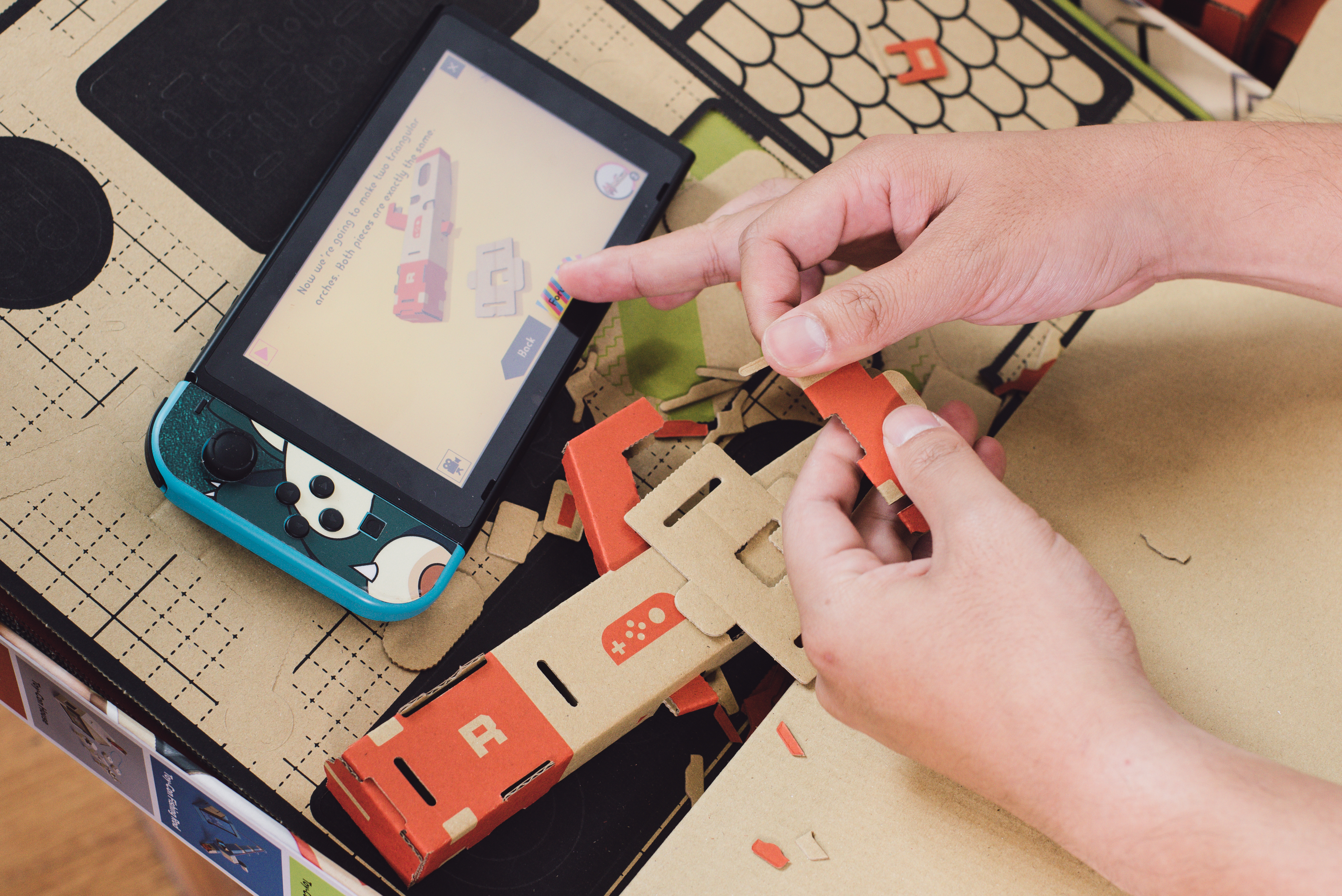
A Toy-Con being constructed from punch-outs from cardboard sheets with instructions via the Switch Labo software

The concept of Labo came from Nintendo when they asked their employees to come up with ways that the Switch's Joy-Con could be used; out of many potential ideas, the idea of building cardboard toys around the controllers held promise. According to Shinya Takahashi, the use of cardboard as part of playthings is common among Japanese children, and as they started prototyping ideas, they found the "trial and error" process of putting together the cardboard toys was "extremely fun". As the Labo concept was developed, they found it fit well within Nintendo's overall philosophy on innovating new ways to have fun, and had potential to introduce the Switch to more than just game enthusiasts.

Nintendo Labo developers Kawamoto, Sakaguchi, and Ogasawara stated in an interview that their goal was to use the unique features of the Nintendo Switch in such a way that no other system could emulate. The Joy-Con were treated as a "bundle of sensors" that could be used in a multitude of ways by attaching them to different hardware pieces, focusing on the gyro motion-sensor, IR motion camera, and HD Rumble features. The team was tasked with exploring Joy-Con attachment and game prototypes during three weeks of brainstorming sessions, called "prototype parties." When asked about the choice of building material, the developers responded by saying that cardboard was chosen over plastic because the 3D printer they were using for prototyping was unable to keep up with their pace of testing; cardboard would also allow for the player to create, repair, and customize the project themselves. The initial construction designs were first thought as being simple to construct, but later proved to be complex and challenging when it was decided that no cutting or gluing would be required to assemble the kits. Improvements were made to the prototypes based on feedback from consumer and developer testing; this prompted the creation of the interactive instruction software, as well as favoring simplicity over appearance. During development testing—prior to the cardboard designs being finalized—photographs were taken and compiled into booklets to be used as temporary instruction manuals; these booklets ranged from 1,000 pages for simpler models to 3,000 pages for complex ones. While the cardboard Toy-Con are sturdy, Nintendo recognized that the cardboard can suffer wear and tear with time, and sells replacement sheets for individual Toy-Con through its online store. When asked about the durability of Labo during an interview with CNET, Yoshiyasu Ogasawara stated, "We tested their resilience to the same action through hundreds and thousands of repetitions, so we expect them to last a long time under normal use."

Starting in October 2018, Nintendo worked with the Institute of Play to bring Nintendo Labo into elementary schools, with an initial goal to reach 2,000 students by the end of the 2018–2019 school year. Nintendo is providing the Switch and Labo kits, while the institute is developing the lesson plans for teachers.

== Reception ==
On the day after its announcement in January 2018, Nintendo's stock price jumped around 2.4%, representing about US$1.4 billion to their value. Analysis suggested that Labo was the type of unorthodox product that only Nintendo could develop and market, showing a further return to their more financially successful period about a decade prior, leading to the rising stock price.

Nintendo Labo was received with praise for its unique take on video gaming and unconventional method of play, and its ability to encourage creativity and learning, especially in children. Reviewers primarily praised the enjoyable building experience and easy to follow step-by-step instructions; the rotatable camera and fast-forward/rewind features were appreciated, as well as the sense of humor that the instructions contain. Critics were initially concerned with the sturdiness of the cardboard, but were impressed with the durability of the assembled Toy-Con, also noting that the software contains tutorials with tips on repairing broken Toy-Con. Reviewers were mixed on the enjoyment and limited replay value of the software's gameplay, with Andrew Webster from The Verge saying "the games are perhaps the least interesting part of Labo." However, critics highlighted the seemingly unlimited options provided by Toy-Con Garage, and the possibility for the community to develop and share new creations. The Verge and CNET found Labo to be a clever utilization of the Joy-Con controllers' motion sensors, HD Rumble, and IR sensing abilities.

Labo was featured in a May 2018 episode of The Tonight Show Starring Jimmy Fallon, where Jimmy Fallon, Ariana Grande, and The Roots used various kits and Switches in a performance to premiere Grande's single, "No Tears Left to Cry". Some users have found ways to recreate the cardboard Toy-Con functionality with more sturdy versions using Lego bricks, otherwise retaining all the functionality of the original toys.

=== Sales ===
In Japan, the Variety Kit sold 90,410 copies within the first week, placing it first on the all-format sales chart. The Robot Kit sold 28,629 copies, placing it third, and the Vehicle Kit has sold 49,389 copies as of December 2018. As of March 2019, the Variety Kit has sold 330,000 units in Japan, and 1.09 million worldwide. As of 2018, all kits consolidated have sold 1.39 million units worldwide. The 2020 CESA Games White Papers revealed that the Variety Kit has sold 1.31 million units, as of December 2019.

=== Awards ===
Year	Awards	Category	Result	Ref.
2018	Golden Joystick Awards 2018	Nintendo Game of the Year	Nominated	
2018	The Game Awards 2018	Best Family Game	Nominated	
2019	New York Game Awards 2019	Central Park Children's Zoo Award for Best Kids Game	Won	
2019	NAVGTR Awards	Game, Special Class	Won	
2019	Game Developers Choice Awards	Innovation Award	Won	
2019	15th British Academy Games Awards	Family	Won	
2019	15th British Academy Games Awards	Game Beyond Entertainment	Nominated	
2019	15th British Academy Games Awards	Game Innovation	Won	
2019	Italian Video Game Awards	Best Family Game	Won	
2019	Italian Video Game Awards	Innovation Award	Nominated	
2019	Games for Change Awards	Most Innovative	Nominated	
2019	Games for Change Awards	Game of the Year	Won	
2019	CEDEC Awards	Game Design	Won	
2019	Japan Game Awards	Special Award	Won	
2019	Golden Joystick Awards 2019	Best VR/AR Game ("VR Kit")	Nominated	
2020	New York Game Awards 2020	Coney Island Dreamland Award for Best AR/VR Game ("VR Kit")	Nominated	

== See also ==
- Virtual Boy
- Game Builder Garage
