= Pokémon Smile =

2020 video game

- App icon featuring Pikachu, one of the Pokémon available in the game.
- Developers: The Pokémon Company, LITALICO
- Publisher: The Pokémon Company
- Series: Pokémon
- Platforms: iOS, Android
- Release: June 17, 2020

Pokémon Smile is a spin-off mobile game in the Pokémon franchise. The game uses a device's camera and augmented reality to teach children how to brush their teeth, with gameplay requiring the player to brush bacteria, which are holding Pokémon captive, off of their teeth in order to give the player a chance at capturing the Pokémon.

The game was developed in a joint collaboration between The Pokémon Company and LITALICO, with the latter having previously produced tooth-brushing games in the past. The two companies collaborated to help with educating children about brushing their teeth through the usage of the Pokémon franchise.

Pokémon Smile was released on June 17, 2020, by The Pokémon Company and is available as a free app for Android and iOS mobile devices. The game received primarily positive reviews from critics, who found the game to be entertaining, though some felt that the game lacked significant content, while others felt that the game was too difficult. Smile was later used in partnerships between various Japanese cities and The Pokémon Company following its release, being used in order to encourage better dental hygiene among children.

== Gameplay ==
A screenshot of Pokémon Smile's augmented reality gameplay featuring Bulbasaur.

The game uses the camera of the device it is being played on for an augmented reality system, which is used to play the game. Bacteria appear in the player's mouth and hold Pokémon captive. By brushing their teeth, the player is able to rescue the Pokémon. At the end, the game allows the player to attempt to catch one of the Pokémon. After catching Pokémon, they can be leveled up. The player can also earn other rewards, such as hats and stickers. Hats can be worn by the player in-game while they are brushing their teeth, while stickers are able to be placed on photographs taken of the player at the end of a tooth-brushing session. The time spent brushing can be set between one and three minutes. Each day, the game is able to notify users up to three times to remind them to brush their teeth.

The game will sometimes fail to recognize a player's brushing. According to The Pokémon Company, a colorful toothbrush in a bright room usually solves the problem. The game's difficulty is adjusted depending on the age inputted by the game's players when first playing the game, and the game allows for multiple save files with the goal of allowing multiple people to play with the same game. The game's soundtrack gets progressively more upgrades as the player captures more Pokémon.

== Development ==
Smile was developed by staff members from both The Pokémon Company and educational company LITALICO using Unity engine. LITALICO had previously developed the toothbrushing game Brushing Brave, which received positive responses. LITALICO reached out to The Pokémon Company in order for Brushing Brave's gameplay to get more attention by adding the Pokémon franchise to its gameplay. The game was developed with the intention of teaching children to brush their teeth through the Pokémon medium. As a result, the development team elected not to include in-app purchases and made the game free to play. The game was also hoped to be beneficial in allowing children to have early experiences with the Pokémon franchise. The game's sticker mechanics, proposed by the game's artist Kanahei, were additionally implemented due to being popular with children.

Development of the game began in July 2019, with development ramping up in September of the same year. Development of Smile proceeded quickly, in part due to LITALICO already having developed the game engine Smile used. The Pokémon are drawn in a unique art style by artist Kanahei, while the game's sound is done by former Capcom employee Reo Uratani, who also assisted with debugging the game. Uratani primarily implemented instruments familiar to younger children. Takashi Maeda, CEO of the company NASU Co., Ltd, aided in development of the game, helping develop the game's visual elements. Maeda stated he designed the game's menus with the intention of making sure they were accessible even to those unfamiliar with video game menus.

== Release and promotion ==
The game was announced during a Pokémon Presents presentation on June 17, 2020, and made available later that day. The game received its first major update in November 2021, adding several new hats and four new Pokémon. The second major update to the game was released in June 2022. It added over 100 Pokémon, including all remaining second generation Pokémon (from Pokémon Gold and Silver) that were not already in the game.

In the months following the game's release, the game received over half a million downloads. Following its release, Smile collaborated with the Xylitol Ramune candy brand, with Pokémon in the art style of the game appearing on its packaging. The company Lotte later produced dispensers for the Smile-themed Xylitol candy. An educational picture book, titled "Rub and Play! Pokémon Brush", which was themed around Smile, was later released. To coincide with Dental and Oral Health Week in Japan, an event was held in Tokoname, where Smile was suggested as a method of encouraging children to brush their teeth. In the city of Yao, Osaka, The Pokémon Company partnered with the city in order to have elementary school students learn to brush their teeth. Students could fill out a coloring book every time they brushed their teeth well, which could be exchanged at associated dental appointments for a Smile-themed toothbrush. A similar collaboration was held in Fukuoka.

== Reception ==
Luke Plunkett, writing for Kotaku, praised the game. Though he found the game to be lacking in features for adult fans of the series, he found the game's mechanics and gameplay to be effective for helping young children brush their teeth. Chris Scullion, writing for Nintendo Life, stated that while the game did not add much, it proved to be an effective way of making brushing teeth more exciting. He criticized the lack of an ability to scale the difficulty of the game for young children, as well as the game's difficulties with being able to see a player's face in a darkened environment.

Gavin Lane, writing for Nintendo Life, praised the game for its ability to market the Pokémon franchise in a way that appealed to both parents and children, as well as for its "wholesome" presentation and goals. Karen Han, writing for Polygon, enjoyed the game, but disliked the game's difficulty with tooth-brushing, which Han stated resulted in her quitting the game entirely. Alexis Nedd, writing for Mashable, found the game to be fun, and found that the game's difficulty and tooth-brushing goals encouraged her to keep playing the game.
