= Hello, Mario! =

2025 video game

- Developer: Nintendo
- Publisher: Nintendo
- Series: My Mario
- Platforms: Nintendo Switch iOS; Android
- Release: JP: August 26, 2025; WW: February 19, 2026
- Genre: Educational
- Mode: Single-player

Hello, Mario! (Note: Japanese: かおマリオ, Hepburn: Kaomario) is an educational video game developed and published by Nintendo for the Nintendo Switch and mobile devices as part of My Mario, a product line designed for infants and toddlers. It was first released in Japan on August 26, 2025, and later worldwide on February 19, 2026. In the game, players interact with Mario's face in a similar way to Super Mario 64's title screen.

A similar game where the players interact with Yoshi titled Hello, Yoshi! (Note: Japanese: かおヨッシー, Hepburn: Kaoyosshī) was released in Japan on November 18, 2025, and later worldwide on April 9, 2026. Two more similar games, called Hello, Luigi! (Note: Japanese: かおルイージー, Hepburn: Kaoruīji) and Hello, Peach! (Note: Japanese: かおピーチー, Hepburn: Kaopīchi), where players interact with Luigi and Princess Peach respectively, were released on October 5, 2026.

== Gameplay ==
Hello, Mario!, Hello, Yoshi!, Hello, Luigi!, and Hello, Peach! are educational video games that is designed for infants and toddlers to interact with the character's face in a similar manner to Super Mario 64's title screen. Users can manipulate their faces such as stretching, squishing, and spinning them. Users can also summon a number of power-ups and enemies to affect the screen and make things happen them.

In all four games, after several minutes of playtime, Mario, Yoshi, Luigi, or Peach will fall asleep and can no longer be interacted with. According to Nintendo, this feature was intended to help limit screen time for children and encourage them to take breaks. However, the app can be restarted to reawaken Mario or Yoshi, and the feature can be disabled by tapping the gear icon in the top-right corner of the screen when the application starts.

== Announcement and release ==
Hello, Mario! was first announced by Nintendo in a press release alongside the My Mario line of products on August 7, 2025, with a set release date in Japan for August 26, 2025. On January 9, 2026, Nintendo announced that Hello, Mario! will be brought overseas on February 19, 2026.

Nintendo later announced in a sister game titled Hello, Yoshi! in a press release on November 7, 2025, with a set release date in Japan for November 18, 2025. Nintendo later released Hello, Yoshi! overseas on April 9, 2026.

Two more sister games, titled Hello, Luigi! and Hello, Peach!, were announced by Nintendo on October 5, 2026, and released on the same day worldwide for Nintendo Switch, with mobile versions expected at a later date.

== Reception ==
While acknowledging that the app is intended to be used by children, Lance Ulanoff of TechRadar summarized Hello, Mario! as an "oddly engaging app that doesn't do much, but somehow perfectly conveys the ethos of Mario's antic personality".

== See also ==
- List of Mario educational games
