= Tomodachi Collection =

2009 video game by Nintendo

- Cover art
- Developer: Nintendo SPD
- Publisher: Nintendo
- Director: Ryutaro Takahashi
- Producer: Yoshio Sakamoto
- Designers: Mai Okamoto; Masanori Nakagawa
- Composers: Daisuke Shiiba; Asuka Itou
- Series: Tomodachi Life
- Platform: Nintendo DS
- Release: JP: June 18, 2009
- Genre: Social simulation
- Mode: Single-player

Tomodachi Collection (Note: Japanese: トモダチコレクション, Hepburn: Tomodachi Korekushon; lit. "Friend Collection". Also known in Japan as Tomokore (トモコレ)) is a 2009 social simulation video game developed and published by Nintendo for the Nintendo DS. It follows the daily interactions between interactive Miis, customizable avatars, who reside on an island overseen by the player, as they build relationships and solve problems. Tomodachi Collection is nonlinear, as the player's only goal is to maintain the happiness of their Miis.

A group of young Nintendo employees began developing the game in October 2005, replicating the Nintendo-published video game Tottoko Hamtaro: Tomodachi Daisakusen Dechu (2000). Titled Otona no Onna no Uranai Techō, the prototype featured character-creation avatars that were the progenitors for what would become the Miis. With suggestions from Nintendo president Satoru Iwata and game designer Shigeru Miyamoto, the team was reassigned to implement the Miis onto the Wii console, during which the game's production was put on hold. Following the Wii's release in the Japanese market on December 2, 2006, the project restarted as Tomodachi Collection around April 2007. Developers sought to create entertaining gameplay that emphasized the human-like characteristics of the Miis, whom players were incentivized to create in the image of their real-world friends and family.

Tomodachi Collection was released exclusively in Japan on June 18, 2009. It received contemporary and retrospective praise for its tone and presentation. Tomodachi Collection was a domestic commercial success; it sold 3.76 million copies by September 30, 2026, making it one of the best-selling DS games and the second-best-selling Japan-exclusive on the console, behind English Training (2006).

Plans to localize Tomodachi Collection overseas never came to fruition, largely because the Miis' voice synthesizer was unable to replicate English. A direct sequel, Tomodachi Life, was released in Japan, under the name Tomodachi Collection: New Life, on April 18, 2013 for the Nintendo 3DS, spawning the Tomodachi Life series. After years of internal development on more advanced text-to-speech programs, the sequel was released globally throughout June 2014.

== Gameplay ==
Screenshot of a Mii requesting assistance with a particular problem inside their apartment

Tomodachi Collection is a social simulation game featuring Miis who populate an apartment complex on an island. Miis are user-customizable avatars whose features are manually adjusted to create caricatures of real-world people or fictional characters. Such features include face shapes, head hair, facial hair, eyes, noses, mouths, and glasses. To add Miis, the player can transfer existing Miis directly from their Wii to their Nintendo DS, import Miis from other players' DS consoles via wireless local connectivity, or create new ones from scratch using the in-game Mii Maker. In any case, the player manually modifies their Miis' appearance and personality. There are four temperament categories Miis can occupy, which, together with their assigned date of birth, determine an "ideal job" that matches them. The Miis audibly speak through computer-generated voice synthesis. A maximum of 100 Miis can live on the island at once.

After creation, Miis request assistance with particular problems, signified by the presence of a thought bubble. These issues include asking for food, clothing, guidance on prospective relationships, and player participation in short minigames. Satisfying their needs advances their level, a numeric progression system, upon which the player can gift them new clothes, interior designs for their apartment, personalized catchphrases, or songs for them to perform. Completing minigames awards the player with valuables that can be exchanged for in-game currency. The player can eavesdrop on the Miis' dreams while they sleep.

Tomodachi Collection is nonlinear; the player's only goal is to maintain their Miis' satisfaction and passively observe their actions. Outside of the player's direct influence, the Miis regularly interact with one another, forming friendships and occasionally experiencing conflict. If two friendly Miis are romantically attracted to one another, one can confess their love to the other; if the confession is successful, the two are paired as a couple. Marriage can occur following additional interactions. As the player continuously appeases the Miis, new venues and shops on the island become unlocked. These include a Career Hall where jobs are formally assigned to Miis, a Compatibility Tester that gauges two Miis' likelihood of friendship, and a vendor for purchasing apartment interiors. An in-universe news broadcast occurs regularly to inform the player of recent events on the island. Time-sensitive events held by the Miis also take place in the island's fountain. Time on the island passes parallel to that set on the player's console, even when the console is powered off.

== Development ==
=== Conception and early character creator (2005–2006) ===
Otona no Onna no Uranai Techō's character-creation system

Tomodachi Collection was first conceptualized around October 2005 by a small team of junior employees at Nintendo SPD. Its premise was inspired by the fortune-telling video game Tottoko Hamtaro: Tomodachi Daisakusen Dechu (2000), published by Nintendo for the Game Boy Color in Japan. Tottoko Hamtaro, whose core audience was young girls, had users register a list of virtual profiles of close friends to measure compatibility and generate predictions about their day-to-day lives. Producer Yoshio Sakamoto agreed with some female employees' idea for a derivative version of Tottoko Hamtaro geared to older women, the thought of which "stayed with [him]". He would then find himself "in a team made up of all new people ... relatively free to do what we wanted". With the dual goal of elevating the Nintendo DS' overall appeal to women, the project became tentatively known as Otona no Onna no Uranai Techō (大人のオンナの占い手帳, lit. 'Women's Fortune Telling Pocket Notebook'). Initially including only textual information about personal names and birthdays, the team resolved to add a three-dimensional character creation mechanism. This system—inspired by the Japanese game fukuwarai, which involves assembling a face using disembodied parts—had players manually combine selected face elements to create caricatures of real-world people. The ability to rotate, resize, and reposition facial features was added, enhancing the character creator's accuracy.

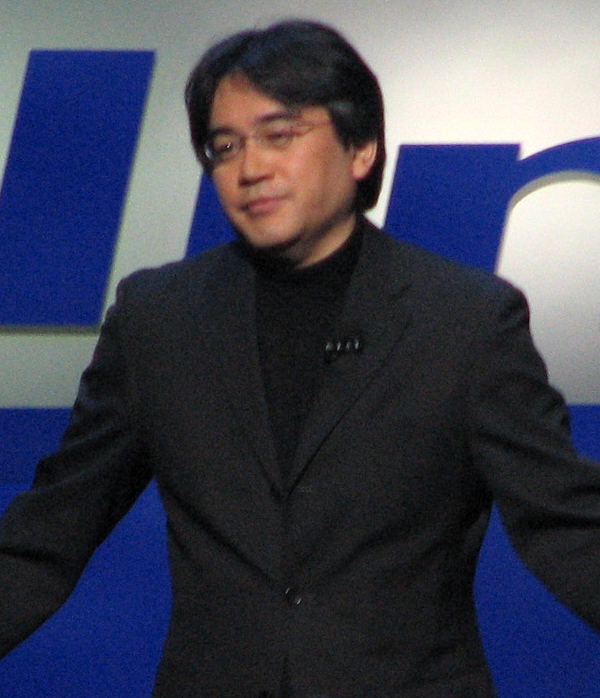
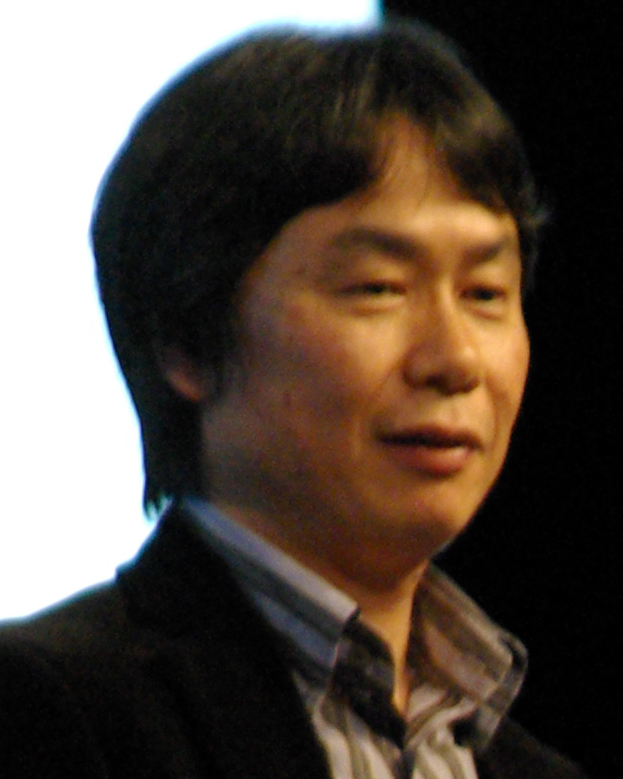
The character-creation prototype was demonstrated to Nintendo president Satoru Iwata (left, in 2006) and game designer Shigeru Miyamoto (right, in 2007)

Sakamoto demonstrated the prototype to Nintendo president Satoru Iwata early in 2006. Iwata further relayed it to game designer Shigeru Miyamoto, who was working on the then-upcoming Wii console with a separate development team. Miyamoto had petitioned for the inclusion of character-creation mechanics in Nintendo consoles for more than a decade, starting with the Famicom through the GameCube, but encountered design limitations and internal company pushback. At the time of the Wii, he was experimenting with including kokeshi doll-like avatars in Wii Sports (2006). Upon viewing the DS prototype, Miyamoto told his coworkers, "You guys are useless," briefly switching teams to help develop the character-creator. During a trans-departmental meeting concerning the Wii's hardware, Miyamoto formally proposed the prototype be reworked as pack-in software for the Wii. Many of his peers expressed concern over the avatars, believing they were too rudimentary and often not particularly accurate. Additionally, much of the Wii's hardware had already been finalized, contributing to developer reluctance. Once hearing Miyamoto's reasoning that most users, young or old, would find joy in the creative process regardless of its limitations, most of the Wii staff agreed to implement the caricatures, which would become the Miis.

Development on Otona no Onna no Uranai Techō stalled around August 2006 following its team's internal reassignment to lead producers of the Wii's Mii Channel, at the suggestion of Iwata. Leading up to the debut of the Wii in December 2006, director Ryutaro Takahashi re-envisioned Otona no Onna no Uranai Techō as a simulation title appealing to all ages and genders, since the DS had by then already gained popularity among women.

=== Development as Tomodachi Collection (2007–2009) ===
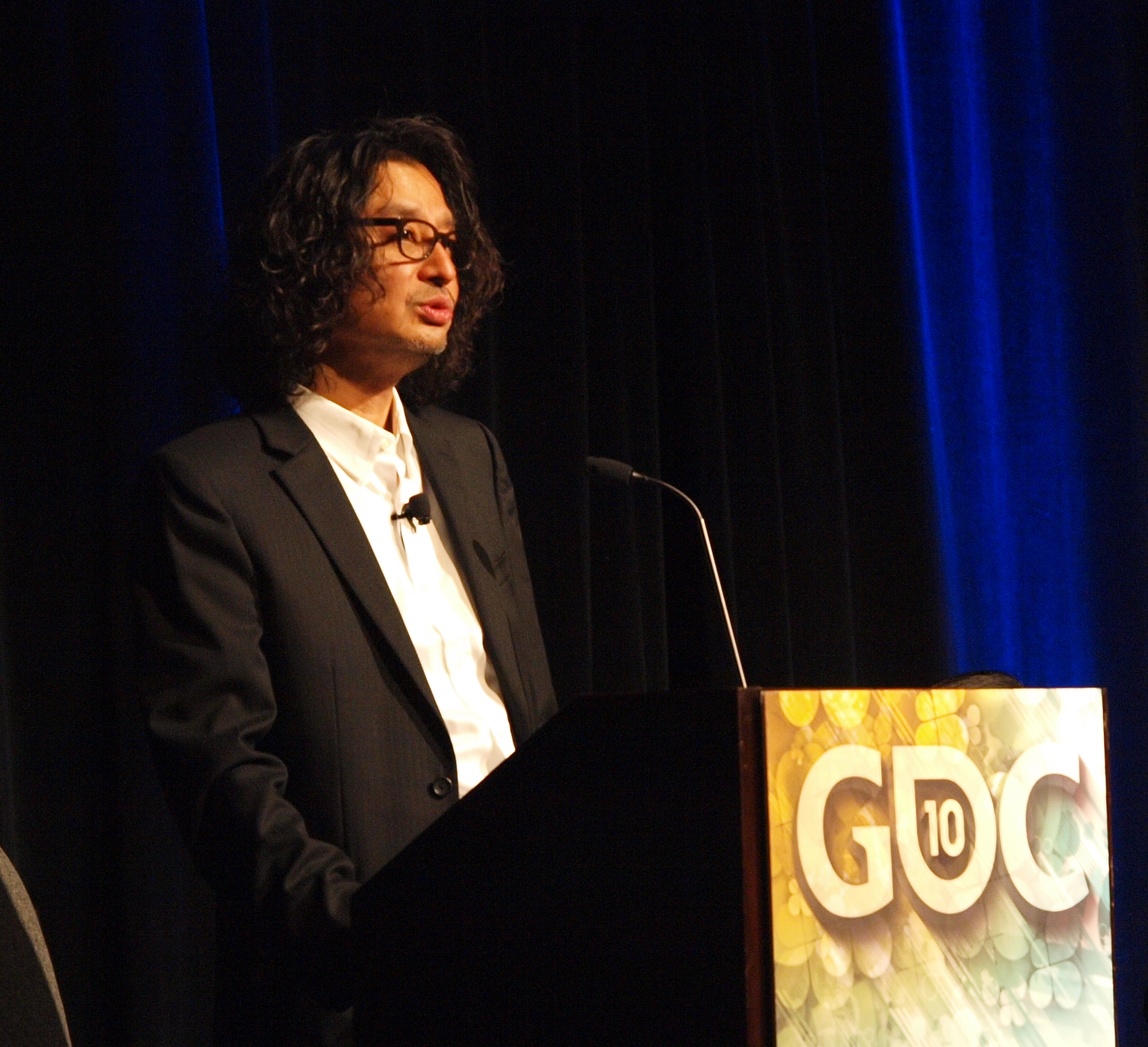
Sakamoto speaking at the 2010 Game Developers Conference, during which he discussed Tomodachi Collection's development

The project formally restarted in April 2007 under the title Tomodachi Collection, "tomodachi" being the Japanese word for "friend". Takahashi visualized the game's new directorial framework as "the ultimate family software that just makes you want to get up and show it to people". Sakamoto saw Tomodachi Collection as a laid-back, entertaining way for players to strengthen their real-world connections with friends and family, whom the Miis are generally intended to represent. During a keynote speech at the 2010 Game Developers Conference (GDC), Sakamoto stated, "[Tomodachi Collection] is a game where in addition to the player having fun playing, the player's friends can't help but be drawn in as well."

Takahashi, Sakamoto, and Iwata remembered Tomodachi Collection's production as periodically troublesome, citing the team's relative inexperience in the company. This was exacerbated by the fact that Sakamoto was simultaneously working on Metroid: Other M (2010) and thus could rarely provide input. While the team was intending for production to conclude within six to nine months, Tomodachi Collection's development became protracted. Miis would end up debuting worldwide on the DS in an unrelated game titled Personal Trainer: Walking (2008); Sakamoto spoke of this as helping create a sense of urgency to complete the project. In retrospect, Sakamoto expressed gratitude that production took as long as it did, as it allowed the team to patiently experiment with unique ideas that would have been otherwise rejected.

One of the team's goals was to give the Miis unique personalities, diverging from their status as symbolic avatars in previous games. Sakamoto cited the game's lead programmer, Masanori Nakagawa, as significantly influencing its tone. One of Nakagawa's contributions was proposing that Miis be able to sing, which led to them also being given conversational speech capabilities. Daisuke Shiiba joined the team as Tomodachi Collection's lead sound designer in March 2008. Asuka Itou served as Tomodachi Collection's composer during its last six months of development. Both Shiiba and Itou characterized the soundtrack as deliberately "cheap" and simplistic; Sakamoto was particular in having the game's music not stand out. For instance, when creating the theme that plays when the player idly monitors the island, Shiiba developed "a melody that sounded like someone who wasn't very good at playing the recorder". Shiiba and Itou spoke of the composition process as nevertheless challenging due to Tomodachi Collection's eccentric atmosphere, finding outside inspiration difficult to come by. Shiiba recalled struggling to establish a balance between making the game's songs unconventional yet pleasing to listen to.

== Release ==
Tomodachi Collection was released for the Nintendo DS in Japan on June 18, 2009, with a demo version distributed through the Wii's Nintendo Channel, Nintendo Zone, and local DS Stations. To promote it, a television program titled Koi no Kaitou!? Tomodachi Collection II (恋のカイトウ!?トモコレ2世, lit. 'Love's Answer!? Tomodachi Collection Second Generation') featuring Japanese actresses Mari Sekine, Maaya Morinaga, and Rima Nishizaki alongside their Mii caricatures began airing on Tokyo Metropolitan Television on May 6, 2010. A television commercial featuring celebrities Keiko Kitagawa and Shihori Kanjiya also aired around the same time, with the game's official website updated to include tutorials for players on how to create Miis of the two.

Nintendo considered localizing the game overseas, with the company reportedly having trademarked the name Friend Collection in Europe in 2009. This plan was scrapped when Nintendo discovered that the voice synthesis program used for the Miis' speech, built natively for Japanese, could not replicate the phonetic complexities of English. Additional concerns were raised regarding a potential lack of cultural appeal outside of Japan. Sakamoto stated in an interview with 1Up.com, "Obviously I can't speak to future plans, but [localization] seems like something we might be able to revisit once more powerful hardware comes along."

== Reception ==
Reviewers felt the game had significant comedy value. Four critics for Famitsu commended the humor as charming and most effective when the Miis were made in the likenesses of real-world people, even though one reviewer felt that the absence of a clear objective could cause Tomodachi Collection to become monotonous. Gregoire Hellot of Gamekult agreed that including both real-world people and fictional characters was enjoyable, but thought the game would lack long-term appeal for players who did not already have many friends or acquaintances to base their Miis on. The Miis' synthetic voices were reviewed favorably by Siliconera staff as unique for a Nintendo title. Tomodachi Collection was awarded the prize in Innovation at the 2009 Famitsu Awards. It also received the Award for Excellence alongside 10 other titles at the Japan Game Awards' 2010 ceremony.

Some retrospective commentators similarly opined that Tomodachi Collection's comedic presentation was endearing. In 2014, Tomodachi Collection's sense of humor was deemed eccentric by Nintendo Life's Kerry Brunskill, who called it "a bizarre but strangely endearing Mii theme park". She expressed dismay that the game was never localized beyond Japan. Famitsu's Kawachi in 2015 described the game's situational comedy as entertaining and occasionally touching. A 2019 retrospective by IGN Japan's Esra Kurabe wrote that Tomodachi Collection was well-suited for casual gamers, calling its core premise simple yet humorous.

=== Sales ===
Tomodachi Collection was a commercial success in Japan, selling 38,000 units in its first day and about 102,000 units by the end of its debut week. By September 28, 2009, it had sold a total of 1.15 million copies, making it the fourth-best-selling game in Japan in the first half of the 2009 fiscal year. On March 31, 2010, Nintendo reported that it had sold 3.2 million units, while the game amassed 3.72 million copies sold by September 30, 2026. Tomodachi Collection became one of the best-selling titles for the DS, and the second-best-selling Japan-exclusive on the console, behind only English Training (2006). One writer for Inside Games attributed Tomodachi Collection's domestic popularity to word-of-mouth marketing between Japanese players.

== Sequels and other media ==
A sequel for the Nintendo 3DS titled Tomodachi Collection: New Life was released in Japan on April 18, 2013. Unlike its predecessor, Nintendo fully localized the game for foreign regions. This became possible following years of internal development on more advanced text-to-speech programs that could accommodate non-Japanese languages. New Life was released as Tomodachi Life in North America and Europe on June 6, 2014. Much of Tomodachi Collection's staff, including director Takahashi, producer Sakamoto, and art designer Mai Okamoto, returned to develop the sequel. The Japanese version featured an exclusive mechanic that allowed players to import existing Miis from Tomodachi Collection using a dedicated Nintendo eShop application.

On October 31, 2024, Tomodachi Collection's soundtrack was made available through the Nintendo Music streaming service exclusively for Nintendo Switch Online subscribers. Another sequel, Tomodachi Life: Living the Dream, titled Tomodachi Collection: Exciting Life in Japan, was released on April 16, 2026, for the Nintendo Switch. Takahashi and Sakamoto reprised their roles as the key developers.
