= Tomodachi Life =

Video game series by Nintendo

- English logo since 2026
- Genre: Social simulation game
- Developers: Nintendo SPD (2009–2014); Nintendo EPD (2026)
- Publisher: Nintendo
- Creators: Yoshio Sakamoto; Ryutaro Takahashi
- Platforms: Nintendo DS; Nintendo 3DS; Nintendo Switch
- First release: Tomodachi Collection; June 18, 2009
- Latest release: Tomodachi Life: Living the Dream; April 16, 2026

Tomodachi Life, known in Japan as Tomodachi Collection, (Note: トモダチコレクション, Tomodachi Korekushon; lit. "Friend Collection". Also known informally as Tomokore (トモコレ)) is a series of social simulation video games developed and published by Nintendo. The games feature customizable casts of Mii avatars who populate an island. They autonomously form relationships and ask the player, who serves as an external observer, to help with problems.

The series began with the Nintendo DS title Tomodachi Collection (2009). Originally conceptualized in 2005 by junior developers as a fortune-telling game, its development stalled in 2006 when its prototype character-creation system was adopted for use on the Wii console to create the Miis. Production restarted in 2007 under a new focus on social simulation; the game released solely in Japan.

The series made its international debut with the release of Tomodachi Life (2013) on the Nintendo 3DS. Nintendo spent a year localizing the game for foreign markets by adapting regional dialogue, cultural imagery, and in-game currency. Ahead of Tomodachi Life's worldwide release, an online controversy emerged regarding the inability for Miis to enter same-sex relationships. Nintendo ultimately apologized, and pledged to add more inclusive gameplay if they chose to make a sequel.

Following the release of Tomodachi Life, other Mii-centric titles were produced by Nintendo that were regularly compared to it by video game publications. These included the social network Miitomo on smartphones and the role-playing game Miitopia (both 2016) on the 3DS; the latter received a remaster on the Nintendo Switch in 2021. Following a decade-long series hiatus, a third entry, Tomodachi Life: Living the Dream (2026) released for the Switch. Among other customization additions, players are able to modify their Miis' romantic preferences, permitting same-sex pairings.

The Tomodachi Life series has collectively sold 18.73 million copies worldwide as of September 30, 2026; Living the Dream is its best-selling entry, having sold over 8.81 million units. The series has received praise from critics for its comedy and presentation, while opinions towards its core gameplay have been more mixed. Tomodachi Life amassed a cult following in the years following its release.

== Common gameplay elements ==
The personality selection menu in the Mii Maker, as seen in Tomodachi Life: Living the Dream

Tomodachi Life is a social simulation series that has the player monitor the lives of Miis residing on an island, helping them solve problems and watching relationships form. Miis are user-customizable avatars whose features are manually adjusted to create caricatures of real-world people or fictional characters. Such features include face shapes, head hair, facial hair, eyes, noses, mouths, and glasses. The player can create Miis from scratch using a built-in Mii Maker. The series' Mii Maker includes exclusive options for manipulating the Miis' personalities and the sounds of their text-to-speech voices. The player can also import existing Miis from elsewhere through a variety of outlets that differ between installments. (Note: In Tomodachi Collection, players transfer Miis from a Wii to a DS, or between nearby DS consoles via local wireless connectivity. In Tomodachi Life, the player is given the option to import Miis from the 3DS' Mii Maker or scan a specialized QR code attached to a pre-constructed Mii. In Living the Dream, Miis can be imported from the console's Mii Maker and can be shared between users locally; online sharing is not supported.)

Once created, the Miis begin to autonomously interact with their peers, resulting in friendships and sporadic conflict. Miis can also harbor romantic feelings for one another, which can progress into formal dating and eventual marriage. In Tomodachi Life and Living the Dream, married Miis can have children. The games' interactivity occurs when the Miis notify the player of certain problems they have. These issues range from requests for food or clothing, relationship guidance, and invitations to compete in short minigames. Fulfilling a request grants experience points toward a Mii's happiness level; leveling up prompts the player to award the Mii a gift.

The Tomodachi Life games are nonlinear, the player's only objective being to add Miis and continuously maintain their happiness. As Miis are gradually added to the island, numerous venues throughout the island are unlocked. These include food and clothing vendors, as well as recreational spots that Miis can visit in their own time.

== Games ==
Release timeline Main entries in bold
2009	**Tomodachi Collection**
2010
2011
2012
2013	**Tomodachi Life**
2014
2015
2016	Miitomo
2016	Miitopia (3DS)
2017
2018
2019
2020
2021	Miitopia (Switch)
2022
2023
2024
2025
2026	**Tomodachi Life: Living the Dream**

=== Main installments ===
==== Tomodachi Collection (2009) ====
Tomodachi Collection (Note: トモダチコレクション, Tomodachi Korekushon) is a social simulation game released for the Nintendo DS on June 18, 2009, solely in Japan. It features a customizable cast of Mii characters, all of whom reside in an apartment complex, that form relationships and ask for the player's assistance on specific issues.

==== Tomodachi Life (2013) ====
Tomodachi Life, known in Japan as Tomodachi Collection: New Life, (Note: トモダチコレクション 新生活, Tomodachi Korekushon: Shin Seikatsu) is a social simulation game released for the Nintendo 3DS on April 18, 2013 in Japan and worldwide throughout 2014.

Like its predecessor, Tomodachi Life situates the Miis in an apartment on an island as they randomly request help with problems. The Japanese version of the game features an exclusive mechanic whereby players can import existing Miis from Tomodachi Collection using a dedicated Nintendo eShop application. One feature introduced in Tomodachi Life is the ability for married Miis to have children. When grown, children can be moved to an apartment unit or sent off to other players' islands by way of the 3DS' StreetPass mechanic, which allows nearby 3DS owners to wirelessly exchange data.

==== Tomodachi Life: Living the Dream (2026) ====
Tomodachi Life: Living the Dream, known in Japan as Tomodachi Collection: Exciting Life, (Note: トモダチコレクション わくわく生活, Tomodachi Korekushon: Waku Waku Seikatsu) is a social simulation game released for the Nintendo Switch on April 16, 2026, over a decade following the release of Tomodachi Life.

Unlike previous entries, Miis are able to autonomously wander about the island. The island itself can also be expanded and decorated using furnishings unlocked by spending "wishes". These are accumulated by spending "warm fuzzies" obtained by solving Miis' problems. Living the Dream is the first entry in the series to permit same-sex relationships, as the player is able to manually select a Mii's dating preferences. The game includes further customization options for hair, ears, facial features, "face paint", and the island itself. Living the Dream also introduces avenues for user-generated content (UGC), players being able to create their own items and clothing.

=== Related games ===
==== Miitomo (2016) ====
Miitomo (Note: ミートモ, Mītomo) was a social networking mobile application released for iOS and Android on March 17, 2016 in Japan and March 31 in North America and Europe. The app had players create personalized Miis, customizable with personalities, voices, and clothing in a similar manner to Tomodachi Life, and respond to a variety of pre-made questions. Their answers could then be shared between friends.

==== Miitopia (2016, 2021) ====
Miitopia (Note: ミートピア, Mītopia) is a role-playing game released for the 3DS on December 8, 2016 in Japan and July 28, 2017 in North America and Europe. A remaster for the Switch was released on May 21, 2021. The game, set in the eponymous land of Miitopia, features a party of Miis who must defeat monsters led by the villainous Dark Lord, responsible for stealing the faces of Miitopia's citizens. In the 3DS version, players can import their Miis from Tomodachi Life.

Miitopia uses a turn-based combat system where only the player's central Mii is directly controlled; all other party members fight autonomously. Miis form interpersonal relationships that affect gameplay. If the player places two Miis in the same room at an inn, or dispatches them on an outing, their numeric relationship level increases, which generates perks usable in fights. Miis can alternatively bicker and fight amongst each other, which disrupts the flow of battles.

== Development and history ==
=== 2005–2006: Early conception and birth of the Miis ===
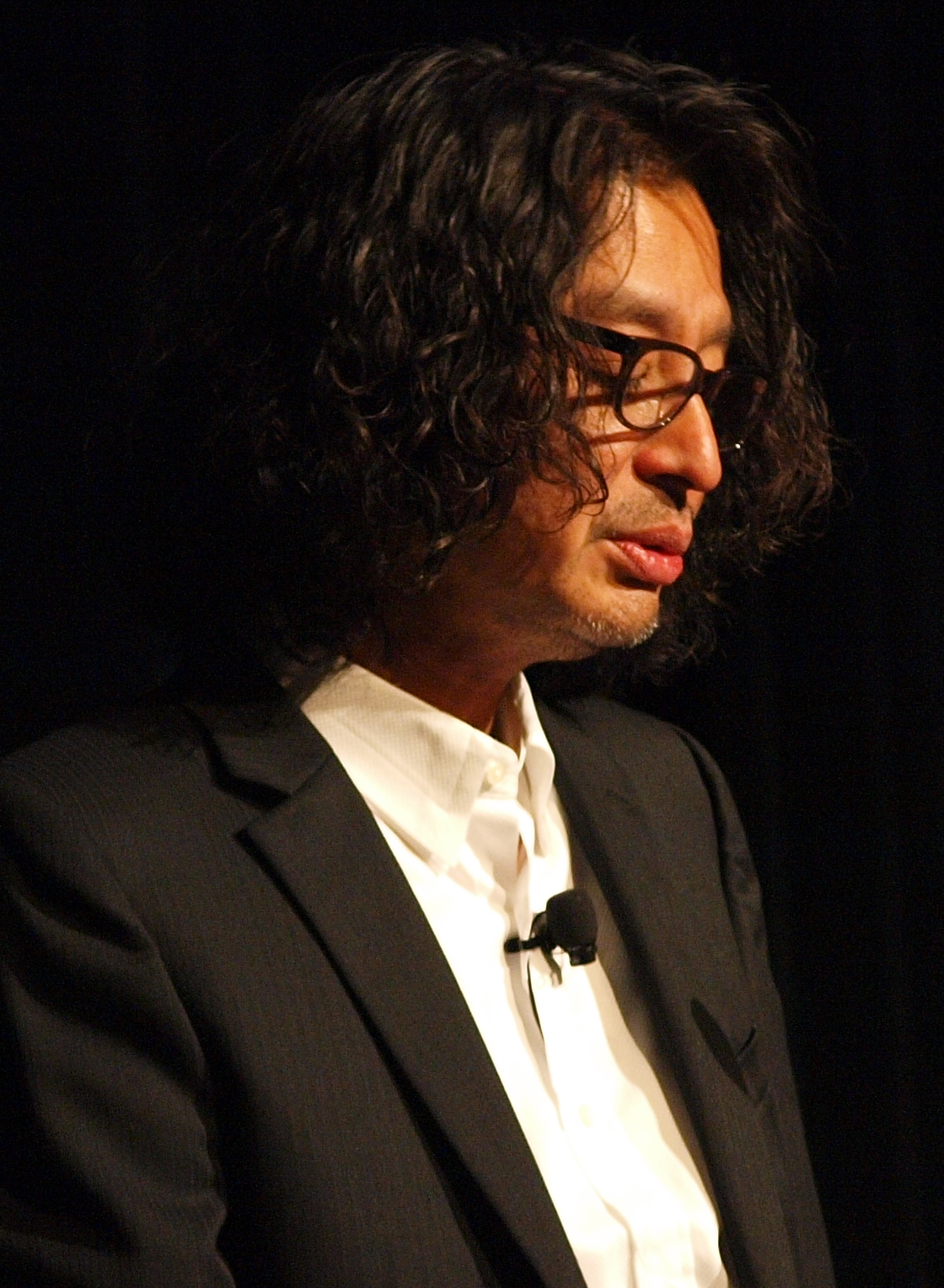
Series producer Yoshio Sakamoto in 2010

The first entry in the series, Tomodachi Collection, was conceived in October 2005 by a small team of junior Nintendo employees at Nintendo SPD. Producer Yoshio Sakamoto recounted that several female staff requested that a derivative version of the fortune-telling Game Boy Color game Tottoko Hamtaro: Tomodachi Daisakusen Dechu (2000), whose core audience was young girls, be made that would instead be geared to adult women. This idea materialized into a Nintendo DS title tentatively known as Otona no Onna no Uranai Techō (大人のオンナの占い手帳, lit. 'Women's Fortune Telling Pocket Notebook'). Initially limited to textual information like names and birthdays, the prototype soon integrated a three-dimensional character-creation system. This system had players manipulate the positions and sizes of selected facial elements to create caricatures of real-world people. Proud of the prototype, Sakamoto demonstrated it to Nintendo president Satoru Iwata early in 2006.

At the same time, game designer Shigeru Miyamoto was working on the then-upcoming Wii system with a separate team. He had previously petitioned for the inclusion of character-creation mechanics in games for a decade but encountered design limitations and pushback from his peers. Iwata relayed the prototype to Miyamoto, upon which the latter, seeing promise in the concept, requested it be reworked as pack-in-software for the Wii. Despite initial reluctance from the Wii team, developers eventually agreed to rework the creator's avatars into the Miis. Development on Otona no Onna no Uranai Techō stalled following its team's reassignment to implement the Miis onto the Wii until the console's release in December 2006.

=== 2007–2013: Change in vision towards social simulation ===
Logo for Tomodachi Collection

While the Miis were being added to the Wii, Otona no Onna no Uranai Techō's director Ryutaro Takahashi reinvisioned the game as a social simulation title appealing to all ages and genders, as the DS had by then already attained popularity with women. Production formally restarted in April 2007 under the name Tomodachi Collection, "tomodachi" being the Japanese word for "friend". The team's relative inexperience and Sakamoto's simultaneous development of Metroid: Other M (2010) extended production beyond initial projections. Following the game's release in Japan, localization for Western regions was considered but ultimately rejected because the voice synthesis program used for the Miis was unable to replicate the phonetic complexities of English. Sakamoto remained interested in the concept and stated that localization could be revisited whenever more powerful hardware came along.

Much of Collection's staff would return to develop a direct sequel for the Nintendo 3DS, dubbed Tomodachi Collection: New Life. Director Eisaku Nakae commented that New Life's production was approached in a more focused manner than its predecessor. Art designer Mai Okamoto sought a "next-generation" visual aesthetic for New Life, though Sakamoto insisted on retaining the original's robotic Mii voices, viewing them as integral to the series' identity. The development team wanted to inject an atmopshere of familial love to the game. They hoped the title would inspire players to view their real-world connections with friends and family in a more positive light through the Miis.

=== 2014–2016: Localization, same-sex relationship controversy, and other Mii-centric titles ===
Unlike with Collection, Nintendo took efforts to localize New Life to global markets, the entire process taking over a year. This localized version of New Life would release worldwide under the name Tomodachi Life. A primary focus of localization was elevating the game's appeal to other regions without sacrificing its core gameplay. Some alterations included replacing Miis' body gestures with those found in other countries, translating local currencies, and proofreading translated dialogue to ensure it felt natural to foreign speakers. The word "tomodachi" was retained in the game's overseas name to elicit intrigue and make it distinct.

Ahead of the game's international release in 2014, controversy arose online regarding the inability for two Miis of the same gender to enter romantic relationships. A rumor that a bug making same-sex relationships feasible was patched in the Japanese release was refuted by Nintendo. They wrote that the confusion likely stemmed from the patch being released while Japanese players shared images of attempts to circumvent the lack of same-sex relationships by giving female Miis a masculine appearance. The company stated it would not add same-sex relationships after the fact, as they "never intended to make any form of social commentary with the launch of Tomodachi Life". The comment elicited backlash from LGBTQ players, following which Nintendo apologized. They pledged that were they to release a third installment in the series, they would strive to make its gameplay more inclusive.

Following the release of Tomodachi Life, two other Mii-centric titles with similar simulation elements released globally. The first was Miitomo, a smartphone application released on iOS and Android devices. It was produced by key members of Tomodachi Life's development team, under the supervision of Sakamoto. The second was Miitopia, a turn-based role-playing game that was released for the 3DS. Certain graphic designers hailing from Tomodachi Life's production team provided assistance.

=== 2017–present: Development on a sequel to Tomodachi Life ===
Development on a direct sequel to Tomodachi Life, titled Tomodachi Life: Living the Dream, for the Nintendo Switch began in 2017, shortly after work concluded on Miitomo. As with its predecessors, Living the Dream was produced under the supervision of Takahashi and Sakamoto. The two were inspired to create a sequel due to the 3DS' technical limitations that they believed held back the previous game's scale. They worked under a focus on UGC tools to compensate for what Takahashi thought were previous entries' lack of long-term replayability. Living the Dream's art direction was described as "a simple, anime-inspired toon-style", which developers felt matched the series' quirky tone. The game's additional customization options for physical appearances, dating preferences, and gender were implemented to better allow players to create any individual they desired.

Miitomo's servers were taken offline on May 9, 2018. Nintendo cited the app's dwindling userbase and a desire to allocate resources onto other smartphone endeavors as reason for the shutdown. An enhanced port of Miitopia for the Switch was released in 2021. Living the Dream was announced on March 27, 2025, and was fully released on April 16, 2026.

== Reception and legacy ==
=== Reviews ===
Sales and aggregate review scores As of August 2026.
Game	Year	Units sold (in millions)	Metacritic
Tomodachi Collection	2009	3.2	—
Tomodachi Life	2013	6.72	71/100 (Note: Based on 52 reviews)
Tomodachi Life: Living the Dream	2026	8.83	78/100 (Note: Based on 97 reviews)

The Tomodachi Life series' gameplay and presentation have drawn comparisons to fellow simulation series The Sims, (Note: Attributed to multiple sources:) as well as to other Nintendo franchises such as Animal Crossing and WarioWare. Critics reviewing Miitomo and Miitopia compared their simulation elements and Mii-centric premises to that of Tomodachi Life on 3DS. (Note: Miitomo; Miitopia)

Tomodachi Collection's humor was praised by critics as unique, though some felt its lack of a clear objective could induce boredom for certain players. They wrote that the game's entertainment was most effective when Miis were made in the likenesses of real-world people. Retrospective commentators variously described Tomodachi Collection as emotionally touching, entertaining, and bizarre. The game won two accolades at the 2009 Famitsu Awards and 2010 Japan Game Awards.

Tomodachi Life received mixed reviews upon release. Critics hailed the game's quirky humor and tone; some felt that its status as an informal crossover, with players incentivized to make Miis of virtually anyone, compounded its situational comedy. Opinions of its gameplay were more critical. Some felt its goal of making Miis happy quickly became tiring, and that the player's inability to control which Miis could enter romantic relationships jeopardized its focus on imitating real-world interactions. Its barring of same-gender romance was lamented as needlessly restrictive. (Note: Attributed to multiple sources:) Tomodachi Life amassed a cult following among players in the years following its release, attributed to viral social media posts depicting outlandish scenarios between Miis. (Note: Attributed to multiple sources:) The game was nominated for Best Family Game at The Game Awards 2014 and the Use of Sound, New IP category by the National Academy of Video Game Trade Reviewers (NAVGTR) at its 2014 awards ceremony.

Tomodachi Life: Living the Dream received positive reviews. Leading up to its release, fans responded positively to its addition of same-sex romance. Upon launch, the game's face paint feature, expanded relationship mechanics, and use of custom text fields were met with praise for their versatility. Many critics enjoyed Living the Dream's surreal humor and likened it to reality television. Reception towards its gameplay was more lukewarm. Critics felt its core gameplay could become repetitive, especially for players unwilling to engage with the UGC tools, arguing that they were necessary to maintain long-term interest. The game's lack of online functionality, with screenshot and Mii sharing expressely prohibited, received criticism.

=== Sales ===
Tomodachi Collection sold about 102,000 units in Japan by the end of its debut week and 3.2 million copies by March 31, 2010, making it one of the best-selling DS titles. Tomodachi Life, like its predecessor, was a best-seller in Japan; it also sold well in other regions, amassing 6.72 lifetime sales and becoming one of the highest-selling games for the 3DS. Living the Dream has sold 8.83 million copies worldwide as of September 30, 2026, making it the best-selling installment in the series to date.

=== In other media ===
Iconography from the Tomodachi Life series has appeared in other Nintendo games. A battle stage themed on the first two games' apartment building was introduced exclusively in Super Smash Bros. for 3DS (2014). If selected, the game would automatically grab Miis from the player's 3DS to appear as background characters in the stage. The stage returned as an offering in Super Smash Bros. Ultimate (2018). A "microgame" based on Tomodachi Life appeared in WarioWare Gold (2018).

To commemorate the release of Tomodachi Life, a physical booklet depicting various Miis in the style of a fashion catalog was offered to Club Nintendo members. Several pieces of merchandise for Living the Dream were made available as pre-order bonuses in certain regions. Customers in the UK were offered a themed magnetic photo frame. Japanese customers were given a variety of items depending on the retailer, including stickers and keychains depicting Miis. All three entries have had portions of their soundtrack made available on Nintendo Music. Tomodachi Collection's was released on October 13, 2024; Tomodachi Life's was added on February 3, 2026; and a select number of Living the Dream's songs were included as part of a "special release" on April 16, 2026.

== See also ==
- List of video games featuring Miis
