= Super Metroid =

1994 video game

- North American box art featuring Samus Aran battling Ridley
- Developers: Nintendo R&D1; Intelligent Systems
- Publisher: Nintendo
- Director: Yoshio Sakamoto
- Producer: Makoto Kano
- Programmer: Kenji Imai
- Artists: Hirofumi Matsuoka; Masahiko Mashimo; Hiroyuki Kimura
- Composers: Kenji Yamamoto; Minako Hamano
- Series: Metroid
- Platform: Super Nintendo Entertainment System
- Release: JP: March 19, 1994; NA: April 18, 1994; PAL: July 28, 1994
- Genre: Action-adventure
- Mode: Single-player

Super Metroid (Note: Japanese: スーパーメトロイド, Hepburn: Sūpā Metoroido) (Note: The opening cutscene alternatively refers to the game as Metroid 3.) is a 1994 action-adventure game developed by Nintendo and Intelligent Systems and published by Nintendo for the Super Nintendo Entertainment System (SNES). It is the third Metroid game, following the Game Boy game Metroid II: Return of Samus (1991). The player controls bounty hunter Samus Aran, who travels to the planet Zebes to retrieve an infant Metroid creature stolen by the Space Pirate leader Ridley.

Like the previous two Metroid games, Super Metroid focuses on exploring a sprawling alien world to find power-ups used to reach previously inaccessible areas. New elements include an inventory screen, an automap, and the ability to fire in 8 directions. The development staff from previous Metroid games—including Yoshio Sakamoto, Makoto Kano and Gunpei Yokoi—returned to develop Super Metroid over the course of two years.

Super Metroid received acclaim, with praise for its atmosphere, gameplay, music and graphics. It is often cited as one of the greatest video games of all time. The game sold well and shipped 1.42 million copies worldwide by late 2003. Alongside Castlevania: Symphony of the Night, Super Metroid is credited for establishing the Metroidvania genre, inspiring numerous indie games and developers. Super Metroid was followed in 2002 by Metroid Fusion and Metroid Prime. It has been re-released on several Nintendo consoles and services.

== Gameplay ==
Power-ups and abilities, such as the Grappling Beam, allow Samus to reach previously inaccessible areas. Her health, stock of weapons and a gridded mini-map are displayed on the top of the screen.

Super Metroid is a 2D side-scrolling action-adventure game, which primarily takes place on the fictional planet Zebes from the original game—a large, open-ended world with areas connected by doors and elevators. The player controls Samus Aran as she searches the planet for a Metroid that has been stolen by Ridley, the leader of the Space Pirates. Samus can run, jump, crouch, and fire a weapon in eight directions; she can perform other actions, such as wall jumping—jumping from one wall to another in rapid succession to reach higher areas. The "Moon Walk" ability, named after the dance move of the same name, allows Samus to walk backwards while firing or charging her weapon.

Throughout the course of the game, the player can acquire power-ups that enhance Samus's armor and weaponry, as well as grant her special abilities, allowing them to gain access to areas that were previously inaccessible. The Morph Ball (Note: The game refers to the item as the "Morphing Ball".) allows Samus to curl into a ball and roll into tight places; in this form, she can plant bombs once the Bomb power-up is acquired. The Spring Ball adds the ability to jump while in Morph Ball form. The Speed Booster can be used to run at high speeds and destroy barriers and enemies. The Hi-Jump Boots allow for a higher jump, and the Space Jump allows Samus to jump continuously in midair. The Grapple Beam can be used to swing across open areas. The X-ray Scope is used to see hidden items and passages.

The heads-up display shows Samus's health, the supply mode for Reserve Tanks, icons that represent weapons, and a map display showing her location and its surroundings. The inventory screen allows the player to enable and disable weapons and abilities. While the beam weapons can be combined, the Spazer and Plasma beams cannot be used simultaneously. At the game's end, Samus obtains the Hyper Beam, a powerful weapon generated by the energy given to her by the "Super Metroid", the matured version of the larval creature that she seeks. The backup units called Reserve Tanks can be used automatically when Samus's health is depleted. The automap helps the player navigate the different areas, and map computers in each area reveal unexplored areas. To save their progress, the player must use save stations located around the planet. Players can also save and recharge their health and ammunition at Samus's gunship.

Super Metroid has three endings based on the time taken to complete it, which determine whether Samus poses with or without her suit. The best ending is achieved when the game is completed under three hours. If the player rescues the Dachora and the Etecoons, friendly creatures encountered by Samus, they are shown leaving the planet in the distance.

== Plot ==
Samus Aran brings the last Metroid to the Ceres space colony for scientific study. Investigation of the specimen, a larva, reveals that its energy-producing abilities could be harnessed for the good of civilization. Shortly after leaving, Samus receives a distress call alerting her to return to the colony immediately. She finds the scientists dead, and the Metroid larva stolen by Ridley, leader of the Space Pirates. Samus escapes during a self-destruct sequence and follows Ridley to the planet Zebes. She searches the planet for the Metroid and finds that the Pirates have rebuilt their base there.

After defeating three bosses in various regions of Zebes, Samus confronts Ridley in his lair and defeats him, only to discover that the capsule containing the Metroid larva has been shattered and the larva is missing. She then heads for Tourian, the heart of the Space Pirates' base, and fights several Metroids that have reproduced. Samus is then ambushed by the Metroid larva, which has grown to enormous size. It attacks and nearly kills Samus, but relents at the last moment. As Samus was present at its hatching on SR388, the Metroid has imprinted on Samus, and recognizes her as its "mother".

Samus fights a resurrected Mother Brain, the biomechanical creature that controls the Zebes systems. Mother Brain overpowers Samus, but the Metroid larva intervenes, crippling Mother Brain and healing Samus. Mother Brain rises again and kills the Metroid, but upon death, the Metroid gives Samus the Hyper Beam, a powerful weapon strong enough to kill Mother Brain. Samus then escapes Zebes as it self-destructs.

== Development ==
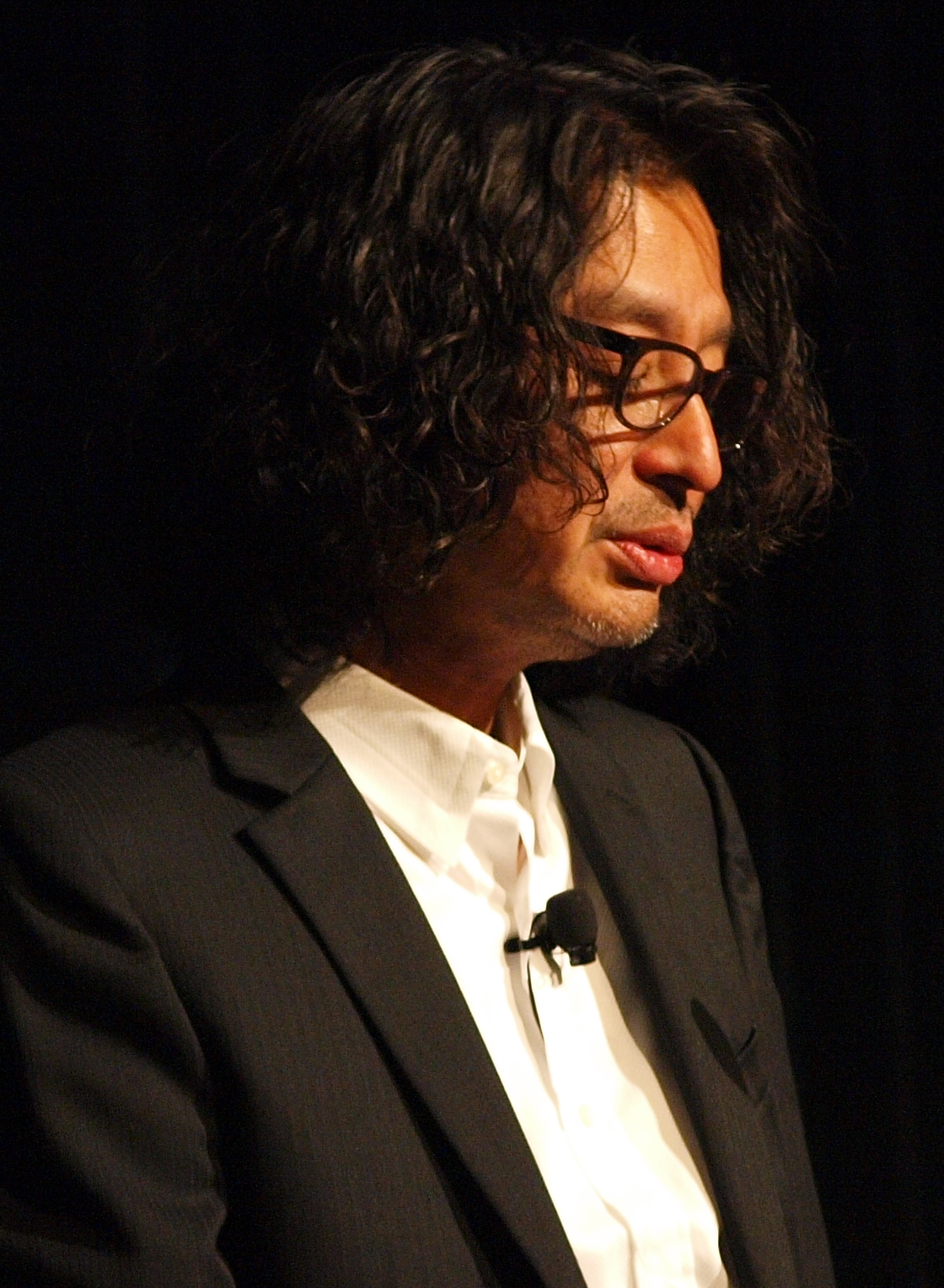
Yoshio Sakamoto, the director and writer of Super Metroid, at the 2010 Game Developers Conference

Super Metroid was developed by Nintendo R&D1 with a staff of 15 managed by Gunpei Yokoi. It was written and directed by Yoshio Sakamoto, and produced by Makoto Kano. Intelligent Systems, who co-developed the original Metroid with R&D1, handled the programming. The opening was narrated by Dan Owsen, a Nintendo of America employee.

Super Metroid was released almost a decade after the original Metroid. Sakamoto said: "We wanted to wait until a true action game was needed. [...] And also to set the stage for the reappearance of Samus Aran". It took half a year for Nintendo to approve the project, and two further years to develop.

The developers' primary goal was to make a "good action game". It is the first Metroid game to let Samus fire in all directions while moving. It is among the first open world games with a map feature, which shows the outlines of rooms and indicates important locations and items. The team wanted to create a large map, but found it difficult to organize the amount of graphic data involved, and so broke it into smaller parts. Areas from previous Metroid games were included to create a sense of familiarity.

Shortly before the game's release, the North American Entertainment Software Rating Board, a self-regulating organization, was formed in response to the increasing violence in games such as Mortal Kombat (1992). Asked whether he thought the controversy would cause a backlash for Super Metroid, Sakamoto explained that Samus's purpose is to maintain peace in the galaxy, saying: "It's not violence for the sake of violence". The game was demonstrated at the Winter 1994 Consumer Electronics Show, and was named the best Super NES game at the show by GamePro. A commercial for the game was produced by 21 Incorporation and Shirogumi and filmed at Daiei Studio.

=== Audio ===
The music was composed by Kenji Yamamoto and Minako Hamano, and uses 16-bit versions of music from previous games. The Super NES's sound hardware allowed the playback of samples simultaneously on eight channels, as opposed to three PSG channels and one noise channel of the NES. Yamamoto decided that rich and expressive sounds, such as a female chorus, would be required to portray the setting realistically. He composed the main theme by humming while riding his motorcycle from work.

Yamamoto also served as a sound programmer, and wrote a program that sends sound data to the audio chip. He also created sound effects, including those created for an infant Metroid to convey different emotions. The simultaneous roles as a composer, a sound programmer and a sound effect creator gave Yamamoto ideas to produce a distinct Metroid soundtrack "with a sound programmer's ear, with a sound effect creator's ear, and with the approach methodology and theory of a composer". The arrangements and remixes of the game's themes were used in Metroid Prime and its sequels, because Yamamoto wanted to satisfy old Metroid fans, describing it as a "present" for them. Hamano recorded a screaming voice clip for Samus when she dies, but it was cut due to sounding "too sexual".

A soundtrack album, Super Metroid: Sound in Action, was published by Sony Records on June 22, 1994. It contains 38 tracks and has a running time of 58:49. It includes the original Metroid soundtrack by Hirokazu Tanaka, and additional tracks arranged by Yoshiyuki Ito and Masumi Ito.

== Release ==
The game was released by Nintendo in Japan on March 19, 1994, in North America on April 18, and in Europe on July 28. It was distributed on a 24-megabit cartridge. It was re-released through the Nintendo Power service in Japan on September 30, 1997. Super Metroid became available as a Wii Virtual Console game in North America on August 20, 2007, in Japan on September 20, and in Europe on October 12. In Super Smash Bros. Brawl, it is one of the trial games available in the "Masterpieces" section, which uses Virtual Console technology to emulate older hardware and have time constraints. The game was released on the Wii U Virtual Console in May 2013, initially available during the trial campaign for a cheaper price before reverting to its regular price the next month. The New Nintendo 3DS-specific Virtual Console also received the release in April 2016. In September 2017, Nintendo released the Super NES Classic Edition, which included Super Metroid among its games. Super Metroid and other Super NES games were added to the Nintendo Classics service in September 2019.

== Reception ==
Reception

Aggregate score
Aggregator	Score
GameRankings	97%

Review scores
Publication	Score
AllGame	4.5/5
Aktueller Software Markt	10/12
Consoles +	91%
Computer and Video Games	91/100
Edge	8/10
Electronic Gaming Monthly	9/10, 9/10, 9/10, 9/10
Famitsu	8/10, 8/10, 8/10, 8/10
Game Informer	9.5/10
Game Players	97%
GameSpot	8.5/10
Hyper	94%
IGN	9.5/10
Jeuxvideo.com	19/20
M! Games	95%
Mega Fun	90%
Nintendo Life	10/10
Official Nintendo Magazine	92/100
Player One	94/100
Super Play	92%
Total!	94%
Video Games (DE)	80%
Games World	94/100
Super Action	93%
Super Gamer	95/100

Super Metroid received highly positive reviews, being one of the highest rated games on review aggregator website GameRankings. Famitsu reviewers complimented the game comparing it to the Legend of Zelda series for its quality in exploration and that the difficulty was just right. Chris Slate of the Game Players video game magazine thoroughly enjoyed Super Metroid, claiming that it "easily lives up to everyone's high expectations". He was satisfied with how Nintendo mixed "smooth", "complex" gameplay, with "state-of-the-art" graphics and sound. Slate found the newly added auto-mapping feature something that the player really needed, saying that it was the only feature in Super Metroid that the original Metroid should have had. Slate said that action fans will not miss Super Metroid, but also remarked that due to the large space available to explore and numerous secrets, the player will have to play through several times even after they have beaten it. Nintendo Power mentioned that the game "may well be the best action adventure game ever", calling it the "wave of the future", and they praised the game's graphics, sound, and controls. Electronic Gaming Monthly gave Super Metroid their "Game of the Month" award, comparing it favorably to the original Metroid and applauding the graphics, the many weapons and items available, and the music. Each of the four reviewers gave it scores of nine out of ten. GamePro criticized the controls as often awkward or difficult and said that many of the power-ups are either lifted from other Super NES games or simple upgrades of other power-ups in the game, but praised the game's massive size along with the auto-mapping feature. Andy Robinson of GamesRadar was pleased with the game's "phenomenal" soundtrack, complimenting it as "one of the best videogame scores of all time".

Super Play critic Zy Nicholson said that Super Metroid is "more of an experience than a game", likening it to watching a late-night movie due to the cinematic structure and atmospheric graphics and sounds. He found the game so compulsive that he was tempted to play "without eating or sleeping". Super Play critic Tony Mott cited the atmosphere as its best aspect, and described it as a mixture of Aliens, Turrican, Exile, and Nodes of Yesod. Mott applauded the refined controls, and called Super Metroid "undoubtedly the best game I've played this year so far" and "a game destined for classic status". James Leach agreed with Nicholson and Mott that Super Metroid was what Mega Man X should have been, containing "everything I look for: playability, hidden tricks, powerful weapons and steamingly evil baddies". All three reviewers in their verdict called Super Metroid one of the best games for SNES platform.

Edge criticized the graphics and short length, but praised Super Metroid as "intensely playable" and "full of memorable moments". IGN called Super Metroid's Virtual Console version a "must-own", commenting that although the game was released nine months after the Wii launched, they felt that it was worth the wait. For the player who had never played Super Metroid, IGN claims that they owe themselves as gamers to "finally find out about what you've been missing all these years". In his review for GameSpot, Frank Provo found it "absolutely astonishing that Nintendo let 13 years go by before making Super Metroid readily available again", but considered the most important thing was that the player "can now play this masterpiece without having to track down the original Super Nintendo Entertainment System cartridge or fumble with legally questionable emulators". Despite admitting that the Virtual Console version was essentially "nothing more than a no-frills, emulated version of a 13-year-old SNES game" that was no longer cutting-edge, he was still pleased with it and reiterated his belief that Super Metroid is "one of the best 2D action adventure games ever produced".

=== Sales ===
In Japan, Super Metroid was the ninth-best-selling video game of 1994, with 531,000 copies sold that year. In North America, despite receiving critical acclaim, Rus McLaughlin of IGN said that Super Metroid arrived at a time when the lifecycle of SNES platform was coming to an end. Robinson similarly noted that, in a series tradition, the game was released at wrong place and time. With the help of strong marketing from Nintendo, Super Metroid sold well in North America, topping the Super NES sales chart in May 1994. A year after its release, Nintendo placed it on their Player's Choice marketing label. By late 2003, the game had shipped 1.42 million copies worldwide.

=== Accolades ===
Super Metroid received several awards and honors. Electronic Gaming Monthly named Super Metroid a Game of the Month for May 1994, gave it an Editors' Choice award, awarded it as the Best Action Game of 1994, and named it the best game of all time in 2003. (Note: The magazine's 1997 listing of the best games of all time gave it the slightly more modest title of 6th best game of all time.) IGN ranked Super Metroid 3rd (2003), 10th (2005) and 7th (2007) in its top 100 games of all time lists. Likewise, IGN readers ranked the game 11th in its top 99 games of all-time list in 2005, and 4th in its top 100 games in 2006. Richard George of IGN also ranked Super Metroid 3rd in its top 100 SNES games, crediting its "flawless action, impeccable level design, out-of-this-world atmosphere, a totally badass heroine and an enormous overworld to explore". GamesRadar named Super Metroid the best SNES game of all time, while Nintendo Power named it the best game in the Metroid series, beating out Metroid Prime and Metroid: Zero Mission. GamePro listed Super Metroid as one of the fifteen must-play retro games on the Wii. Game Informer placed the game 29th on their top 100 games of all time in 2001. In 2018, Complex listed the game 3rd on their "The Best Super Nintendo Games of All Time". They opined that Super Metroid is "tour de force from Nintendo" and described the gameplay as perfect. In 1995, Total! rated the game 17th on its "Top 100 SNES Games" list. In 1995, Flux listed Super Metroid 62nd in their "Top 100 Video Games" list. They praised the game for its challenging gameplay and haunting atmosphere, although they felt that it is too similar to its predecessor.

== Legacy ==
Super Metroid is often regarded as one of the greatest video games of all time. Jeremy Parish of USgamer wrote that Super Metroid is a "game you can return to time and again and always come away with some fresh insight or observation". Chris Hoffman of Nintendo Power wrote that Super Metroid is "truly one of the best", noting that the game "set a new standard for side-scrolling adventure games." Andrew Webster of Ars Technica found the game's atmosphere impressive, and noted that the developers had perfected the aspect on solitude, a concept introduced in the first Metroid game. Game Informer writer Joe Juba cited the game's ending as "one of the most memorable and empowering moments in gaming history". In 2009, Official Nintendo Magazine called the game "challenging, deep and undeniably epic", placing it 24th on a list of the greatest Nintendo games.

As Super Metroid gives the player awards based on how long it took them to complete the game, and because its open-ended structure lends well to sequence breaking, it has become a popular choice for speedrunning, a style of play in which the player intends to complete the game as quickly as possible. Super Metroid, alongside Konami's 1997 game Castlevania: Symphony of the Night, is also credited for establishing the "Metroidvania" genre. It was cited as an influence on other Metroidvania games, including Shadow Complex and Axiom Verge.

Several ROM hacks were released by fans, which added new features to the game. Super Metroid: Redesign, created by "drewseph" in 2006, features new items, expanded areas and modified physics. In 2011, a Japanese hacker named "SB" released, Metroid: Super Zero Mission, which intends to combine elements from Super Metroid and Metroid: Zero Mission. Later hacks, such as Hyper Metroid by "RealRed" and Super Junkoid by "P. Yoshi", add altered game mechanics, graphics and new stories.

=== Sequels ===
Nintendo did not release another Metroid game for eight years, as the series had not matched the success of the Mario and Legend of Zelda franchises. Yokoi left Nintendo in August 1996, amid the failure of the Virtual Boy, and died in a car accident in October 1997.

Fans eagerly awaited a Metroid game for the Nintendo 64 (N64). According to Nintendo producer Shigeru Miyamoto, Nintendo did not develop a Metroid game for the N64 as they "couldn't come out with any concrete ideas". Sakamoto said he could not imagine how the N64 controller could be used to control Samus. Nintendo approached another company to make an N64 Metroid, but the offer was declined because the developers thought they could not make a game to equal Super Metroid.

The Metroid series returned in late 2002, when Nintendo released Metroid Fusion, a 2D sequel developed for the Game Boy Advance by Nintendo R&D1, and Metroid Prime, a first-person game developed for the GameCube by American developer Retro Studios, and the first Metroid game to use 3D graphics. Both Fusion and Prime garnered acclaim, with Prime winning several Game of the Year awards and receiving three sequels. In 2010, Metroid: Other M was released, taking place between the events of Super Metroid and Fusion.
