= Castaway Paradise =

2015 simulation video game

- Developer: Stolen Couch Games
- Publishers: Stolen Couch Games & rokaplay GmbH
- Engine: Unity
- Platforms: Facebook; Android; iOS; Windows; Mac OS X; Xbox One; PlayStation 4; Nintendo Switch
- Release: Facebook: WW: 2014; Android: WW: January 9, 2015; Windows: WW: May 19, 2015; iOS: WW: July 02, 2015; Xbox One: WW: July 31, 2018; PlayStation 4: WW: July 31, 2018; Nintendo Switch: WW: April 29, 2021
- Mode: Single-player

Castaway Paradise is a social simulation game created by Dutch indie studio Stolen Couch Games, it launched on Facebook in 2014, iOS on July 2, 2015, Android on January 9, 2015 and on Steam on May 19, 2015. It was released on Xbox One and PlayStation 4 on July 31, 2018. On February 1, 2021, rokaplay GmbH announced that it will release for Nintendo Switch on April 29, 2021.

== Gameplay ==
Just like Animal Crossing, Castaway Paradise follows the player helping the resident animals getting the island into better shape, by repairing its buildings and bridges, and clearing rocks and weeds. The player can do other tasks in the game, such as catching bugs, fish, collecting sea shells, and garbage that washes onshore, all of which can be sold for in-game currency. Players are also able to grow their own flowers and fruit trees, farm their own crops, decorate the island and their home, and decide what their character wears. Villagers will set quests for the player, and there is roster of tasks to do that changes several times a day, through which the player can gain experience points. There are special events and items for sale on specific days, such as holidays.

== Characters ==
The following is a list of characters:

- Viktoria: Mayor of Castaway Paradise; she is a pig.
- Villagers:
  - Angus: During quests Angus sabotages the other islanders in the island.
  - Gustave: He once had his own cooking show when he was 8 years old.
  - Francis: He would much rather be in the sea, he is also in love with Olga.
  - Amelia: She likes to chat with her friends, snacking on bugs.
  - Stevie: A new villager, she is a natural stranger to your island and also likes to go outdoor.

== Downloadable Content ==
There are a total of seven downloadable content packs available, including free theme packs based on "China", "Soccer", "Ranger", "Boutique", and "Hospital", as well as a theme pack based on the Awesomenauts game and a content pack that adds a new NPC named Stevie.

== Reviews ==
The PC version of Castaway Paradise received positive reviews. Gamezebo gave the iOS version a 3.5/5, citing an "endless amount of quests, collectibles, and gameplay even if you don't spend a dime." Steam was critically positive with 126 positive and 5 negative reviews. The PlayStation 4 version of the game received mixed reviews, ranging from 85/100 from PSU to 50/100 from The Sixth Axis. It currently has a metascore of 68.
