= Tomodachi Life (video game) =

2013 video game

- North American cover art
- Developer: Nintendo SPD
- Publisher: Nintendo
- Director: Ryutaro Takahashi
- Producer: Yoshio Sakamoto
- Programmers: Masanori Nakagawa; Eisaku Nakae
- Artist: Mai Okamoto
- Composers: Daisuke Matsuoka; Asuka Ito
- Series: Tomodachi Life
- Platform: Nintendo 3DS
- Release: JP: April 18, 2013; NA/EU: June 6, 2014; AU: June 7, 2014; KOR: July 17, 2014
- Genre: Social simulation
- Mode: Single-player

Tomodachi Life, known in Japan as Tomodachi Collection: New Life, (Note: トモダチコレクション 新生活, Tomodachi Korekushon: Shin Seikatsu) is a 2013 social simulation video game developed and published by Nintendo for the Nintendo 3DS. It is the second entry in the Tomodachi Life series following the Japan-exclusive Nintendo DS title Tomodachi Collection (2009). The game follows the day-to-day interactions of customizable avatars known as Miis residing on an island. Overseen by the player, they build relationships with one another and request help with problems. Tomodachi Life is nonlinear; the player's only goal is to maintain their Miis' happiness.

Much of Tomodachi Collection's staff returned to produce the sequel, including director Ryutaro Takahashi. The team sought to create a sociable and warm atmosphere within Tomodachi Life, wanting to inspire players to observe their real-world relationships more positively by way of the Miis. While the game was initially planned to retain the exact graphics of Collection, the team, led by art director Mai Okamoto, chose to rework its visuals to achieve a "next-generation" feel.

Tomodachi Life was initially released in Japan on April 18, 2013. Unlike its predecessor, Nintendo released the game abroad. American and Japanese developers worked to develop enhanced text-to-speech components for several years. Certain imagery native to Japan, currencies, and specific Mii animations were adjusted to better reflect foreign cultures; this stage of localization took over a year. Overseas editions were released on June 6, 2014, in North America and Europe; June 7, in Australia; and July 17, in South Korea.

Tomodachi Life sold over 6.73 million copies worldwide by March 2025, making it one of the best-selling 3DS games. It received generally mixed reviews; critics praised its humor and overall charm but took issue with perceived repetitive gameplay and lack of user control. The inability for Miis to enter same-sex relationships was criticized by reviewers and became the subject of online controversy. In the years following its release, Tomodachi Life attracted a cult following among audiences through viral social media posts depicting outlandish Mii interactions. A sequel for the Nintendo Switch, Tomodachi Life: Living the Dream, was released on April 16, 2026. Among other customization additions, the player can manually select their Miis' romantic preferences, permitting same-sex pairings.

== Gameplay ==
A screenshot of a Mii, who is wearing a hamster costume and currently has a problem, inside their apartment

Tomodachi Life is a social simulation game that centers on the everyday lives of Miis who reside on an island, with the player acting as an external observer. Miis are user-customizable avatars whose features are manually adjusted to create caricatures of real-world people or fictional characters. Such features include face shapes, head hair, facial hair, eyes, noses, mouths, and glasses. The player can either create Miis from scratch, import them from the 3DS's built-in Mii Maker application, or scan a specialized QR code attached to an existing Mii. While constructing Miis, the player assigns them a personality by selecting various temperament attributes. Miis speak through robotic text-to-speech voices that can be manually altered. Much of the game's interactivity, such as interacting with the Miis and navigating the island, comes in the form of physically tapping the 3DS's touchscreen. Time on the island passes parallel to that set on the 3DS's internal clock.

Gameplay begins with the player naming the island and creating a Mii look-alike, who is intended to visually resemble the player. The Miis, including the player's look-alike, populate an apartment, which is limited to 100 residents. By continuously adding Miis and completing miscellaneous objectives, additional buildings, shops, and attractions throughout the island become available. These include food and clothing vendors, a concert hall for them to perform live music, and a café. In-universe news broadcasts periodically occur to inform the player of events on the island.

Miis can autonomously form friendships or engage in sporadic conflict, the latter of which the player can indirectly remedy. A Mii can harbor romantic feelings for another Mii of the opposite gender and similar age, which can lead to dating and eventual marriage. Married couples can have children; once the child grows up, the player can either move them to Mii Apartments or dispatch them via the 3DS's StreetPass mechanic (Note: StreetPass is a built-in mechanic for the 3DS that allows a console to wirelessly exchange player data between other 3DS consoles in the immediate area; such player data includes Mii characters.) to appear on other players' islands.

Tomodachi Life has no definitive end condition. The player's primary objective is to continuously maintain each of their Miis' happiness, which is indicated by a personalized meter. They will randomly notify the player of a particular problem they have. These issues range from requesting food or clothing, soliciting relationship guidance, and asking to compete in simple minigames. Appeasing them increases their happiness gauge, awarding the player with in-game currency usable for purchasing items. This currency is also obtained through daily donations from the Miis and selling valuables at a pawn shop. Each Mii has a level that goes up every time their personal happiness meter is completely filled, upon which the player gives them a present. The player can eavesdrop on the Miis' dreams while they sleep at night.

== Development and release ==
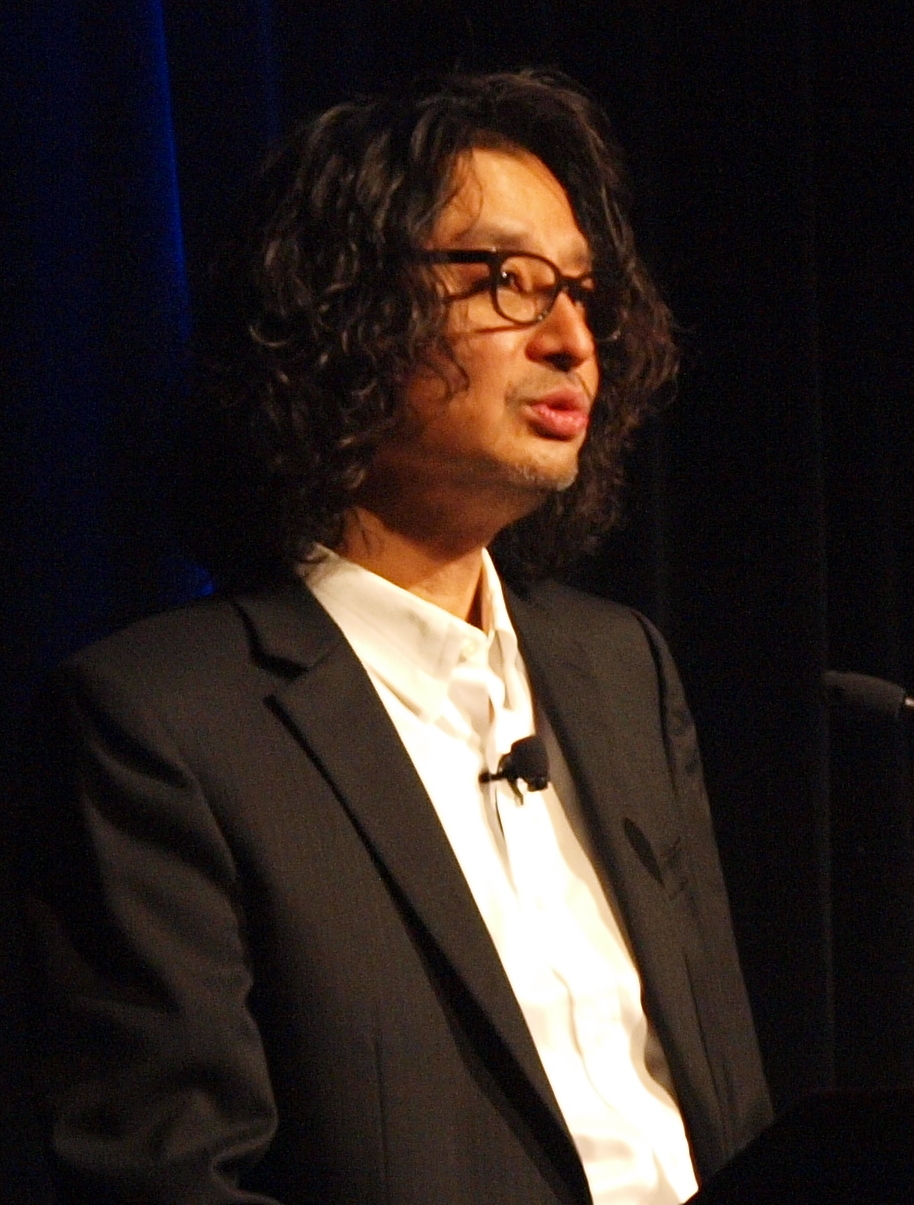
Producer Yoshio Sakamoto in 2010

Tomodachi Life was developed by Nintendo SPD as a direct sequel to Tomodachi Collection (2009). Many of Tomodachi Collection's key developers returned to work on the sequel, known in Japan as Tomodachi Collection: New Life, including director Rytaro Takahashi. Eisaku Nakae, the main programmer of Collection, worked with programmers and designers to establish a clear directional foundation for New Life. This mentality was divergent from that employed during Collection's development, which was a less focused process. Producer Yoshio Sakamoto stated that a primary goal was to create "entertainment which is fun just by watching".

New Life's art direction was refined through trial-and-error. The team initially considered retaining the exact graphical style of Collection, but this was opposed by Shinya Takahashi, the General Manager of Nintendo SPD. He felt the game lacked a "next-generation" feel, prompting New Life's art director Mai Okamoto to reconsider her approach. The team, unclear as to what exactly "next-generation" visuals entailed, experimented with different art styles for approximately six months. They eventually decided on an aesthetic with a balance between enhanced graphics and intentional imperfections. In spite of the art style adjustments, Sakamoto was particular about retaining the Miis' robotic voices from Collection, deeming them integral to the series' identity and players' perception of the characters.

An "idea notebook" was created, allowing developers to freely propose gameplay concepts; over 5,500 ideas were penned in total. Developers held internal competitions to create the most humorous ideas. For instance, the respective teams behind each of the six songs featured in the game's concert hall all attempted to best each other in musical composition, which Takahashi stated became "particularly intense".

One gameplay mechanic introduced in New Life is the ability for married Miis to have children. Developers struggled in conceptualizing how precisely to convey Mii childbearing. Initial ideas included having the Miis lay eggs from which babies would hatch and having the mother's stomach gradually expand; the latter was widely opposed for being "a bit too graphic". In the final product, babies are automatically born. The potential for the game to romantically pair two children, or a child and an adult, with one another, also elicited concern from the team. This was partially remedied with the addition of an "adult spray" item that is applied to underage romantic partners, physically converting them into adults. New Life's StreetPass functionality, allowing child Miis who have grown up to visit others' islands, served as a means for players to grow emotionally attached to their Miis. The development team incorporated an atmosphere of "familial love" to New Life. They hoped the title would inspire players to see their real-world interactions with friends and family in a more genuine, positive light through the Miis.

=== Localization ===
A minigame based on sumo wrestling in the original Japanese release (top). In the North American release (bottom), this minigame instead references football.

Nintendo had previously considered localizing Tomodachi Collection for Western markets. The plan was scrapped primarily because the voice synthesizer used for the Miis, having been originally built for Japanese, could not replicate the phonetic complexities of English. Sakamoto reportedly remained interested in the concept, believing localization could be revisited whenever more powerful hardware became available. For several years after, American and Japanese developers at Nintendo worked together to develop more advanced text-to-speech that could accommodate foreign languages. In late March 2014, Nintendo of Europe launched a survey containing multiple screenshots of what appeared to be localized versions of Tomodachi Collection: New Life in English, French, and Spanish, although an official worldwide release had yet to be confirmed.

Bill Trinen, the Vice President of Product and Player Experience for Nintendo of America, said that a key focus of localization was to elevate the game's appeal for those beyond Japan without sacrificing its core gameplay. Some cultural imagery native to Japan was adjusted; for example, a sumo wrestling minigame in the Japanese release was replaced with football in North America. Determining how to market New Life to customers in North America through a "relatable cultural context" guided this stage of localization, which took over a year. The Japanese word "tomodachi"—literally "friend"—was nevertheless retained in the overseas name to elicit intrigue and make itself distinct. Takahashi spoke of localization as requiring significant alterations to make "the [Miis] feel like real Western people". Such changes included replacing some of the Miis' body gestures with those found in foreign cultures, rendering local currencies, and extensively reviewing the translated dialogue to ensure it felt natural to speakers of other languages. Sakamoto hoped that the game would resonate with players in North America and Europe as it did with those in Japan, stating, "I honestly do not know if Tomodachi Life can be similarly accepted overseas ... however I believe that the emotion of caring for and loving others is universal."

=== Promotion ===
A teaser trailer for a Tomodachi Collection follow-up was shown during a 3DS-centric press conference hosted by Satoru Iwata in 2011. On March 11, 2013, Nintendo announced a sequel to Collection in a Japan-exclusive Nintendo Direct presentation; they also announced a special edition 3DS LL (Note: In Japan, the Nintendo 3DS XL is referred to as the Nintendo 3DS LL.) hardware bundle for the game. In another Direct on April 3, 2013, Nintendo revealed more details on the 3DS sequel, titled Tomodachi Collection: New Life, including the ability to import Mii data from Collection to the sequel.

On April 10, 2014, Nintendo released a dedicated Nintendo Direct presentation for Tomodachi Life to their YouTube channel, featuring Mii caricatures of Nintendo's staff, such as Bill Trinen, Reggie Fils-Aimé, and Iwata. Other Nintendo employees and fictional characters were used to demonstrate the gameplay mechanics, such as Eiji Aonuma, producer of The Legend of Zelda series, conversing with Princess Zelda. On the North American Tomodachi Life website, QR codes for pre-made Miis of celebrities such as Christina Aguilera and Shaquille O'Neal were displayed donning custom clothing. Nintendo of Australia collaborated with singer-songwriter Dami Im to promote the game, with videos featuring her playing Tomodachi Life with her personalized Mii released via YouTube.

=== Release ===
On April 18, 2013, Tomodachi Collection: New Life was released in Japan. It was released alongside a special edition Mint x White Nintendo 3DS LL. On the same day, a booklet in the style of a fashion catalog, starring Miis wearing a variety of in-game clothing, was released as a promotional reward for Club Nintendo members.

On April 10, 2014, Nintendo announced in a Nintendo Direct that Tomodachi Collection: New Life's localized edition would release as Tomodachi Life in North America and Europe on June 6. In May, a playable demo of the game was distributed to Platinum members of Club Nintendo in North America, the data of which could be transferred to the final version to acquire a bonus in-game item. In North America, it released alongside the Sea Green color variant for the Nintendo 2DS. Tomodachi Life would later release on June 7, 2014, in Australia and July 17, in South Korea.

== Reception ==
=== Critical response ===
Reception

Aggregate scores
Aggregator	Score
Metacritic	71/100
OpenCritic	50% recommend (Note: Based on 41 reviews)

Review scores
Publication	Score
Electronic Gaming Monthly	7/10
Eurogamer	5/10
Famitsu	9/10, 9/10, 9/10, 9/10
Game Informer	7/10
GameRevolution	3/5
GameSpot	7/10
GamesRadar+	4/5
IGN	8.4/10
Nintendo Life	8/10
Polygon	7.5/10

Tomodachi Life received "mixed or average" reviews according to review aggregate site Metacritic. Fellow aggregator OpenCritic gave the game a "fair" rating, with 50% of critics recommending the title. Tomodachi Life was nominated for Best Family Game at The Game Awards 2014 and the Use of Sound, New IP category by the National Academy of Video Game Trade Reviewers (NAVGTR) at its 2014 awards ceremony. In the years following Tomodachi Life's release, it attained a cult following among audiences. Scott McCrae of GamesRadar+ attributed its popularity to viral social media posts of outlandish events involving users' Miis.

Critics commended the title's humor as quirky and unique. Polygon's Griffin McElroy and Nintendo Life's Damien McFarren applauded the game's humor as its triumph. The in-game cutscenes depicting the Miis interacting with one another were seen by GamesRadar+'s Henry Gilbert as amusing and "well-written", comparing the humor to that of the WarioWare and Rhythm Heaven series. Jose Otero of IGN appreciated that the Miis communicate in intelligible speech, unlike the constructed language featured in fellow simulation series The Sims, having felt that the Miis' dialogue "adds an extra layer of context and dimension" to the virtual world. Sam Machkovech of Ars Technica had conversely mixed opinions on the game's writing, believing it was targeted towards preteens and thus would not appeal to older age groups. Robert Marrujo of Nintendojo enjoyed the exaggerated surreal humor but, like Machkovech, noted it might not appeal to all players. Danny Cowan of Joystiq lauded the ability to input custom lyrics for the songs in the concert hall as versatile and entertaining. Many critics praised the game's status as an informal crossover, with players incentivized to make Miis of friends, celebrities, and fictional characters, as compounding its situational comedy. (Note: Attributed to multiple sources:) Eurogamer's Martin Robinson was more critical, opining that while Tomodachi Life's humor was quirky enough to be "fun to tell others about", it could not single-handedly remedy what he felt were significant gameplay issues.

An overall lack of user agency was criticized, and some felt Tomodachi Life's core gameplay quickly became monotonous. Robinson critiqued the gameplay loop of making islanders happy as exceedingly trite. Gilbert and Cowan thought the minigames were too rudimentary, while McElroy criticized some of them as mechanically frustrating. Daniel Bischoff of Game Revolution felt Tomodachi Life's simple control scheme of tapping the 3DS's touchscreen felt unengaging and detached. This view was shared by Machkovech, who thought that Tomodachi Life would be more suitable as a mobile game, owing to its simple controls. McFarren wrote of a potential lack of appeal for non-casual gamers and also likened it to mobile titles. Reviewers for Famitsu were more positive, perceiving the title's simplistic gameplay as comfortable. Many critics saw the inability to directly control which specific Miis, especially those based on non-fictional people, would enter romantic relationships as jeopardizing the game's focus on imitating real-life interactions.

==== Same-sex relationships ====
Critics lamented the barring of same-sex relationships as needlessly restrictive for player freedom. (Note: Attributed to multiple sources:) Machkovech saw this absence as thematically jarring due to the game's emphasis on interpersonal connections, writing, "If you're gay, Tomodachi [Life] will reinforce feelings of exclusion regularly." Otero felt the lack of same-sex romance was unrepresentative of the cultural climate in the contemporary real world.

Following the announcement of a worldwide release for Tomodachi Life, this impossibility led to controversy among fans online. In May 2013, a rumor emerged that a glitch in the original Japanese version of the game that enabled such relationships was patched by Nintendo. This was refuted by Nintendo in a statement made in April 2014. They explained that same-sex relationships were never possible and that the actual subject of the patch was a different issue regarding relationship data being corrupted when transferring existing Miis from Tomodachi Collection. The company attributed the misconception to the update being released while Japanese players were sharing screenshots of attempts to circumvent the lack of same-gender romance by assigning Miis a particular sex but giving them the physical appearance of the opposite sex. Trinen, in an interview with IGN, added that he felt the confusion was a mostly Western phenomenon: "As it was reported in Japanese, they had an understanding of what the [data corruption] issue was. The [same-sex workaround] wasn't an issue. It was just a unique way that people were playing the game."

Nintendo stated that it would not be possible to add same-sex relationships to the game after the fact, as they "never intended to make any form of social commentary with the launch of Tomodachi Life", and because it would require significant code alterations unable to be released as a post-game patch. The comment garnered backlash from LGBTQ players, with Tye Marini, a gay Nintendo fan, launching the #Miiquality campaign on social networks. On HBO's Last Week Tonight with John Oliver, comedian John Oliver parodied the controversy by showing animations of various Nintendo characters in same-sex relationships. Nintendo later apologized and stated that if they were to create a third game in the series they would strive to make its gameplay more inclusive. Marini was reportedly pleased with the response, saying, "I don't believe [Nintendo is] a homophobic company at all ... I think that the exclusion of same-sex relationships was just an unfortunate oversight."

=== Sales ===
Tomodachi Life was the best-seller in the Japanese video game market during the week of its release, selling 404,858 units. By September 2014, its global sales reached 3.12 million units. As of March 2025, Nintendo has sold 6.72 million units of Tomodachi Life worldwide, making it one of the best-selling titles for the 3DS.

== Sequel ==
On March 27, 2025, Nintendo announced a sequel, titled Tomodachi Life: Living the Dream, via a Nintendo Direct presentation. The sequel released for the Nintendo Switch on April 16, 2026, and is also compatible with the Nintendo Switch 2. Alongside added customization features for Miis' physical appearances, same-sex relationships are permitted, with additional options to make Miis non-binary or aromantic.

== See also ==
- Animal Crossing – a Nintendo franchise with similar game design
- Miitomo – a defunct free-to-use smartphone application featuring Miis that was headed by key developers from Tomodachi Life
- Miitopia – a role-playing game featuring Miis, which can be imported directly from Tomodachi Life, that also includes life simulation elements
