= Tomodachi Life: Living the Dream =

2026 video game

- Promotional artwork
- Developer: Nintendo EPD (Note: Additional development by Intelligent Systems and Bandai Namco Studios Singapore and Malaysia)
- Publisher: Nintendo
- Director: Ryutaro Takahashi
- Producer: Yoshio Sakamoto
- Programmers: Naonori Ohnishi; Takaomi Ueno
- Artist: Daisuke Kageyama
- Writer: Noriyuki Sato
- Composers: Toru Minegishi; Shinobu Nagata; Reika Nakai; Kairi Hamada
- Series: Tomodachi Life
- Platform: Nintendo Switch
- Release: April 16, 2026
- Genre: Social simulation
- Mode: Single-player

Tomodachi Life: Living the Dream, known in Japan as Tomodachi Collection: Exciting Life, (Note: Japanese: トモダチコレクション わくわく生活, Hepburn: Tomodachi Korekushon Wakuwaku Seikatsu) is a 2026 social simulation game developed and published by Nintendo for the Nintendo Switch. It is the third entry in the Tomodachi Life series, succeeding the Nintendo 3DS title Tomodachi Life (2013). The game centers on the everyday lives of Miis, customizable avatars, residing on an island as they autonomously develop relationships and solve problems, all overseen by the player. As with prior entries, Living the Dream is nonlinear, with the player's only goal being to maintain their Miis' happiness.

Production on Living the Dream began in 2017, shortly after development concluded on the mobile app Miitomo (2016). Director Ryutaro Takahashi and producer Yoshio Sakamoto became inspired to create a sequel to Tomodachi Life as they felt the 3DS' technical limitations held back the game's scale. Creating avenues for user-generated content was done in an effort heighten its replay value. The Miis' character designs were adjusted through trial-and-error; they were ultimately made more cartoonish, while their robotic voices from previous installments were retained with the intent to maintain a distinct personality.

Leading up to its release, fans and critics praised Living the Dream's elevated inclusivity for LGBTQ people, particularly its addition of same-sex relationships, compared to its predecessor. It was released worldwide on April 16, 2026. Living the Dream received generally favorable reviews; its customization options and humor were praised, while its gameplay elicited mixed responses for perceived repetitiveness. The game's lack of online functionality, particularly screenshot and Mii sharing, was met with criticism. Living the Dream has sold 8.83 million copies as of September 30, 2026, making it the best-selling Tomodachi Life installment.

== Gameplay ==
A Mii with a friendship problem, indicated by an orange thought bubble

Tomodachi Life: Living the Dream is a social simulation game that revolves around the everyday lives of Miis who reside on a remote tropical island. Miis are user-customizable avatars whose features are manually adjusted to create caricatures of real-world people or fictional characters. Such features include face shapes, head hair, facial hair, eyes, noses, mouths, and glasses. Upon starting gameplay, the player is tasked with naming their island before creating Miis through a number of outlets. These include making Miis from scratch using the in-game Mii Maker or a set of prompts. Living the Dream's Mii Maker includes additional choices for hair, facial features, and ears. "Face paint" can be applied, allowing the player to manually draw atop the Miis' features. The player adjusts the Miis' gender—male, female, or non-binary—as well as their personal pronouns, and romantic preferences. A personality is assigned by selecting various temperament attributes. Miis talk through robotic speech synthesis, which is modified by using sliders that manipulate its pitch, speed, and other attributes.

Unlike past installments, Miis can freely roam the island and directly interact with other Miis, as well as the environment.

Upon creation, the Miis settle in individual houses; a maximum of 70 Miis can live on the island at once. Living the Dream has no end condition; the player's main objective is to sustain their Mii's happiness. Occasionally, Miis will signal the player that they have a problem. These issues range from requesting food or clothes (yellow), soliciting advice on friendships (orange) or romantic relationships (pink), and aiding them during physical accidents (purple). Miis will periodically ask the player to participate in short minigames. Fulfilling their needs boosts their happiness level, awarding the player with in-game currency that can be exchanged for interior decor, furniture, and infrastructure items.

The player also receives "warm fuzzies" that can be deposited at the island's wishing fountain to increase its level and grant "wishes". Wishes can be exchanged to unlock additional customization options, such as new items and island facilities. A new addition is the Palette House, an island facility which allows players to design clothing, food, pets, interiors, and other miscellaneous items through an in-game drawing interface that can be used with the Switch's controller or touchscreen. Living the Dream also introduces the ability to manually customize the layout of the island. By continuously adding Miis, the island expands, allowing players to place more land. In-universe news broadcasts, held at Mii News, inform the player of recent events on the island, and time in the game passes parallel to that of the real-world clock.

The player can manually grab and relocate Miis, prompting them to interact with other Miis or the environment. The player can optionally enter nicknames for them to call each other, as well as eavesdrop on their dreams while they are asleep. At a Mii's request, the player inputs topics of choice into custom text fields, generating an island-specific "lingo" database. Miis will then randomly utilize certain lingo in their conversations, or when prompted by surroundings. They can be given "little quirks" that augment their everyday behaviors, such as their gait when walking. Outside the player's direct supervision, Miis autonomously wander about the island and interact with each other, forming relationships and sporadic conflict. If one harbors romantic feelings for another, they can confess their love; if the confession is successful, the two become a couple. Marriage can occur after further interactions. Married couples can have children. The player may help remedy an argument between two Miis. This can lead to them either making up, staying enemies, or confessing their love.

== Development and release ==
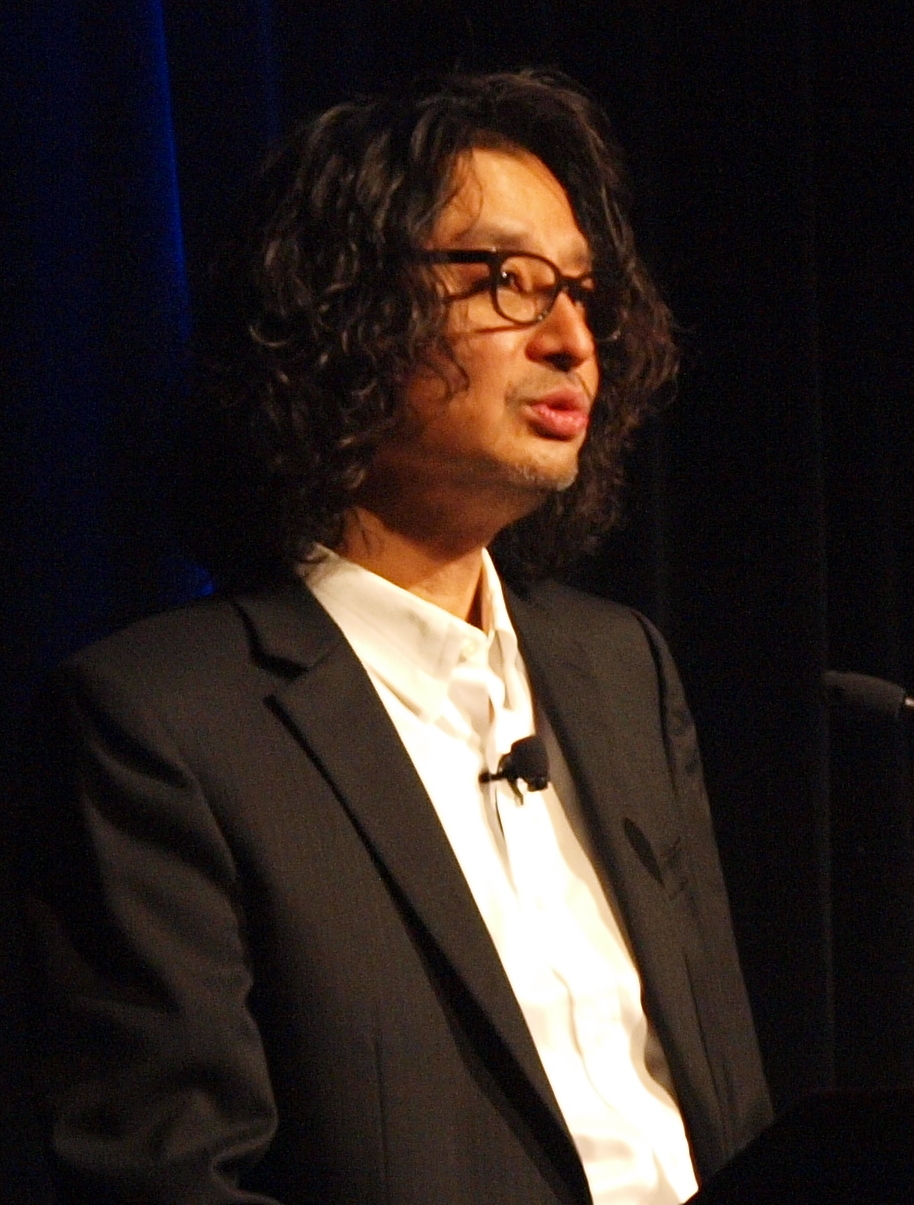
Series producer Yoshio Sakamoto in 2010

Tomodachi Life: Living the Dream was principally developed by Nintendo EPD, with assistance from Intelligent Systems, Bandai Namco Studios Singapore, and Bandai Namco Studios Malaysia. Ryutaro Takahashi and Yoshio Sakamoto returned as director and producer, respectively, while Takaomi Ueno and Naonori Ohnishi collaborated as programming directors. Noriyuki Sato served as lead writer, Ryota Akutsu as lead character designer, Daisuke Kageyama as art director, and Wataru Tanimura as voice programmer. Sound director Toru Minegishi composed the soundtrack, alongside with Shinobu Nagata, Reika Nakai, and Kairi Hamada.

Development on Living the Dream began in 2017 and lasted nine years. After production concluded on the mobile app Miitomo (2016), Takahashi and Sakamoto, both of whom had been attached to Tomodachi Life (2013), felt that the Nintendo 3DS's technical limitations hindered the game's scale. They subsequently began discussions about creating a new installment in the series. Believing that using the current production style of simply adding new items would inevitably turn development into a "quest for quantity" and making the game repetitive, a focus on user-generated content (UGC) was decided on. The Switch's processing power augmented the Mii's social environment, which prompted the use of UGC tools to duplicate inside jokes. They intended on completing work on UGC tools within one and a half years, but a constant stream of ideas resulted in them being finished in six-to-seven years instead. Takahashi hoped that leveraging built-in features with UGC would give the game significant replayability, but wanted the game to remain enjoyable for those that were uninterested in using the UGC tools. The team wanted the in-game world to be more personalized to players. To do so, they made the food items and currency differ, depending on their regional settings. For instance, those in Japan can purchase rice balls or matcha with virtual yen, while in the United States, s'mores can be purchased with virtual dollars. Ueno felt that a fictional currency would have "instantly make the world seem unfamiliar".

The team organized an idea board to share proposed concepts. The developers sought to make the Miis look more visually appealing and initially added new elements to their characters. After Kageyama discussed with Takahashi, Sakamoto, and the preceding production team regarding how Miis are viewed, they opted against altering elements that had long defined them, including their facial features and limbs. They nonetheless re-evaluated each aspect of their design to avoid making them feel outdated. The Miis' appearances were revamped to a "simple, anime-inspired toon-style" reminiscent of how the Miis appear on the box art for Tomodachi Collection (2009), the first installment in the series. Living the Dream's expanded customization options for physical appearances, dating preferences, and gender, as well as the "little quirk" feature, were implemented to better allow players to create any character they desired. Minegishi deliberately processed the Miis' text-to-speech voices to sound robotic, akin to how the characters sounded in previous Tomodachi Life entries. Kageyama discussed with animators on the Mii's movements, arranging them through trial-and-error. They intentionally eliminated "wind-up motions" that resulted in smoother movements and inserted "more bold, memorable movements". During development, the programmers faced difficulties in adjusting the Miis's behaviors. They ultimately set rules for unwanted behaviors, keeping those that were "odd but amusing." The ability to pick up Miis originated as a debug function, but was kept in the final product. The developers endured difficulty in figuring out how Miis would interact with one another, such as creating prototypes of string telephones to let Miis communicate with each other and allowing players to give advice from four choices.

The composition of Living the Dream's soundtrack was approached in a similar manner to previous installments. Minegishi found that capturing the unique musical feel of Tomodachi Life was difficult. He characterized the series' musical style as laid-back and simple on the surface, but ultimately nuanced and intricate. Due to time constraints, the development team was inclined to discard ideas from previous entries, including Mii News. One, younger staffer who was attached to the DS and 3DS games opposed the removal of Mii News specifically and negotiated for its inclusion. According to the USK, the game was mostly complete and evaluated on May 20, 2025.

=== Promotion ===
Tomodachi Life: Living the Dream was announced at the end of a Nintendo Direct presentation on March 27, 2025. The announcement trailer posted to X by Nintendo in Japan became one of their most liked posts, surpassing that of the Nintendo Switch 2 reveal.

Upon Living the Dream's reveal, fans speculated whether same-gender relationships would be included. Neither of its predecessors contained the ability to form relationships with Miis of the same gender, which sparked controversy ahead of the international release of the latter. Despite vocal resentment toward this decision, Nintendo did not add the feature post-launch. They later apologized and stated that if they were to create a third game in the series, they would "strive to design a gameplay experience from the ground up that is more inclusive, and better represents all players." The game's reveal trailer featured a scene with two female Miis interacting during a dream sequence, which fans theorized hinted at additional romance options.

A second Nintendo Direct presentation on September 12, 2025, introduced the creation of Miis and their interactions. It revealed the initial release window for the second quarter of 2026. A 22-minute Direct presentation focused on the game premiered on January 29, 2026. The presentation included demonstrations for Mii creation tools, locations, island customization, and romantic relationships and confirmed that the options for gay, bisexual, aromantic, and non-binary Miis would be present in the game. Different videos were also broadcast in North America, Europe, and Japan featuring a different cast of Mii characters.

Hugh Morris, a jester-themed Mii exclusive to the American trailer whose name resembles the word humorous, was met with acclaim by critics. In other regions, different Mii characters gained popularity, such as Bubbles and Kirishima, who appeared in the European and Japanese Nintendo Directs respectively. A week after this Direct aired, the soundtrack for Tomodachi Life on the 3DS was added to the Nintendo Music streaming service.

=== Release ===
A demo was released on March 25, 2026, giving access to a limited set of features from the retail version. Progress established in the demo can be carried over to the retail version. Completing the demo unlocks one of six color variants of a hamster costume.

The game was released for the Nintendo Switch on April 16, 2026. It was the last game offered for the Switch Game Vouchers program the day prior to its discontinuation, with the vouchers being unavailable to purchase after January 30, 2026. Pre-orders in the United Kingdom included a themed magnetic photo frame. In Japan, pre-orders included bonus accessories depending on the retailer purchased, including stickers of Miis, keychains, and a microfiber cloth. On the same day as the game's release, ten music tracks were added to Nintendo Music as a "special release".

== Reception ==
=== Pre-release ===
Fans and gaming journalists praised the inclusion of same-sex relationships and non-binary Miis in Tomodachi Life: Living the Dream. Publications such as Checkpoint Gaming and The Daily Dot commented that the additions were well-received by a majority of fans. Amelia Zollner writing for Kotaku described the settings as "surprisingly inclusive", being particularly impressed by the explicit use of the term non-binary, calling it "a massive step forward for the developer". They also noted the majority of positive comments from fans during the live stream on YouTube, with Zollner feeling relieved that it was confirmed prior to its release. Alana Hagues writing for Nintendo Life called the addition "a huge win", crediting the developers for sticking to their promise from 2014. Jade King writing for TheGamer expressed her excitement being able to accurately represent her friends and family without needing to do any extra steps like in Tomodachi Life. King was also delighted that Nintendo was inclusive of the LGBTQ+ community, as she felt much of the video game industry was regressing from representing those topics. In her summary, she wrote that "Tomodachi Life is woke now, and [she] couldn't be more delighted".

Upon learning that sharing images directly onto smartphones or social media platforms would be restricted so that "out-of-context scenes" would not be misinterpreted, the decision was met with criticism, and fan response was mostly negative. Dustin Bailey writing for GamesRadar+ called the decision "downright absurd", as they believed sharing character interactions with others was one of the main appeals of the previous installment. Deven McClure writing for Polygon believed that restrictions on image sharing contrasted with the game's emphasis on creativity. Alana Hagues writing for Nintendo Life thought the decision was strange when compared to the additional inclusivity options. She speculated that the company was attempting to avoid replicating a past incident regarding the 3DS messaging application Swapnote, which was disabled due to offensive imagery being distributed. Stephanie Liu of Siliconera thought the decision was made to reduce posts on social media platforms involving controversial people being recreated as Miis. Additionally, the lack of any online functionality was criticized. McClure thought the inability to share Miis online would potentially impact the live streaming community, as well as the game's success overall. Anna Koselke of GamesRadar+ thought it was disappointing compared to other games such as StreetPass Mii Plaza (2011) and Miitopia (2016).

=== Post-release ===
Reception

Aggregate scores
Aggregator	Score
Metacritic	77/100 (Note: Based on 95 reviews)
OpenCritic	74% recommend (Note: Based on 85 reviews)

Review scores
Publication	Score
Eurogamer	3/5
Game Informer	7/10
GamesRadar+	4/5
IGN	7/10
Nintendo Life	7/10
Shacknews	9/10
TechRadar	4/5
Video Games Chronicle	4/5

Tomodachi Life: Living the Dream received "generally favorable" reviews according to review aggregator website Metacritic. Review aggregator OpenCritic assessed that 74% of critics recommended the game.

Critics complimented the game's customization features. Brian Shea of Game Informer described the addition of custom text fields to respond to Miis' questions as creating a "fun Mad Lib-style experience," a sentiment shared by Eurogamer's Alexander Bohn-Elias, who cited what he felt were the Miis' charming personality in animation and voice. Shea said the ability to create custom clothing designs "came in handy when [he] was creating a specific character with an iconic look, like Link or Donkey Kong." Emma-Jane Betts of GamesRadar+ considered the Mii maker to be the most intuitive in the series, lauding the face paint tool and stating that the "only thing stopping you is how patient you are drawing with a controller or your finger." The game's relationship simulation mechanics also drew praise; Chris Scullion of Video Games Chronicle felt that the relationship system was comprehensive, citing features such as assigning real-life relationships to Miis and customizing how they address one another upon becoming best friends or romantic partners. The game was conversely lamented for lacking the concert hall, previously included in Tomodachi Life, that allowed the player to create custom songs that would be sung by the island's residents.

Living the Dream's humor and writing received praise. Multiple critics characterized the gameplay experience overall as comedically surreal, (Note: Attributed to multiple sources:) some having likened its tone to reality television. Bohn-Elias applauded its slapstick comedy and enjoyed the interactable dream sequences and in-universe news broadcasts. Scullion, reviewing the UK English version of the game, found the inclusion of regional slang in Mii dialogue amusing.

To critics, the game became repetitive over time. Writing for Nintendo Life, Alana Hagues wrote that playing the game sometimes felt directionless, even if mitigated somewhat by shorter play sessions. TJ Denzer of Shacknews judged that Living the Dream managed to keep things relatively fresh, but observed that certain Mii interactions recurred more frequently than he desired. Betts argued that fully engaging with the game's customization options was necessary to sustain long-term interest, warning that players who did not would "be left without much of anything to keep hold of [them] long-term". Scullion similarly opined that once the novelty of Living the Dream's offbeat comedy faded, the game became little more than an ordinary life simulator. Denzer described Living the Dream's entertainment value as correlational to the time and effort one would be willing to engage with it. Betts additionally criticized the minigames as trite, desiring a greater variety in both minigames and subjects for her Miis to interact with.

The decision to restrict image sharing and online Mii sharing was also criticized by many reviewers. Bohn-Elias believed that this restriction hampered the game's overall charm. He also felt Living the Dream's potential for online virality, akin to that experienced by its predecessor, would be reduced as users could no longer exchange their "wildest creations". Brian Shea of Game Informer called the decision shortsighted, and noted that removing the online Mii sharing features also removed the "safety net" for players who didn't want to manually create many Miis. Logan Plant of IGN said that, while he had been impressed with the Miis that people had created with the pre-release demo, he felt disappointment knowing that the restriction meant there would be "no way for [him] to get that exact character on [his] island".

Other technical oddities were critiqued. Hagues criticized the functionality of the touchscreen as "weirdly limited" and found the lack of higher frame rates on the Nintendo Switch 2 "a little jarring" considering the Switch 2 received a resolution boost. Bohn-Elias and Wood were similarly critical of the inability to use the Joy-Con 2's computer mouse features in the in-game editor, with Wood calling it "a huge missed opportunity given the number of mechanics that involve drawing".

=== Sales ===
During the month of March 2026, it was at the top of the Amazon pre-order charts in Japan. At launch, Tomodachi Life: Living the Dream topped the sales charts in Japan, selling 565,405 physical copies during its first week according to Famitsu. It similarly topped the UK sales charts in its first week, beating out Capcom's recent release of Pragmata (2026). In France, the game had the best-selling physical launch of 2026 thus far, selling more than 70,000 copies, the amount sold by Resident Evil Requiem (2026). By September 30, 2026, six months after release, Living the Dream sold over 8.83 million copies worldwide, surpassing the sales figure of its predecessor and making it the best-selling Tomodachi Life game to date. Nintendo remarked that Living the Dream had "reached more consumers around the world than [they] anticipated".
