= Singles 2: Triple Trouble =

2005 video game

- Developer: Rotobee
- Publisher: Deep Silver
- Platform: Microsoft Windows
- Release: June 2005
- Genre: Social simulation
- Mode: Single-player

Singles 2: Triple Trouble is a social simulation video game developed by German studio Rotobee and published by Deep Silver in 2005. It is the sequel to the 2004 game Singles: Flirt Up Your Life. The player is responsible for taking care of the characters daily needs such as eating, sleeping, and going to work. The player is also responsible for developing the characters romantic relationships and can progress from being casual acquaintances to having a sexual relationship. There are several characters of either sex with the possibility for a gay/lesbian relationship as well.

== Gameplay ==
In the beginning of a relationship, simple kisses are all the player can do. As the relationship increases, newer options are unlocked.

== Reception ==
Reception

Review scores
| Publication | Score |
|---|---|
| 4Players | 69% |
| GameStar | 66% |
| Jeuxvideo.com | 12/20 |
| PC Games (DE) | 8/10 |
