= Yoshio Sakamoto =

Japanese video game designer (born 1959)

- 坂本 賀勇
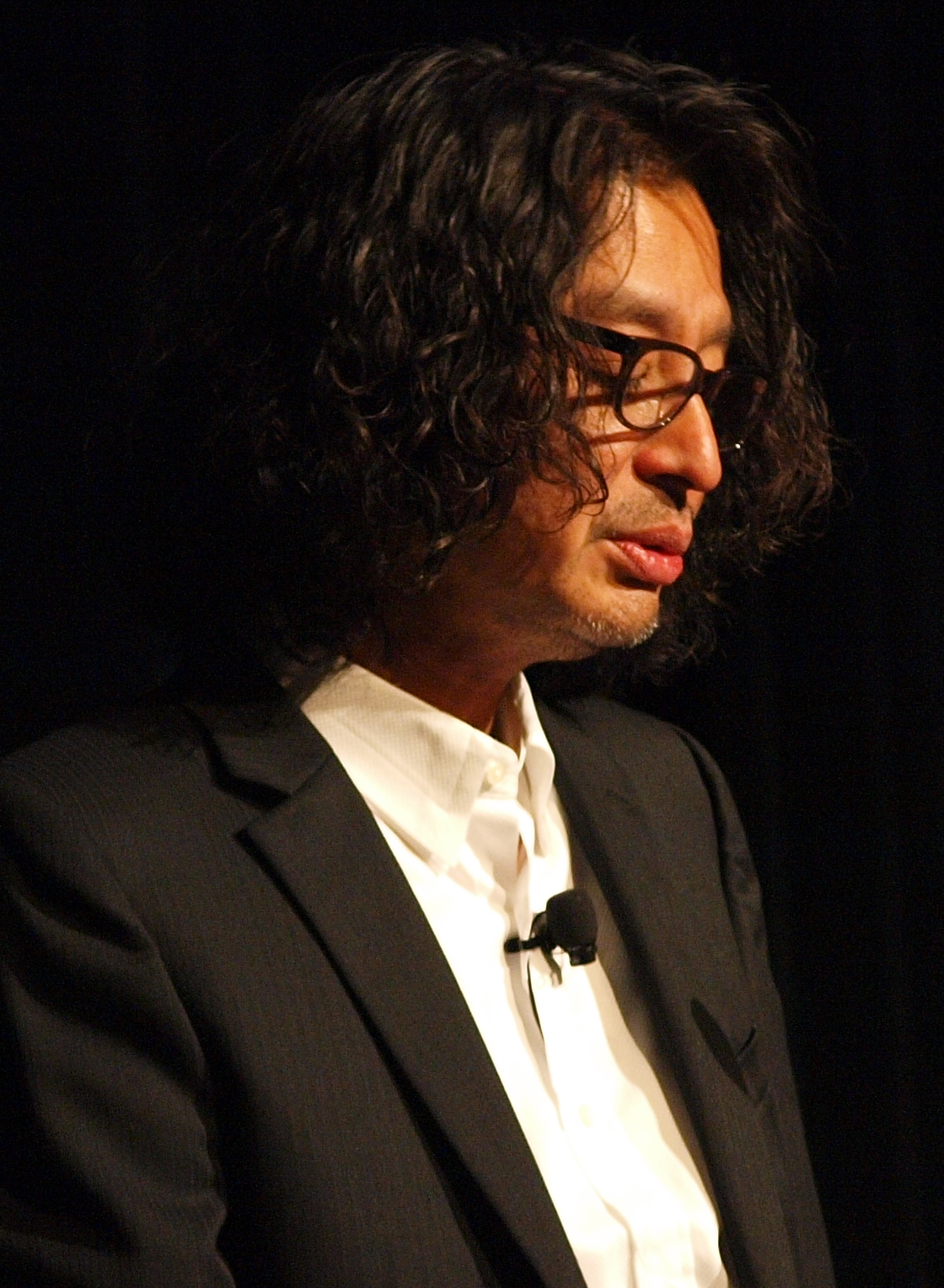
- Sakamoto at the 2010 Game Developers Conference
- Born: July 23, 1959 (age 67); Nara Prefecture, Japan
- Education: Osaka University of Arts
- Occupations: Video game designer, director, producer
- Employer: Nintendo (1982–present)
- Known for: Metroid series Famicom Detective Club series WarioWare series Rhythm Heaven series Tomodachi Life series
- Title: Manager at Nintendo SPD Production Group No. 1 (2004–2012); Deputy Manager at Nintendo SPD (2012–2015); Senior Officer at Nintendo EPD (2015–present)

Yoshio Sakamoto (Japanese: 坂本 賀勇, Hepburn: Sakamoto Yoshio; born July 23, 1959) is a Japanese video game designer, director, and producer. He is a Senior officer at Nintendo EPD.

He has worked at Nintendo since 1982. He has directed several games in the Metroid series and worked on series such as Rhythm Heaven, Tomodachi Life and WarioWare. He is one of the most prominent members of Nintendo's former Research and Development 1 division, along with Gunpei Yokoi and Toru Osawa.

== Career ==
Sakamoto is a key member in the development of the Metroid series. Sakamoto grew up with Nintendo toys, which he felt were inventive. The company hired him in 1982, when he graduated from art college. His first projects at Nintendo were the design of pixel art for the Game & Watch handheld Donkey Kong, and the arcade game Donkey Kong Jr. He turned to the Nintendo Entertainment System afterward, for which he designed the games Wrecking Crew, Balloon Fight and Gumshoe. Sakamoto also was the lead scenario writer and creator of Famicom Detective Club with its first two entries, some of the most influential visual novels in Japan in the 80s.

Sakamoto created characters for Metroid (under the alias 'Shikamoto'), and was a game designer on Kid Icarus. He also directed Super Metroid, Metroid Fusion, Metroid: Zero Mission, Metroid: Other M, and was the producer for Metroid: Samus Returns and Metroid Dread. Sakamoto's design work is also found in Nintendo games including Balloon Kid (1990), Game & Watch Gallery (1997), Wario Land 4 (2001), and the WarioWare series.

=== Philosophy ===
Sakamoto has stated that he wants to live up to public expectations of Nintendo to deliver products similarly unique to those of his youth, describing WarioWare, Inc. as an example. Regarding his professional relationship with Nintendo producer Shigeru Miyamoto, he believes his mission is not to compete with but to "always come up with something very different from what Mr. Miyamoto is likely to do".

== Works ==
| Year | Game title | Role |
|---|---|---|
| 1982 | Donkey Kong (Game & Watch) | Graphic artist |
| 1982 | Donkey Kong Jr. | Graphic artist |
| 1983 | Snoopy | Graphic artist |
| 1983 | Mario's Bombs Away | Graphic artist |
| 1984 | Donkey Kong Circus | Graphic artist |
| 1984 | Vs. Wrecking Crew | Game designer, graphic artist |
| 1984 | Vs. Balloon Fight | Game designer, graphic artist |
| 1986 | Gumshoe | Director, graphic artist |
| 1986 | Metroid | Graphic artist |
| 1986 | Kid Icarus | Game designer |
| 1987 | Nakayama Miho no Tokimeki High School | Director, game designer, scenario |
| 1988 | Famicom Detective Club: The Missing Heir | Game designer, scenario |
| 1989 | Famicom Detective Club: The Girl Who Stands Behind | Game designer, scenario |
| 1990 | Balloon Kid | Director |
| 1992 | X | Director |
| 1992 | The Frog For Whom the Bell Tolls | Scenario |
| 1994 | Super Metroid | Director |
| 1995 | Teleroboxer | Director |
| 1997 | Game & Watch Gallery | Advisor |
| 1997 | BS Tantei Club: Yuki ni Kieta Kako | Producer |
| 1998 | Game Boy Camera | Additional staff |
| 2000 | Trade & Battle: Card Hero | Director, game designer, scenario |
| 2001 | Wario Land 4 | Supervisor |
| 2002 | Metroid Fusion | Chief director, scenario, story |
| 2003 | Wario World | Advisor |
| 2003 | WarioWare, Inc.: Mega Party Game$! | Supervisor |
| 2004 | Metroid: Zero Mission | Director |
| 2004 | WarioWare: Twisted! | Producer |
| 2004 | WarioWare: Touched! | Producer, game designer |
| 2006 | Rhythm Tengoku | Producer, game designer |
| 2006 | WarioWare: Smooth Moves | Producer, game designer |
| 2007 | Picross DS | Supervisor |
| 2007 | Kousoku Card Battle: Card Hero | Producer |
| 2008 | Rhythm Heaven | General producer |
| 2009 | WarioWare D.I.Y. | Producer |
| 2009 | Tomodachi Collection | Producer |
| 2010 | Metroid: Other M | Director, producer, story |
| 2011 | Rhythm Heaven Fever | General producer |
| 2012 | Kiki Trick | Supervisor |
| 2013 | Game & Wario | Producer, game designer |
| 2013 | Tomodachi Life | Producer |
| 2015 | Rhythm Heaven Megamix | General producer |
| 2016 | Miitomo | Producer |
| 2016 | Metroid Prime: Federation Force | Special advisor |
| 2017 | Metroid: Samus Returns | Producer |
| 2021 | Famicom Detective Club: The Missing Heir | Producer, scenario, supervisor |
| 2021 | Famicom Detective Club: The Girl Who Stands Behind | Producer, scenario, supervisor |
| 2021 | Metroid Dread | Producer |
| 2024 | Emio – The Smiling Man: Famicom Detective Club | Producer, game designer, scenario |
| 2026 | Tomodachi Life: Living the Dream | Producer |
