= Social simulation game =

Video game genre involving social interactions

Social simulation games are a subgenre of life simulation games that explore social interactions between multiple artificial lives. Some examples include the SimCity, The Sims, Tomodachi Life and Animal Crossing series. The earliest were created for educational purposes, then gradually evolved to social and entertainment use.

== History ==
=== Influences and origins ===
There were social simulation games before there were video games. The earliest forms being physical cities created for educational purposes made of miscellaneous household items. School teacher, Doreen Gehry Nelson created in-class city building that eventually helped shape the game SimCity and more. Her city simulations allowed students to imagine, build, and re-build a city in their own image incorporating real world learning. The Nelson siblings, Doreen (school teacher) and Frank Nelson (architect), can be accredited for the creation of the roleplaying game, Purium, which was purposed at a 1971 Smithsonian Institution workshop. Later Purium became an inspiration used for the baseline of future social simulation games.

Claire Curtin, an educational software producer, co-designed The Sims with Will Wright and Roxana Wolosenko. The three designers invited skilled teachers like Doreen Nelson to create informational teacher guides to facilitate gameplay in Maxis games. When The Sims was released in 2000, it was referred to as "almost the only game of its kind". But there are several important precursors to The Sims and the social simulation genre. Firstly, one of the game's creators Will Wright acknowledged the influence of Little Computer People, a Commodore 64 game from 1985. The games are similar, although The Sims is described as having a richer gameplay experience. Secondly, Will Wright also acknowledged the influence of dollhouses on The Sims, which have generally also informed the gameplay of this genre.

Animal Crossing was released in 2001 for the Nintendo 64 in Japan. While released towards the end of the life cycle of the Nintendo 64, it developed a following that led to it being ported to the GameCube and released throughout the world. As the game's popularity has surged, this series has also been described as a social simulation game. Story of Seasons, a series that began in 1996 and is often compared to Animal Crossing, has also been described as a social simulation game. Its social simulation elements are derived from dating sims, a subgenre that dates back to the early 1980s, with games such as Tenshitachi no gogo in 1985 and Girl's Garden in 1984.

Since the initial success of these games in the early 2000s, video game journalists have begun to refer to a group of similar games as belonging to the social simulation game genre.

=== Recent history ===
Several other social simulation games have emerged to capitalize on the success of The Sims. This includes several sequels and expansion packs, as well as games like Singles: Flirt Up Your Life with heavy similarities.

== Types ==
=== Farming sim ===
A farming sim is a specific type of social simulation in which the player tends to a farm at the same time they influence game play by interacting with other townspeople. A direct connection can be drawn from early games in the genre such as Harvest Moon (1996) to the more recent Stardew Valley (2016). Other games, such as the Rune Factory series and Harvestella (2022) put a fantasy spin on the genre, while there are also sci-fi examples such as Lightyear Frontier. The 2.0 update of Animal Crossing: New Horizons (2020) added the ability to create a farm and grow produce.

=== City-building sim ===
City-building simulations ask the player to manage, build, and influence how a city evolves over time. SimCity simulates evolution over time by incorporating Jay Forrester's system of using feedback loops and changing variable. Games like SimCity (1989), Caesar III (1989), Pharaoh (1999), and TheoTown (2015) allow players to design the layout and functionalities of the city within the limits of the game. Games like Rollercoaster Tycoon (1999) and Zoo Tycoon (2001) are similar in that players manipulate pre-existing game structures, but in these simulations the goal is to build and influence a theme park sim.

=== Life sim ===
Life simulations involve players creating different avatars or sims, and then playing out different social behaviors in a pre-built simulation. Depending on the variation, there is a level of randomness embedded into gameplay that allows the player to simulate alternate realities for their avatar/sims within the game's story or world. Games like The Sims (2000) allow players to manage a household of sims. Players can design the way their sims look and act by selecting attributes that can influence their allotted gameplay interactions and behaviors. With the goal to interact as these sims in a larger ecosystem of characters.

== Examples ==
- Little Computer People (1985)—by David Crane, published by Activision
- Tenshitachi no Gogo (1985)—One of the earliest dating sims, released for the 16-bit NEC PC-9801 computer.
- Alter Ego (1986)—a personality video game by Activision
- The Money Game series (1988–1989)
  - The Money Game (1988)—a Famicom life simulation about balance love with high finance
  - Wall Street Kid (1989)—the Famicom sequel to The Money Game (The Money Game II: Kabutochou no Kiseki)
- SimCity (1989) - by Maxis and Will Wright
  - SimCity 300 (1999)
  - SimCity 64 (2000) - Japan release only
  - SimCity 4 (2003)
- Jones in the Fast Lane (1990)—by Sierra Entertainment is one of the earliest life simulators.
- My Life My Love: Boku no Yume: Watashi no Negai (1991)—a life simulation for the Japanese Famicom system
- Princess Maker series (1991–2007)—by Gainax
  - Princess Maker (1991)—by Gainax, a raising sim which the player must raise an adoptive daughter until she reaches adulthood. The final result varies from a ruling queen, to an ordinary housewife, to even a prostitute if the player looks after her poorly.
  - Princess Maker 2 (1993)
  - Princess Maker: Legend of Another World (1995)
  - Princess Maker 3: Fairy Tales Come True (1997)
  - Princess Maker 4 (2006)—by GeneX
  - Princess Maker 5 (2007)
  - Princess Maker: Children of Revelation (2025 early access)
- Tokimeki Memorial series (1994–2014)—6 main games and a large number of spin-offs
- True Love (1995)—a Japanese erotic dating sim and general life simulation game where the player must manage the player's daily activities, such as studying, exercise, and employment.
- Persona series (1996–2024)—6 main games and several spin-offs, although the first 3 games do not emphasize this aspect very much.
- Story of Seasons series (1996–2016)—by Marvelous Entertainment, farming simulator, role-playing game, and dating sim rolled into one.
- Shenmue series (1999–2019)
- The Sims series (2000–2014)
  - The Sims (2000)—by Will Wright, published by EA for the PC.
  - The Sims 2 (2004).
  - The Sims 3 (2009).
  - The Sims 4 (2014).
- Animal Crossing series (2001–2020)—a life simulator by Nintendo. It has also been dubbed as a "communication game" by the company as had Cubivore, Doshin the Giant and GiFTPiA.
  - Animal Crossing (2001).
  - Animal Crossing: Wild World (2005).
  - Animal Crossing: City Folk (2008).
  - Animal Crossing: New Leaf (2012).
  - Animal Crossing: New Horizons (2020).
- Real Lives (2001)—an educational life simulator by Educational Simulations where the player is randomly "born" somewhere in the world and often must deal with third-world difficulties such as disease, malnutrition, and civil war.
- Singles series (2003–2005)
  - Singles: Flirt Up Your Life (2003)
  - Singles 2: Triple Trouble (2005)
- Democracy (2005)—a government simulation game that was first developed by Positech Games, with a sequel released in December 2007 and a third game in 2013.
- Eccky (2005)—by Media Republic.
- Façade (2005)—An artificial-intelligence-based interactive story created by Michael Mateas and Andrew Stern.
- Nights series (2005–2008)
  - New York Nights: Success in the City (2005)—a social simulation created and designed by Gameloft released for mobile phones.
  - Miami Nights: Singles in the City (2006)
  - Tokyo City Nights (2008)
- The Idolmaster series (2005–)—an idol raising sim by Namco.
- Kudos (2006)—by Positech Games. There is a 2008 sequel Kudos 2.
- Virtual Villagers series (2006–2010)—by Last Day of Work.
- Tomodachi series (2009–2026)—by Nintendo
  - Tomodachi Collection (2009)
  - Tomodachi Life (2013)
  - Tomodachi Life: Living the Dream (2026)
- Creebies (2010)—by Nokia.
- Life: the Social Game (2011)—a social game inspired by Conway's Game of Life
- Castaway Paradise (2014)
- Stardew Valley (2016)
- Disney Dreamlight Valley (2023)—a social simulation adventure game developed by Gameloft
- InZOI (2025 early access)—published by Krafton, developed by inZOI Studio
- Pokémon Pokopia (2026)

== See also ==
- Dating sim
- List of simulation video games
- Simulated reality
- Social simulation
