= Singles: Flirt Up Your Life =

2003 video game

- Developer: Rotobee
- Publisher: Deep Silver
- Platform: Microsoft Windows
- Release: EU: April 2, 2003; NA: October 5, 2003
- Genre: Social simulation
- Mode: Single-player

Singles: Flirt Up Your Life is a video game developed by German studio Rotobee and published by Deep Silver in 2003.

It is similar to The Sims in that the player is responsible for characters who have to be taken care of, such as by ordering them to eat, sleep, go to work, etc.

The game was available for sale via download from the company's website, with payment required to continue playing after the one-hour time limit expired.

The CD-ROM version sold in the US censored any nudity throughout the game.

== Development ==
The game was banned in Australia due to the game's sexual content.

== Reception ==
Reception

Review scores
Publication	Score
GameSpot	6.2
IGN	7.0

Singles received some middling reviews from critics for being a rip-off of The Sims and the way it offered little challenge, with the player required to simply follow a routine of making the characters progress from making small talk through to professing love then running off to bed together via the simple interaction menus. The 'needs' are also considered fairly inconsequential, with the characters never starving to death even when their 'hunger' need has dropped to zero.

== Sequel ==
An expansion pack with the working title of Singles: Threesomes was announced by publisher Deep Sliver in June 2004 but was never released. A sequel, titled Singles 2: Triple Trouble, was released in June 2005 and featured three housemates instead of two.
