= Metroid: Other M =

2010 video game

- Developers: Team Ninja; Nintendo SPD
- Publisher: Nintendo
- Directors: Yoshio Sakamoto; Yosuke Hayashi; Takehiko Hosokawa
- Producers: Yoshio Sakamoto; Yosuke Hayashi
- Artists: Takayasu Morisawa; Yutaka Saito
- Writer: Yoshio Sakamoto
- Composer: Kuniaki Haishima
- Series: Metroid
- Platform: Wii
- Release: NA: August 31, 2010; JP/AU: September 2, 2010; EU: September 3, 2010
- Genre: Action-adventure
- Mode: Single-player

Metroid: Other M (Note: Japanese: メトロイド アザーエム, Hepburn: Metoroido Azā Emu) is a 2010 action-adventure game developed by Tecmo Koei's Team Ninja and Nintendo and published by Nintendo for the Wii. It is the eighth main Metroid game, taking place between Super Metroid (1994) and Metroid Fusion (2002). (Note: With the 2025 release of Metroid Prime 4: Beyond, Other M currently takes place between Super and Prime 4.) The player controls the intergalactic bounty hunter Samus Aran, who investigates a derelict space station with a Galactic Federation platoon, including her former commanding officer, Adam Malkovich.

The Metroid director and series creator Yoshio Sakamoto approached Team Ninja to develop Other M, while the animation studio D-Rockets handled the cutscenes. The development team employed a simple control scheme to appeal to modern players, and focused on plot and characterization, with extensive cinematics and voice acting. Other M is played from a third-person perspective using only the Wii Remote, and focuses on exploration and combat. It introduces melee attacks which can only be executed when an enemy's health is reduced.

Metroid: Other M received generally positive reviews from critics, who praised its elaborate cutscenes, graphics and action-oriented gameplay, receiving honors from several publications. However, its story was criticized by critics and fans. Despite being the third-best-selling video game in Japan during its first week of release and the ninth best-selling game in North America during September 2010, sales were disappointing for a flagship Nintendo franchise. No new main Metroid games were released until Metroid Dread in 2021.

== Gameplay ==
Samus executes the Lethal Strike on a Ghalmanian.

Metroid: Other M is an action-adventure game with 3D graphics. Players control Samus Aran, a bounty hunter who investigates a derelict space station, the Bottle Ship. The main environment is the vessel interior, known as the Main Sector, along with the other environments that are contained in "sectors" or gigantic spheres within the ship: the Biosphere, a lush, tropical region; the Cryophere, an arctic environment; and the Pyrosphere, a heated, lava-filled area. The gameplay involves solving puzzles to uncover secrets, platform jumping, and shooting enemies. The game unfolds in a linear manner, and the in-game map highlights the next objective.

Other M moves between two perspectives with differing controls, depending on the orientation of the Wii Remote. Normal gameplay features a third-person perspective, where players hold the Wii Remote horizontally. Samus can jump, fire the arm cannon, and turn into a morph ball, which can roll into narrow passages and drop energy bombs. While gameplay is similar to 2D Metroid games, the environments are three-dimensional and movement is not limited to a two-dimensional plane. When the Wii Remote is pointed towards the screen, the angle switches into a first-person perspective, where players can look around, lock onto targets, and fire missiles, but cannot move in this perspective. There are several instances where players will have to constantly switch between play modes; for example, fighting off a horde of flying enemies in third person, while switching to first person to destroy their spawn points. Additionally, the first-person mode is also used in exploration, such as locating hidden items.

Other M is the first game in the Metroid series to feature melee attacks. With well-timed button presses, players can use special techniques, such as the Sense Move, which allows them to dodge enemy attacks, and the Overblast, where Samus jumps on the enemy and fires a charged shot at point-blank range. Unlike other Metroid games, enemies do not drop items, with the restoration of health and ammo performed via use of either the Navigation Booths or the Concentration mechanic. The Navigation Booths can also be used to save progress. While there are power-ups scattered around the Bottle Ship, a few items are already equipped by Samus, but she agrees to wait to use them until commanding officer Adam Malkovich authorizes her to do so. Players can find items that will augment Samus's abilities, such as Energy and Missile Tanks.

As a special feature, players can unlock "Theater Mode"—a two-hour film presentation—after completing the game. Divided into chapters, this film contains every cutscene, along with clips of gameplay footage recorded by the developers for bridging purposes.

== Plot ==
Metroid: Other M takes place after Super Metroid, narratively connecting it to its sequel Metroid Fusion. After awakening in a Galactic Federation facility, Samus Aran departs for space and picks up a distress signal from a derelict vessel known as the "Bottle Ship". Soon after landing, Samus encounters the Galactic Federation 07th Platoon; among the Platoon are Anthony Higgs, an old friend from her military career, and her commanding officer Adam Malkovich. After Samus saves the platoon from monsters, Adam allows Samus to cooperate in their mission, under the condition that she follow his orders. Samus and the 07th Platoon head to the Exam Center in the Biosphere, and learn that the Bottle Ship was conducting research on bioweapons and the person in charge of the project was Dr. Madeline Bergman. After being attacked by a large lizard-like creature, Samus is ordered to follow the monster to the Pyrosphere, but is quickly directed to the Cryosphere to search for survivors. While there, Samus encounters a young woman, but the two are attacked by a soldier piloting an industrial robot. Samus realizes that there is a traitor among the 07th Platoon and decides to call him the "Deleter" until she learns his true identity.

After returning to the Pyrosphere to follow the reptilian creature, Samus discovers that it is actually a juvenile stage of the dragon-like Ridley. Anthony draws Ridley's attention and challenges him, but is seemingly killed. Samus fights Ridley, who subsequently escapes. Samus leaves the Pyrosphere and realizes she cannot contact Adam. She follows the "Deleter" to the Bioweapon Research Center where she meets the same woman from before, who introduces herself as "Madeline Bergman". Madeline reveals that the scientists were propagating the Metroids in the Bottle Ship, reproduced from the remnants of the infant Metroid found on Samus's power suit after her return from the planet Zebes. Madeline adds that the scientists have created a Mother Brain-based artificial intelligence called "MB" in order to control the Metroids, which are hidden in Sector Zero, a recreation of Tourian. Before leaving, Madeline informs Samus that Adam is the creator of the Metroid operation. Samus heads to Sector Zero, but Adam shoots Samus in the back and stops her from entering, warning her that the Metroids in Sector Zero cannot be frozen. When Samus asks Adam why he is credited as the Metroid military report's creator, he explains that the Galactic Federation headquarters requested him to write the report. In his report he explained why the operation should not be attempted due to potential dangers. Adam states his intention to enter Sector Zero and to destroy it; he explains that, by causing enough damage to the sector, it will detach from the Bottle Ship before self-destructing, thus destroying MB and the Metroids. Before sacrificing himself to destroy Sector Zero, Adam commands Samus to secure a survivor in "Room MW" of the Bioweapon Research Center and to defeat Ridley.

Samus returns to the research center, where she finds the body of one of the 07 Platoon members, and the mummified remains of Ridley. She also finds a survivor, and defeats a Queen Metroid. Samus pursues the survivor, who reveals herself to be the real Madeline. Madeline explains that the woman Samus met earlier was in fact MB, an android created from Mother Brain's genetic material to establish control over the Metroids. Feeling betrayed by the scientists and Madeline, MB telepathically commanded the Space Pirate special forces to attack those on board and had managed to propagate the Metroids in Sector Zero. Samus and Madeline are then confronted by MB herself. A group of Federation troopers rushes into the room, and MB summons the Bottle Ship's most dangerous creatures to attack. Samus clears away these monsters to allow Madeline to shoot at MB with an ice cannon, leaving her defenseless and helpless for the Federation soldiers to finish her off, ending Mother Brain's reign of terror once and for all. The colonel compliments Samus's efforts but orders a soldier to escort Samus back to her ship; the soldier reveals himself as Anthony, the only surviving member of the 07th Platoon. Samus, Madeline and Anthony leave for the Galactic Federation headquarters in Samus's gunship.

Days after the incident, Samus returns to the Bottle Ship to retrieve something that is left there. After battling Phantoon, one of the monsters Samus had fought on Zebes, she arrives at the control room and recovers Adam's platoon helmet. The Bottle Ship's self-destruct protocol is remotely activated, which an armorless Samus escapes with Adam's helmet.

== Development ==
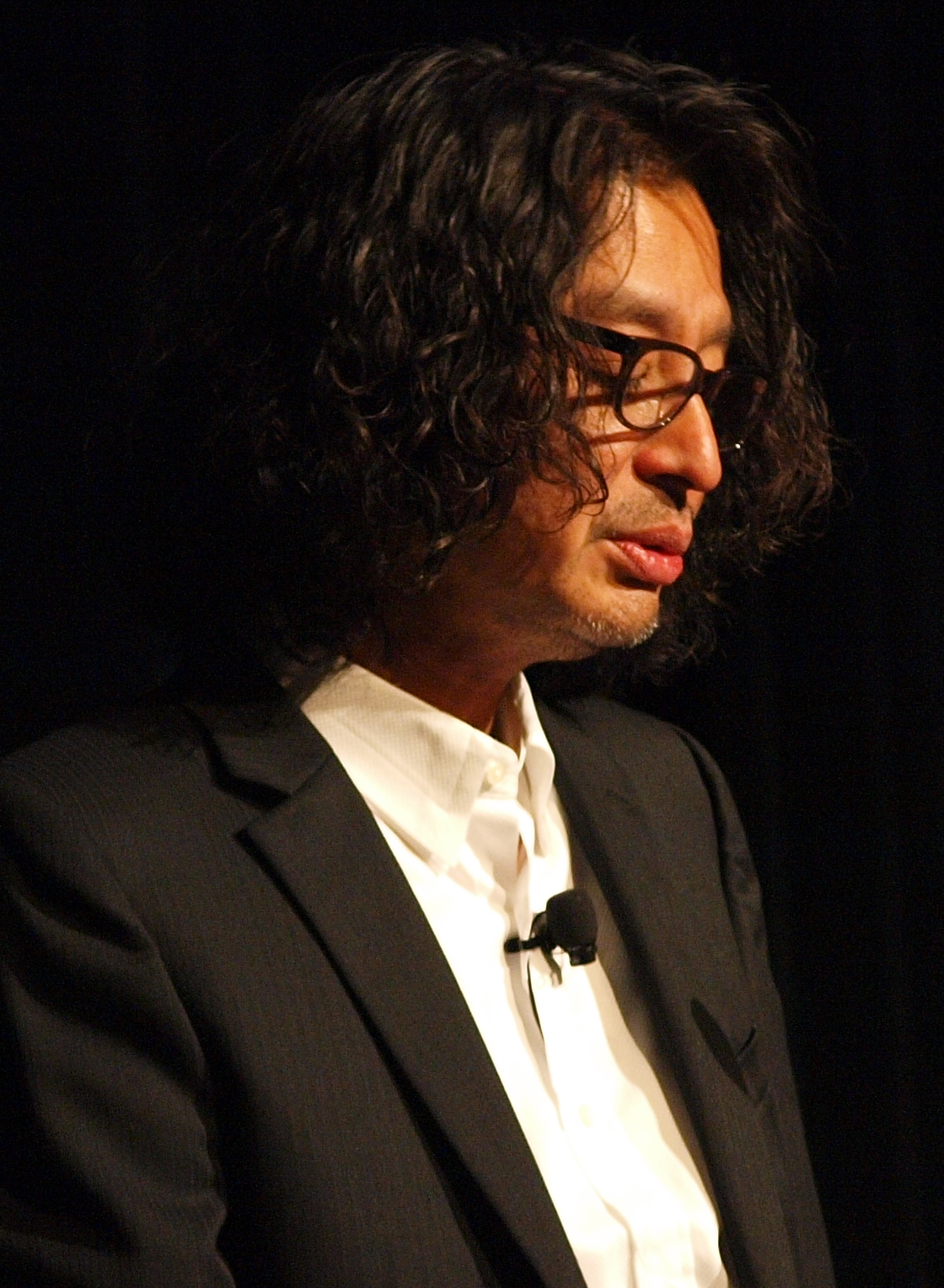
Metroid series designer Yoshio Sakamoto, pictured at the 2010 Game Developers Conference

Metroid: Other M was developed by "Project M", a team of over 100 people that includes staff from Nintendo, Tecmo's Team Ninja, and D-Rockets, with production lasting for three years. When the Wii console was released, Nintendo producer and chief Metroid designer Yoshio Sakamoto decided to create a new Metroid game for it, but opted to work with an outside company, as his usual development team did not have experience in producing a 3D game. Sakamoto eventually approached Yosuke Hayashi of Team Ninja to discuss the incorporation of the flashy engine used for Ninja Gaiden (2004) into a new engine to encompass his new vision of a 3D Metroid game. Sakamoto served as producer and scenario designer, and main design was done by three designers from previous 2D Metroid games—Metroid Fusion (2002) and Metroid: Zero Mission (2004). Team Ninja took charge of the programming and 3D modeling, and D-Rockets handled the CG cutscenes. Hayashi described the work as "a great honour" since he was a fan of the series, and stated Team Ninja tried to include as many creatures seen in previous games as possible. Development was unaffected when Tecmo merged with Koei to form Tecmo Koei months before the release of the game.

While Retro Studios tried to create "the ultimate first-person experience" with the Metroid Prime series, resulting in an experience resembling first-person shooters, Sakamoto's approach with gameplay was different, particularly for the story Other M intended to tell. Sakamoto's intent was to create a game with "controls as simple as those of a NES game", so it would appeal to modern players. Team Ninja agreed with that approach, as they felt control schemes with excessive buttons were possibly turning players off the action genre, and tried to use only the Wii Remote, without the Nunchuk. The development team also tried to use the simpler controls to provide flashy action, with varied special attacks that would need few button inputs to be executed. Sakamoto focused on 2D-like gameplay because he considered it more "comfortable" for audiences, particularly during shifts from gameplay to cutscenes, as he thought 2D "[doesn't] have the same distractions when you want to give them story sequences". While the developers felt no need to integrate everything from the Prime series as they were games with different concepts, a few of the elements that "made those games unique" were implemented into Other M, such as the "immersive sight" of the first-person mode. When questioned if Other M would be too similar to Ninja Gaiden, Hayashi responded that while the new game will feature heavy action-based sequences, there will still be the exploration-based sequences characteristic of other Metroid games. Sakamoto said that Other M's story progression was in the same manner as Metroid Fusion, and that the collaboration between Nintendo and Team Ninja is "unlike anything that's ever been done at Nintendo; it's more than just a collaborative effort — it's one group working toward a common goal".

Before Other M's development, Sakamoto did not think too much about "what kind of person Samus Aran was and how she thinks and her personality", particularly because the games depicted Samus as a mysterious person. Sakamoto and Team Ninja focused on backstory to present Samus as an "appealing human character", something important for future installments, as players would get further interest in Samus' adventures. Hayashi said that one of the development team's goals was to have the player "connect with Samus as the story and action develops". Sakamoto also said the game would "bring everyone up to the same level of understanding in the Metroid universe", and would not only introduce the series to new players but also create new challenges for fans. The chronological setting between Super Metroid and Metroid Fusion was chosen because Sakamoto considered the period important, and without addressing it, they wouldn't be able to make new games that show Samus' adventures that take place after the events of Metroid Fusion.

D-Rockets, a company specialized in CG animation for video games and commercials, was brought into the project for its in-game cinematics on Team Ninja productions. Director Ryuji Kitaura said when Nintendo gave him the instructions, he considered the work "overwhelming" - most of D-Rockets work only involved high-quality CG, while Nintendo aimed to "make the parts of the game that the player controls the same quality as the cinematics, in order to make them seamless" and Sakamoto intended to cutscenes to give emotional depth to Samus. Team Ninja and D-Rockets worked separately most of the time, and only started to collaborate about a year into production, to make sure the in-game action and the cutscenes had the same style. Over 300 storyboards which took six months to be completed, and ten teams were employed on the development of cutscenes. For increased realism, professional camera operators helped with the motion capture, and Samus' face had a more detailed frame to make expressions more lifelike. Kitaura tried to include more scenes with Samus outside her powered armor, to illustrate "the human, weak side of Samus, her expressions and gesture", but Sakamoto convinced him otherwise with a declaration that the Power Suit acts as a shield for both enemy attacks and the reveal of her emotions. Other M uses a dual-layer disc due to extensive cinematics.

=== Audio ===
Kuniaki Haishima composed the soundtrack of Other M. The team hired Haishima to write the music because the producers felt he could "tell the story with melodies" and "powerfully [helped] us depict Samus' feelings and emotions". Parts of the soundtrack were recorded and performed by Arigat-Orchestra in Tokyo and Asian Philharmonic Orchestra in Beijing. A sheet of piano music was also made within a day at Sakamoto's request; according to audio director Ryo Koike, Sakamoto expressed his desire to create a piano melody. Koike brought in a piano-playing staff member to play the music. When Koike presented it to Sakamoto, he stated that parts of the music were "wrong". Sakamoto's criticism continued until the music became a simpler melody that brought him to tears.

Jessica Martin was cast to play Samus in the English version. The recording sessions took over a year, with the cast recording using storyboards and unfinished cutscenes. Adam Malkovich was voiced by Dave Elvin, while Mike McGillicuty provided the voice of Anthony Higgs. In Japanese, the voice actors Ai Kobayashi, Rikiya Koyama, Kenji Nomura and Shizuka Itō provided the voices of Samus, Adam, Anthony and MB. The English acting was recorded by the Bad Animals Studio in Seattle, and the Japanese acting by Onkio Haus in Tokyo.

== Marketing and release ==
Metroid: Other M was first announced by Nintendo of America president and CEO Reggie Fils-Aimé and a trailer was briefly shown at E3 2009. Fils-Aimé said that Metroid: Other M would take players deeper into Samus' story, and would be a return to the style of the traditional series as opposed to the Metroid Prime series, with a "harder edge". Nintendo showcased a playable demo at E3 2010, which GameTrailers picked as Best Wii Game and Action/Adventure Game of the expo, and was nominated for Game of the Show. Previews of Other M were also featured in the 2010 editions of Game Developers Conference and Nintendo Media Summit. Fils-Aimé expected global sales of between 1.5 and 2 million units.

Other M was released in North America on August 31, 2010. It had an original release date of June 27, but was postponed by two months, as the high standards of the development team got them behind the completion schedule. In other territories, Other M was released on September 2 in Japan and Australia, and one day later in Europe, where its release was preceded by a large marketing campaign with television spots, trailers at theaters, and online ads. GameStop began providing an art folio for purchasers who pre-ordered the game, containing 16 cards; the cards feature concept artwork, in-game screenshots, and a description from Samus' perspective. Two strategy guide books were published in Japan: Metroid: Other M: Complete Capture Guide (Note: METROID Other M 完全攻略ガイド, Metoroido Azā Emu Kanzen Kōryaku Gaido) by Koei Tecmo on September 15, 2010, and Nintendo Official Guidebook: Metroid: Other M (Note: 任天堂公式ガイドブック メトロイド アザーエム, Nintendō Kōshiki Gaidobukku Metoroido Azā Emu) by Shogakukan on September 17. Other M was rereleased on the Wii U's Nintendo eShop in Japan on March 17, 2016, in Europe on March 31, and in North America on December 8.

=== Technical problems ===
Other M was reported to have a bug where the door in Sector 3 is permanently locked and impassable, preventing players from continuing. Nintendo revealed that a bug is triggered when the player backtracks to the room within Sector 3 where they have previously obtained the Ice Beam. The company set up a program that allowed players affected by the bug to send in an SD card or their Wii console with their save files to be repaired. As Other M uses a dual-layer disc, Nintendo said that some Wii consoles may have difficulty reading data off a large-capacity medium due to a contaminated laser lens of an optical disc drive.

== Reception ==
Reception

Aggregate score
Aggregator	Score
Metacritic	79/100

Review scores
Publication	Score
1Up.com	B−
Destructoid	6.5/10
Edge	8/10
Eurogamer	8/10
Famitsu	8/10, 9/10, 9/10, 9/10
G4	2/5
Game Informer	^{US} 6.25/10^{AUS} 8/10
GamePro	4/5
GameSpot	8.5/10
GameSpy	3/5
GamesRadar+	3.5/5
GameTrailers	8.6/10
IGN	8.5/10
Nintendo World Report	7/10
Official Nintendo Magazine	91%

Metroid: Other M received "generally favorable reviews", according to review aggregator website Metacritic. However, retrospective critical opinion has been more negative. In 2025 Escapist Magazine called it "misguided", and Polygon referred to it as the "black sheep of the series".

=== Gameplay ===
GameSpot's Tom McShea praised the control scheme and combat system as "unique and responsive", and wrote that the search for secrets was "very rewarding". Craig Harris of IGN called the gameplay "a really impressive evolution of the old-school Metroid design", and GameTrailers described it as "a nice compromise between satisfying fans and opening up the series for a wider audience". In a review for an Australian television series Good Game, Stephanie Bendixsen enjoyed the atmosphere, while Steven O'Donnell remarked on how the developers "kept the control scheme so simple, and yet it works so well". The writers from Famitsu also praised the Sense Move technique and the switch between perspectives.

Complaints were raised on the first-person perspective, with Ryan Scott of GameSpy considered it a "weird forced handicap". Phil Kollar of Game Informer expressed disappointment that the game prevents the player from moving while in first person view. The A.V. Club's David Wolinsky found the pixel hunting sequences irritating, while Official Nintendo Magazine's Chris Scullion similarly described them as the "only truly horrible moments". Critics responded poorly to the mechanic of power-up restriction; they derided it as a deviation from the series' tradition of item discovery, and even more strongly criticized it as nonsensical and condescending in terms of story. GamesRadar derided the linearity in comparison with Metroid Fusion, a game which took a similar approach. The website also found the enemies to be "a largely unimpressive collection", a gripe which Edge also had; it wrote that "truly testing enemies are only found in the last stretch". Other M's short length was criticized by reviewers, by critics such as GameTrailers, which writes that the bonuses such as art galleries were not stimulating enough to entice replay value.

=== Graphics ===
The graphics were also well received. Christian Donlan of Eurogamer exclaimed that Other M bears graphical similarities to Metroid Prime which "tend to come across as nicely-built video game levels at best". Harris wrote that while the graphics were not on par with the Prime series, he still felt it was one of the best-looking games on the Wii. Tom Hoggins of The Daily Telegraph described the environments as "lush and detailed", and said they helped "capturing the ethos of old-school Metroid". Harris also praised the "storytelling with motion-captured acting and voice-over", and Wired's Chris Kohler applauded the "slick graphic effects" in cutscenes. The music was praised as atmospheric and faithful to the franchise, though McShea felt they were "more like outtakes from older entries than a moody new soundtrack".

=== Writing ===
Heavy criticism was directed toward the script, dialogue, and cutscene length. McShea felt that the unskippable cutscenes and "the overabundance of story in Other M were a negative deviation from Metroid tradition". Kollar states that they "often run as long as 15 minutes, exhausting players with repetition of obvious plot points and overwrought dialogue as mature and interesting as a teenager's diary". Justin Haywald of 1UP.com complained that as the game progresses "instead of getting more of the things that work [combat], you get more of the things you don't care about [overwrought story]". Donlan notes that the plot is considered as "the future's dumbest soap opera". Wolinsky echoes the misgivings about Samus' immaturity, petulant behavior, and misguided loyalty. Tae K. Kim of GamePro writes that while the story and Samus' monologues did not compel them, "it helped contextualize her entire existence" which developed the character to "an actual human being who's using the vastness of space to try and put some distance between herself and the past". Contrarily, Haywald found the portrayal "lifeless", "boring" and "nonsensical". G4TV's Abbie Heppe criticized Other M for portraying Samus as a "little girl that cannot possibly wield the amount of power she possesses unless directed to by a man", and found that her anxiety attack upon confronting Ridley could not be reconciled with her previous portrayals. Joystiq was overwhelmingly negative in their discussion of the game's writing. The site's editor-in-chief Chris Grant stated that the cutscenes made him "want to vomit".

In a feature for 1UP.com, Jeremy Parish states that many Metroid fans were disappointed by the story, power-up restrictions and its "awkward handling of its leading lady". Video game scholar Luke Arnott argued that players were dissatisfied with Other M because it did not consistently balance gameplay constraints with player agency, and because it failed at what he calls "imperative" storytelling. Arnott suggested that studying how games like Other M create meaning in virtual spaces may help design better games and situate them within wider theories of postmodern subjectivity. Clyde Mandelin of Legends of Localization noted that the game received mixed reactions from Japanese fans. Kotaku's Luke Plunkett wrote that Team Ninja was blamed by "many people" for the story; Hayashi later clarified that Sakamoto wrote the story himself. Nintendo Treehouse producer Nate Bihldorff stated that the scene depicting Samus' encounter with Ridley "is not a sign of weakness, but of strength. People who call out that scene as anything but empowering are kind of missing the point". He added that Samus' story "has largely been a matter of individual perception, especially in the US, where people haven't read any of the official manga related to her childhood".

=== Sales ===
Metroid: Other M was the third-best-selling video game in Japan during its week of release with 45,398 copies sold, ranking it behind Wii Party and Monster Hunter Diary: Poka Poka Airu Village. An additional 11,239 copies were sold the following week. It was also the ninth-best-selling game in North America during September 2010, with 173,000 copies sold. In the United Kingdom, it failed to make the top 10 and placed 12th in its first week. In November, Fils-Aimé said that it had sold almost half a million copies sold in the United States.

=== Awards ===
Other M received honors and distinctions from various gaming sites and publications. In IGN's Best of 2010 Awards, it received the award for Coolest Atmosphere. It was also nominated for Best Story award, but lost to Epic Mickey. Wired listed it 12th on its list of the twenty best games of the year. Conversely, Entertainment Weekly chose it as the second-worst of 2010. GamesRadar chose Other M as the "mangled makeover" of 2010, writing that it painted Samus as "an unsure, insecure woman who desperately wants the approval of her former (male) commanding officer". Game Informer listed Samus first on their list of the Top 10 Dorks of 2010 due to her "lame backstory", and placed Other M third on their Top 10 Disappointments of 2010 list, ranking behind "studio closures, layoffs, [and] restructurings" and the "Infinity Ward debacle".

== Legacy ==
The Geothermal Power Plant is featured as a playable stage in Dead or Alive: Dimensions, a fighting game developed for the Nintendo 3DS by Team Ninja. The stage features Ridley as a stage hazard, while Samus appears as an assist character in the Morph Ball form, who will drop a Power Bomb that switches the combatants' location when a sound is made in the microphone. Samus is not featured as a playable character in Dead or Alive: Dimensions, as Yosuke Hayashi explained that "it would be better to let her focus on her job rather than kicking everyone's butt in Dead or Alive: Dimensions". The Pyrosphere also appears as a stage in Super Smash Bros. for Wii U.

Ahead of the release of Metroid Dread in 2021, Nintendo released a large amount of marketing material which leaned into nostalgia value and the franchise's long history, including releasing classic artwork from older titles in high resolution. Den of Geek noted that Nintendo was however omitting Other M from this process. They added that "Nintendo hasn't officially removed it from the canon, but they're also clearly not drawing from it". The only mention of the game was a section on the Dread promotional website discussing the franchise's history.

In May 2022, former president of Nintendo of America Reggie Fils-Aimé expressed his disappointment with Other M, believing it would be a hit: "I really thought that that was going to be a defining moment for the Metroid franchise. It was giving much more of a perspective about Samus. I really thought that was going to be a killer moment in the franchise's history, and it wasn't. It didn't deliver – not the business results, it really didn't touch the player the way we hoped it would".
