= Blades of Fire =

- Developer: MercurySteam
- Publisher: 505 Games
- Director: Enric Álvarez Benito
- Producer: Elena Guzmán Sánchez
- Designer: Luis Miguel Quijada Henares
- Programmer: José Darío Halle Cano
- Artist: Arturo Serrano Do Nascimento
- Writer: Enric Álvarez Benito
- Composer: Óscar Araujo
- Engine: Mercury Engine
- Platforms: PlayStation 5; Windows; Xbox Series X/S
- Release: 22 May 2025
- Genre: Action-adventure
- Mode: Single-player

Blades of Fire is a 2025 action-adventure game developed by MercurySteam and published by 505 Games. The game was released for PlayStation 5, Windows, and Xbox Series X/S on 22 May 2025. It received mixed reviews from critics and failed to meet the sales expectations of 505 Games' parent company Digital Bros.

== Gameplay ==
Blades of Fire is a third-person action-adventure video game. Players assume control of a warrior named Aran de Lira, who wields an ancient hammer allowing him to forge various weapons. The game is set in an interconnected world with various alternate paths and hidden locations. When fighting enemies, players can choose how to place and position their weapons from two directions (the right and the left). They can also target an enemy's head or torso, and use slashing, stabbing, and blunt techniques to deal damage. Blocking incoming attacks regenerates stamina, while parrying can break an enemy's defense, providing a window for players to deal large amount of damage. Each weapon will eventually degrade, and they can be repaired at anvil checkpoints, or be broken down into crafting materials. Throughout the game, Aran will be accompanied by Adso, a young scholar who will provide players with useful combat tips and assist in solving puzzles.

As players progress, they will collect "Forge Scrolls", which are essential for crafting weapons. In the Forge, players can modify their weapons extensively and alter their physical properties such as weapon length, shape of the blade, and the materials used for crafting. This, in turn, will alter their performance such as durability, penetration and edge quality. Players also have to physically control how Aran hammer the weapon into shape through a minigame. Different enemies have different weaknesses. If an enemy is highlighted in green, it means that the weapon Aran is carrying can deal maximum damage towards them. If an enemy is highlighted in red, the weapon will deal no damage, and players have to switch to another weapon. If Aran is defeated in battle, players will respawn at the nearest anvil checkpoint. All enemies in the area will also respawn. The weapon Aran is last using, however, will be dropped at the location of his most-recent death.

== Premise ==
An ancient race named the Forgers created mankind and provided them with the knowledge of using steel to create weapons. Queen Nerea, after rising to power, casts a curse turning her enemies' steel into stone, rendering their weapons useless against her forces. The game follows a warrior named Aran de Lira, who is gifted with a sacred hammer enabling him to craft his own steel weapons, as he attempts to find his way to the Royal Palace to assassinate the Queen. He is followed by Adso de Zelk, a young scholar who documents his journey.

== Development ==
Blades of Fire was developed by MercurySteam, the studio behind Castlevania: Lords of Shadow and Metroid Dread. Some of the founding members also worked on Severance: Blade of Darkness. Enric Alvarez, the game's director, described the game as an opportunity for the team revisit the dark fantasy genre. The team adopted an expressive art direction for the game, as opposed to using realistic visuals commonly seen in modern fantasy games. Comics created by Frank Frazetta and Gustave Doré inspired the game's visuals, with the team using "vivid colors" and "dramatic compositions" while creating the game's overall aesthetics. Alvarez described the story of Blades of Fire as a "dark fairytale", one that was inspired by fantasy movies such as Excalibur and Ladyhawke. A major theme of the story was "reunion", and the team was influenced by Count of Monte Cristo, a revenge story, when creating the backstory for Aran. Adso was created in an attempt to further humanize the game's cast of characters, and his youthful energy was used to contrast with Aran's "blunt" personality.

Joan Amat, the game's lead weapon designer, added that the team watched YouTubers who produced videos on historical weapons to better understand how they function in real life. Initially, the game required players to consider the technical properties of materials, such as their hardness, flexibility, and tenacity, and the interactions of blade types and armor during combat. However, the team subsequently decided to significantly streamline these systems as they felt that they became unnecessarily complex for players to understand. The team wanted players to feel attached to their weapons. As a result, each individual weapon can be named, and using a weapon increased its reputation. While players cannot upgrade their weapons in the game, a weapon with a high reputation can be traded for better resources. Amat added that the combat system was designed to be slow and deliberate, and he compared enemy encounter to a "duel in a Kurosawa movie".

== Release ==
In December 2021, 505 Games and its parent company, Digital Bros, announced that they will be partnering with MercurySteam on a project codenamed Project Iron. Blades of Fire was officially announced in February 2025. The game was released for PlayStation 5, Windows, and Xbox Series X/S on 22 May 2025.

== Reception ==
Reception

Aggregate scores
Aggregator	Score
Metacritic	(PC) 72/100 (PS5) 71/100 (XSXS) 73/100
OpenCritic	50% recommend

Review scores
Publication	Score
Eurogamer	4/5
Game Informer	5.5/10
GamesRadar+	4/5
IGN	5/10
PC Gamer (US)	74/100
PCGamesN	6/10
Push Square	7/10
RPGamer	3.5/5
Shacknews	6/10

=== Critical reception ===
Blades of Fire received "mixed or average" reviews from critics, according to review aggregator website Metacritic. Fellow review aggregator OpenCritic assessed that the game received fair approval, being recommended by 50% of critics.

Tom Orry of Eurogamer says that "Blades of Fire manages to feel original, lovable, and born of genuine passion, despite the near overwhelming number of problems that could have extinguished it." Game Informer's Kyle Hilliard concluded that "Blades of Fire feels a bit like the developer's attempt at bringing something new to what has now become the overpopulated Souls-inspired genre. It was unsuccessful in this instance, but some of its ideas around combat and the world it created are exciting. They just couldn't overcome the parts that made me want to give up on the game." Abbie Stone from GamesRadar said that "Blades of Fire dares to make the case for weapon degradation being a good thing and succeeds. The fun characters, secret-stuffed level design, and terrific combat don't hurt either. A really pleasant surprise." Writer for IGN, Jada Griffin says that "The combat is serviceable but overly simplistic, and the mediocre story often failed to evoke any kind of emotion in me at all, positive or negative, as it just goes through the motions from start to finish. The unintuitive map also frequently left me running in circles, making what could have been a fun hunt for secrets feel more like a chore. And when those pain points are compounded by unflattering comparisons to the games it so clearly took inspiration from, Blades of Fire just can't cut it."

Kerry Brunskill's conclusion from PC Gamer was "Blades of Fire can be great fun, but it definitely overstays its welcome." "Its control scheme is strange and will force you to press each button with care. Its granular forging system makes you consider every weapon in your arsenal. But however differently it approaches them, the game only offers the same thrills as other action games of its ilk." was Grace Benfell's verdict on PCGamesN. Khayl Adam's review on Push Square concluded that "Taking inspiration from some of gaming's greatest hits, it never quite manages to reach those lofty heights itself, let down by a generic setting and lacklustre art direction. Still, it offers some interesting concepts, with combat and crafting mechanics that remain satisfying throughout." Jordan McClain from RPGamer said that "Blades of Fire is a remarkable action RPG, and it executes its themes, combat, and presentation in a balanced, synergistic manner. While it hammers out its best aspects with force and confidence, it unfortunately suffers from pacing issues that hold back its endearing, attractive plot. Despite its stunning presentation and sophisticated location design, the adventure's scale feels a bit too long for its own good sometimes." Lucas White for Shacknews said that "It's a kind of game that feels out of place in time, but benefits from its accidental time travel by doing things a PlayStation 2-era console simply can't."

=== Sales ===
In July 2025, Digital Bros (the parent company of 505 Games) said that Blades of Fire had failed to meet their sales expectations, because of "an oversupply of new releases and increasingly selective consumers".
