= Metroid Ravenous =

Upcoming video game

- Developers: MercurySteam; Nintendo EPD
- Publisher: Nintendo
- Series: Metroid
- Platform: Nintendo Switch 2
- Release: January 28, 2027
- Genre: Action-adventure
- Mode: Single-player

Metroid Ravenous is an upcoming action-adventure game developed by MercurySteam and Nintendo EPD and published by Nintendo for the Nintendo Switch 2. It is the eleventh main Metroid game and the sequel to Metroid Dread (2021). Ravenous is scheduled for release on January 28, 2027.

== Gameplay and premise ==
Like its predecessor, Metroid Dread (2021), Metroid Ravenous features side-scrolling gameplay. As the bounty hunter Samus Aran, players explore an alien moon, while Samus finds herself facing five mysterious Space Ninjas who have targeted her. Samus's new abilities include warping through walls, running on water, and siphoning energy from enemies. The parry system from Metroid Dread returns.

== Development ==
Like Metroid Dread and Samus Returns, Metroid Ravenous is developed by MercurySteam and Nintendo EPD. Nintendo announced it in a Nintendo Direct presentation on September 9, 2026. In Kotaku, Ash Parrish praised the more aggressive characterization of Samus in the trailer. It supports HDR and 120 Hz displays. It is scheduled for release on January 28, 2027.
