= MercurySteam =

Spanish video game developer

Mercury Steam Entertainment S.L.
- Trade name: MercurySteam
- Type: Sociedad Limitada
- Industry: Video games
- Predecessor: Rebel Act Studios
- Founded: May 2002; 24 years ago
- Founders: Enric Álvarez; José Ignacio Navas
- Headquarters: San Sebastián de los Reyes, Madrid, Spain
- Key people: Enric Álvarez; Dave Cox
- Owner: Nordisk Film (40%)
- Number of employees: 246 (Nov. 2024)
- Website: mercurysteam.com

Mercury Steam Entertainment S.L., doing business as MercurySteam, is a Spanish video game developer based in San Sebastián de los Reyes, Madrid. Their games include Castlevania: Lords of Shadow (2010), Metroid: Samus Returns (2017), Metroid Dread (2021) and Metroid Ravenous (2027).

== History ==
MercurySteam was formed in May 2002 by former members of Rebel Act Studios who had developed Severance: Blade of Darkness. Co-founder Enric Alvarez was CEO and games director. The company's first game was American McGee Presents: Scrapland for Xbox and PlayStation 2.

When Konami decided to reboot the Castlevania series, MercurySteam successfully pitched a 3D action game that would become Lords of Shadow. The developers received assistance from Hideo Kojima. After the game was released in 2010, additional downloadable content was released the following year. Toward the end of initial development, the company took on the work of developing a sequel for the Nintendo 3DS. MercurySteam chose to develop for the 3DS over the PlayStation Vita for its stereoscopic technology. The company redeveloped its internal engine for the project. Initially expected in 2012, it was delayed to the beginning of 2013. Lords of Shadow – Mirror of Fate allowed the 60-person company to stay in business between bigger projects.

Lords of Shadow sold better than expected and proved to be the best selling Castlevania game of all time. As a result, Konami requested a home console sequel, forcing MercurySteam to develop two games at once. Lords of Shadow – Mirror of Fate was released in early 2013. Lords of Shadow 2 was developed as an open world game set in a modern city, and would be the company's last in the series. It suffered from reported development problems before releasing in 2014. Art director José Luis Vaello left for Tequila Works during development. The studio's leadership denied any wrongdoing.

In 2016, the company self-published Raiders of the Broken Planet, a four-versus-one online shooter. Having left Konami after the release of Lords of Shadow 2, producer for the trilogy, Dave Cox, joined MercurySteam. The studio increased to 140 employees during development. It was initially conceived to be episodic, with a free tutorial and mission included. Paid campaign expansions were then offered. The game performed well on PlayStation 4 and Xbox One but struggled on PC. A progression system was added with the game's third campaign, which helped improve attach rate. By August 2018, the game was relaunched as a free-to-play title called Spacelords. By this point, the game was maintained by a team of 100.

As early as 2015, it was reported that MercurySteam was working on a prototype for a Metroid game. It had pitched a remake of the 2002 game Metroid Fusion to Nintendo, but producer Yoshio Sakamoto had hired them to create a remake of Metroid II instead. Nintendo announced Metroid: Samus Returns at E3 2017, a remake of the 1991 Metroid II: Return of Samus on the Game Boy. It was developed in partnership with Nintendo and released for the Nintendo 3DS in September 2017.

MercurySteam collaborated with Sakamoto again to develop Metroid Dread for the Nintendo Switch. Known as Project Cazadora during development, reports after launch described a chaotic work environment, including mismanagement during the COVID-19 pandemic and other toxic behavior. Nintendo performed an internal review of the project and found the company had massively overscoped for art and cinematics, leading to significant cuts in content. In December 2020, Nordisk Film, under its Nordisk Games division, purchased a 40% stake in the studio.

Metroid Dread was released in 2021 and debuted as the third best-selling game in the US and the highest-ranked selling game on the platform. MercurySteam were criticized for excluding staff members from the credits of Metroid Dread. A representative defended the decision to GameSpot, stating: "We accredit all those who certify a minimum participation in a particular project – usually the vast majority of devs. We set the minimum at 25% of development time." The studio suggested years later that it had adjusted this policy to be more in line with International Game Developers Association recommendations. In a 2023 interview, studio head Enric Álvarez denied all wrongdoing.

In December 2021, MercurySteam released a remaster of Scrapland, its first game. 505 Games also announced it had partnered with MercurySteam to develop a third-person action RPG under the codename Project Iron. Blades of Fire was announced for PlayStation 5, Xbox Series X and S, and PC (as an Epic Games Store exclusive) in February 2025. The game was released in May, but was reported to have underperformed by July.

In September 2025, the Spanish trade union CSVI-CGT accused the MercurySteam of instituting mandatory overtime, including 10-hour days, a crackdown of internal communications, the limitation of vacation days for several months of the year and the elimination of remote work. Another group of employees denied these accusations. 3DJuegos reported a toxic work environment during the development of Blades of Fire, especially in early to mid-2025. These include forced 10-hour workdays and intimidation strategies.

In February 2026, it was announced that Blades of Fire would be released on Steam in May with additional features. In September, Nintendo announced Metroid Ravenous, scheduled for release on January 28, 2027, for the Nintendo Switch 2.

== Games developed ==
Title	Year	Platform(s)	Publisher(s)	Notes	Ref.
American McGee Presents: Scrapland	2004	Windows; Xbox	Enlight Software; Deep Silver	—N/a	
Zombies	2006	Nokia 6680; Nokia N70	MercurySteam	—N/a	
Clive Barker's Jericho	2007	Windows; PlayStation 3; Xbox 360	Codemasters	Co-developed with Alchemic Productions	
Castlevania: Lords of Shadow	2010	Windows; PlayStation 3; Xbox 360	Konami	—N/a	
Castlevania: Lords of Shadow – Mirror of Fate	2013	Nintendo 3DS; Windows; PlayStation 3; Xbox 360	Konami	—N/a	
Castlevania: Lords of Shadow 2	2014	Windows; PlayStation 3; Xbox 360	Konami	—N/a	
Metroid: Samus Returns	2017	Nintendo 3DS	Nintendo	Co-developed with Nintendo EPD	
Spacelords	2017	Windows; PlayStation 4; Xbox One; PlayStation 5; Xbox Series X/S	MercurySteam	—N/a	
Metroid Dread	2021	Nintendo Switch	Nintendo	Co-developed with Nintendo EPD	
American McGee Presents: Scrapland Remastered	2021	Windows	MercurySteam	—N/a	
Blades of Fire	2025	Windows; PlayStation 5; Xbox Series X/S	505 Games	—N/a	
Metroid Ravenous	2027	Nintendo Switch 2	Nintendo	Co-developed with Nintendo EPD	
