= AM2R =

Fan-made video game

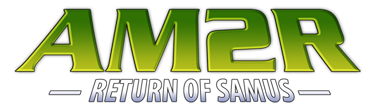
- Developer: Milton Guasti
- Producer: Robert Sephazon
- Series: Metroid (unofficial)
- Engine: GameMaker Studio
- Platforms: Windows, Linux, Android
- Release: August 6, 2016
- Genre: Action-adventure
- Mode: Single-player

AM2R (Another Metroid 2 Remake) is an action-adventure game developed by the Argentine programmer Milton Guasti (also known as DoctorM64) and released for Windows on August 6, 2016, Metroid's 30th anniversary.

AM2R is an unofficial remake of the 1991 Game Boy game Metroid II: Return of Samus by Nintendo, largely based on the visual style of Metroid: Zero Mission (2004). As in the original Metroid II, players control the bounty hunter Samus Aran, who aims to eradicate the parasitic Metroids. AM2R adds features including new graphics and music, new areas and bosses, altered controls, and a map system.

AM2R received positive reviews, particularly for its graphics. It was nominated for the Game Awards 2016, but was dropped from the nominee list without notice. Shortly after release, Nintendo sent DMCA notices to websites hosting AM2R, and download links were removed. Though Guasti planned to continue working on the game privately, in September 2016, he ended development after receiving a DMCA take-down request. Nintendo released an official Metroid II remake, Metroid: Samus Returns, in 2017.

== Gameplay ==
The same area in Metroid II (left) and AM2R (right). In the AM2R screenshot, the player attacks an airborne enemy diagonally – an ability not present in the original.

AM2R is an enhanced remake of the Game Boy game Metroid II: Return of Samus, which follows Samus Aran on her quest to eradicate the parasitic Metroid species from SR388, their home world. The remake builds upon the visual style of Metroid: Zero Mission, adding a map system, new areas, mini-bosses, upgrades originally introduced in Super Metroid, redone graphics and music, an updated artificial intelligence for enemies, and a log system similar to Metroid Prime. Logs give the player more information on Metroids, enemies and the game world after the player has encountered certain enemies or arrived in new areas. The controls are less "floaty" than those of the original and feature new abilities such as wall jumping and grabbing onto ledges, more in line with the gameplay the series has employed since Super Metroid.

The Metroids the player fights have four main evolutionary stages – Alpha, Gamma, Zeta, and Omega – which have been altered compared to their Metroid II counterparts, including new techniques used in battle; Alpha is the least altered, having only been given a new dodge move, while Omega has been altered the most, having been changed to earth-bound enemies that trap the player. The player confronts these Metroid bosses often and has to defeat 55 of them. Among the newly added bosses are non-Metroid enemies such as a moving statue or a Torizo statue.

== Development ==
AM2R was developed by Milton Guasti under the pseudonym DoctorM64 over about ten years, with several breaks. Guasti wanted to recreate the fast gameplay of Metroid: Zero Mission and the "atmosphere and solitude" of Super Metroid. After finishing Metroid II for the first time, he imagined the game with modern gameplay, an in-game mini-map rather than a physical map, and the Omega Metroids as tall as the screen. As Guasti was not a programmer at the time, he used a trial-and-error method to modify a platforming game engine by Martin Piecyk within the game creation system GameMaker, with learning being his main motivation.

At first the remake followed the original Metroid II's map layout and existing sprites from Metroid: Zero Mission and Super Metroid. As Guasti kept working on the game engine and developed his skills, he felt that AM2R felt more and more authentic. After he announced the game, several artists volunteered to create original art; the Metroid evolutions were redesigned, and new enemies and areas unrelated to other Metroid games were added. Guasti remade the music while waiting for customers in his recording studio. The log system was designed to deliver narrative in an unintrusive way.

Because so much was changed in AM2R compared to the original Metroid II – with color, a larger screen, "less claustrophobic" caves, and new gameplay controls – Guasti was faced with the challenge of recreating the original's feeling of danger within a more modern style. Metroid II featured "tight-quarters combat", while AM2R's greater amount of screen space and mobility meant that the Metroids' behavior had to be changed. They were made more agile and aggressive, with the intent that players would have to use all tools available to them to defeat them. The scale of the rooms throughout the game world also had to be changed, with some landmarks being redesigned to make better use of the larger screen; some, however, were kept similar in size to their Metroid II counterparts. While the game's first areas were made colorful and accurate to their counterparts in Metroid II, later areas were expanded and introduced new elements, featuring progressively darker caves, tighter passages, and Metroids found in more dangerous locations. This, along with increasingly darker and menacing music, was to recreate the feeling of Metroid II, which Guasti described as "being lost in a dark, mysterious cave without knowing what's ahead".

Guasti was joined by Esteban Criado (under the pseudonym of "DruidVorse") as the lead playtester and Robert Maloney (under the pseudonym of "Sephazon") as the producer. In the later parts of the development, the largest challenge was to coordinate work; when Guasti started working as a programmer, he learned about project management and applied it to AM2R, but still found it challenging to have deadlines and keep people motivated, as everyone was working unpaid in their spare time. In late 2014, the project was ported to the newer version of GameMaker Studio, which enabled improved loading times and performance, but required the complete rewriting of some features and changes to the designs of some levels. This also made bugs faster to fix and new builds easier to make, making development more expedient and productive. Later that year, the developers worked on improving the visuals, giving the fourth area a new graphics tile set with more personality.

== Release ==
Guasti released a demo in late 2011 and another in early 2013. The full game was released free following a countdown through its website on August 6, 2016, coinciding with the Metroid series' 30th anniversary. Updated versions with further improvements and features were planned, but shortly after the first release, Nintendo sent DMCA notices to websites hosting it. The download links on the website were removed on August 7, but Guasti planned to work on the game privately. He said he understood Nintendo's need to protect its intellectual properties and encouraged AM2R players to buy the official Nintendo eShop release of Metroid II.

On September 2, Guasti received a DMCA takedown request from Nintendo and announced that he had ended development. He released the soundtrack later that month, including several tracks intended for the unfinished version 1.2 update. Development was continued by people from the Metroid fan community, including bug fixes, new enemies and story elements, and additional game modes such as New Game+ and a "Randomizer", which shuffles the locations of power-ups.

Nintendo released an official remake of Metroid II, Metroid: Samus Returns, in 2017. A year after the release of AM2R, Guasti was hired by Moon Studios to design levels for Ori and the Will of the Wisps. He also announced a project made in Unity 3D. Other members of the AM2R team formed SquidShock Studios and began work on an original Metroidvania, Bō: Path of the Teal Lotus, using hand-drawn art and inspired by games like Hollow Knight and Okami.

== Reception ==
Mike Fahey, writing for Kotaku, called the game brilliant and compared the gameplay, graphics, and music favorably to their Metroid II counterparts. Siliconera's Ishaan found the game impressive and said that it stands out from other fan remakes. Sam Machkovech at Ars Technica said that the game would be a delight to people who liked Zero Mission, and that its quality and amount of polish put it on par with Nintendo's games. Zack Furniss of Destructoid liked the game to the point that he thought Nintendo should use some ideas from it in future Metroid titles. Jonathan Holmes, also at Destructoid, said that AM2R does a good job at filling the "void" left by Nintendo's lack of new 2D Metroid games, calling it "even more of an extensive re-imagining than Metroid: Zero Mission was to Metroid 1". Gonçalo Lopes at Nintendo Life said that the game was a great way to celebrate the series' 30th anniversary and a dream come true for Metroid fans, and that he imagined people would be willing to pay money for it if sold on Nintendo's eShop. Matthew Castle at Nintendo Gamer called it an example of how to do a remake right. Tom Sykes at PC Gamer praised AM2R as a "great game in its own right" regardless of whether one had played Metroid II prior or not. NF Magazine's Tony Ponce initially worried that the game would lose the "eerie charm" of Metroid II, but found it to be able to keep a high-tension feeling, as well as including new things for long-time fans of the original.

Furniss found that the gameplay changes compared to the original Metroid II, such as the ability to grab onto ledges, all felt natural, and called the user interface "sleek". He liked the log system, calling it one of the biggest additions, and enjoyed how the opening added more story content while not being "overdone", instead feeling like the opening to Super Metroid. Holmes commended the boss battles, calling them "arguably" the best across all 2D Metroid games. Ponce found the precise win conditions for Metroid battles annoying considering how often they are fought, but similarly thought that the new non-Metroid bosses were among the most exciting and challenging in all 2D games in the series. His favorite new gameplay elements were the "gimmicks" such as the player-operated tunneling drill machine and the walker robot minigame.

Machkovech said that the game looks "phenomenal" and that its "beautiful, easily discernible sprites" and 60-frames-per-second animations made it look modern despite the 320×240 resolution. He particularly enjoyed the game's color palette, saying that it made AM2R feel like a completely new game. Furniss called the game "gorgeous", praising the colors and the increased graphical detail. Alec Meer at Rock, Paper, Shotgun said that the game looked lovely, and that it was a large improvement over the Game Boy version's green screen. Jeffrey Matulef, writing for Eurogamer, found it impressive how closely the game resembled Super Metroid visually. Fahey noted the soundtrack in particular as being of high quality, and Lopes called the music "fantastic".

The game was nominated for the Game Awards 2016 in the "Best Fan Creation" category, but was removed from the nomination page without notice alongside the fan game Pokémon Uranium. The Game Awards host Geoff Keighley explained that AM2R and Pokémon Uranium were not legally cleared by Nintendo to be included in the event.

== See also ==
- Full Screen Mario
- Sonic P-06
