= Elemental Rage =

2011 iOS platforming video game

- Developer: Oniric Games
- Publisher: Oniric Games
- Composer: Christian Fernando Perucchi
- Platform: iOS
- Release: WW: April 14, 2011
- Genres: Platform-adventure, Metroidvania
- Mode: Single-player

Elemental Rage is a 2011 action-adventure platform game developed by Argentinian indie studio Oniric Games. It is similar to the Metroid and Castlevania series.

== Plot ==
A boy named Huma awakens inside a vast castle, and must find the missing elemental spirits inside its depths to restore the world's corrupted denizens back to their normal selves.

== Gameplay ==
The player controls Huna as he explores the side-scrolling castle labyrinth, using the virtual controls on the touchpad. At the beginning of the game, Huna can run, jump, and bash enemies with his staff, but as he discovers the elemental spirits hidden throughout the castle, he will gain more abilities, e.g., double-jumping. After acquiring such techniques, the player will have to backtrack to previous areas to access new routes leading deeper into the castle. Enemies will sometimes drop weapon upgrades, but these are temporary, and the weapon will downgrade back to normal when the player takes damage.

== Reception ==
Elemental Rage received mixed reviews according to Metacritic. TouchArcade gave it 4 stars out of 5, calling it "one of the best experiences you can have if you enjoy a good action-platforming game", though criticizing its short length and excessive hand-holding of the player. Slide to Play scored the game 7.5/10 and said it was a "well polished adventure game that has taken inspiration from the metroidvania genre", specifically praising the "impressive soundtrack, something we don't often see in iDevice games" written by Argentinian Composer Christian Fernando Perucchi, but expressed reservations about the game's technical performance and its frustrating combat system, writing, "[i]t takes too long to upgrade the weapon [after being downgraded], and it is far too easy to lose it again." Pocket Gamer awarded the game 7/10, remarking that "Combat, platforming, and exploration meld to form a diverse style of gameplay not unique to Elemental Rage, but undeniably enjoyable"; however, it criticized numerous aspects of the game, saying "the characters are annoying cliches", "[t]here are too many blind falls that lead to death", "what few [boss battles] there are unpolished", and "[f]ighting enemies is frequently awkward due to the prevalence of flying creatures and rigid controls." GamePro gave Elemental Rage a score of 2.5/5, and wrote, "aside from a boring narrative and some excessive backtracking, the cute art aesthetic and challenging platforming make this a satisfactory experience."
