= Everybody 1-2-Switch! =

2023 video game

- Game icon
- Developers: Nintendo EPD; NDcube
- Publisher: Nintendo
- Directors: Yusuke Akifusa; Susumu Kuribayashi
- Producers: Kouichi Kawamoto; Hiromasa Shikata
- Designers: Hideki Fujii; Tatsumitsu Watanabe; Satoru Imamura; Daisuke Izumi
- Programmers: Shun Hakamada; Kentaro Tanaka; Masayuki Shinohara; Haruhiko Tanuma; Ikki Niwa
- Artists: Ryo Tanaka; Keisuke Kasahara; Shunsaku Yamamoto; Masayuki Tsuboi; Nana Tanaka
- Composers: Rei Kondoh; Haruno Ito; Naruki Kadosaka; Sho Kobayashi
- Series: 1-2-Switch
- Platform: Nintendo Switch
- Release: June 30, 2023
- Genre: Party
- Mode: Multiplayer

Everybody 1-2-Switch! (Note: Japanese: エブリバディ 1-2-Switch!, Hepburn: Eburibadi 1-2-Switch!) is a 2023 party video game developed by Nintendo and Nintendo Cube and published by Nintendo for the Nintendo Switch. The sequel to 1-2-Switch (2017), it is a collection of team-based minigames. It was released to mixed reviews, who criticized the gameplay and lack of variety, though its budget price and concept received praise.

== Gameplay ==
Everybody 1-2-Switch! is a sequel to the 2017 video game 1-2-Switch. It features 17 team-based minigames, each with multiple variants. Minigames are hosted by a man with a cartoon horse head known as MC Horace. The game can be controlled using both smartphones and the Nintendo Switch's Joy-Con controllers. Certain minigames can only be played using smartphones, while others can only be played using Joy-Con. The game supports up to 8 players using Joy-Con controllers, and up to 100 players can play using smartphones. Everybody 1-2-Switch! features a "Quiz Party" mode, which allows players to create custom questions for a trivia game, and a "Bingo Party" mode.

== Development ==
In June 2022, a report by Fanbyte claimed that Nintendo EPD was developing a sequel to 1-2-Switch, tentatively titled Everybody's 1-2-Switch. The game was described as an online party game compatible with up to 100 players, inspired by the Jackbox Party Pack series. The change in scope from the first game was reportedly made so that the sequel did not harm the original game's sales. According to the report, the game did not resonate with playtesters in its target audience of families with children, who found its minigames tedious. NDcube co-developed the game with Nintendo EPD.

== Release ==
Everybody 1-2-Switch! was announced on June 1, 2023. The announcement came without a trailer or in-game screenshots, and Kotaku described it as having "zero fanfare". The first trailer was released on June 20, which featured 16 content creators from around the world in a private event in Tokyo, Japan. Everybody 1-2-Switch! was released on June 30, 2023, exclusively on the Nintendo Switch.

== Reception ==
Reception

Aggregate scores
Aggregator	Score
Metacritic	54/100 (Note: Score based on 28 reviews)
OpenCritic	26% recommend (Note: Score based on 27 reviews)

Review scores
Publication	Score
Digital Trends	2.5/5
Hardcore Gamer	2/5
IGN	4/10
Nintendo Life	6/10
Shacknews	4/10

Everybody 1-2-Switch! received "mixed or average" reviews, according to review aggregator website Metacritic. The game was recommended by 26% of critics according to OpenCritic. While it was praised for its lower price tag than its predecessor, the game received criticism for its reliance on multiplayer, with Nintendo Life's Jim Norman saying the game "requires at least four players to get the most out of it" and "with a group of 10 or more willing friends, a lot of these games would be more enjoyable".

Reviewers enjoyed the "mass multiplayer" for up to 100 players that Everybody 1-2-Switch! offered, with Giovanni Colantonio from Digital Trends saying it was an "ideal title for schools, youth groups, messy parties, and more."

Nintendo Life criticised how "a lot of the games cover old ground" but praised the addition of using a smartphone as a controller, saying "the new mobile phone connectivity provides some different ways to play". The minigames received criticism for their lack of originality. Travis Northup of IGN said the minigames were "as uninspired as they come." Nintendo Life was less critical, admitting the games were "nothing new" but praised when they embraced "a WarioWare-esque weirdness and encourages you to laugh at everyone playing the game instead of thinking about the competition."
