= 1-2-Switch =

2017 video game

- Home menu icon, illustrating the "Table Tennis" and "Quick Draw" minigames
- Developer: Nintendo EPD
- Publisher: Nintendo
- Producer: Kouichi Kawamoto
- Composer: Maasa Miyoshi
- Platform: Nintendo Switch
- Release: March 3, 2017
- Genre: Party
- Mode: Multiplayer

1-2-Switch is a 2017 party video game developed and published by Nintendo for the Nintendo Switch. It was released as a launch title for the system. The game uses the system's Joy-Con controllers, with players facing each other performing various minigames. By December 31, 2022, it sold over 3.74 million copies, ranking 40th in best-selling games on the platform.

A sequel, Everybody 1-2-Switch!, was released in 2023.

== Gameplay ==
1-2-Switch is a party video game in which players do not usually rely on what is happening on-screen, but rather make use of audio cues and the functionality of the Switch's Joy-Con controllers to play in several different games. It features 28 different minigames, most of which involve two players, who each use one of the Joy-Con controllers and are often encouraged to look at each other during gameplay. Aside from tutorial videos for each game, players mostly rely solely on audio cues and feedback from the Joy-Con's rumble feature to indicate how well they are performing.

== Development ==
After Nintendo announced the game at the Nintendo Switch event in January 2017, Nintendo showed off six of the minigames to the public. The game was also unveiled to show off Nintendo's innovative Joy-Con capabilities, through the HD Rumble and IR Motion Camera features.

As a way to promote the milking minigame and the Nintendo Switch, several representatives of Nintendo of America took part in a cow milking competition at a dairy farm in Woodstock, Vermont.

== Reception ==
Reception

Aggregate scores
Aggregator	Score
Metacritic	58/100
OpenCritic	10% recommend

Review scores
Publication	Score
Destructoid	4.5/10
Game Informer	4/10
GameSpot	6/10
IGN	6.8/10
Nintendo Life	6/10
Nintendo World Report	6.5/10

1-2-Switch received "mixed or average" reviews, according to review aggregator website Metacritic. Fellow review aggregator OpenCritic assessed that the game received weak approval, being recommended by only 10% of critics.

Upon the release of its initial trailer, several commentators compared the game to the WarioWare series. Ben Skipper of the International Business Times made note of the game's sexual innuendos.

Nintendo's decision to release the game separately from the system was criticized by several commentators, arguing that the game would be better off as a pack-in game, similarly to Wii Sports, although Nintendo stated that they opted to allow consumers to select a game to purchase rather than bundling one and increase the Switch's price so as to not disinterest consumers and compromise the console's sales. Cory Arnold of Destructoid criticized the lack of a true single-player mode, and said that the minigames were far worse than what was included in Wii Sports, arguing that they lacked any sort of progression.

=== Sales ===
By April 2017, Nintendo reported that 1-2-Switch had shipped nearly a million copies worldwide. By March 2018, that number had risen to over two million. By June 2019, total sales reached 3.01 million. The 2023 CESA Games White Papers revealed that 1-2-Switch had sold 3.74 million units, as of December 31, 2022.

=== Accolades ===
Year	Award	Category	Result	Refs.
2018	National Academy of Video Game Trade Reviewers Awards	Control Design, 2D or Limited 3D	Nominated	
2018	National Academy of Video Game Trade Reviewers Awards	Game, Music or Performance Based	Nominated	

== Sequel ==
In June 2022, Fanbyte reported that a sequel to 1-2-Switch was in development. Tentatively titled Everybody's 1-2 Switch, the sequel was described as inspired by The Jackbox Party Pack series, featuring a collection of minigames that can be played with either traditional control methods or a smartphone. The game was reportedly received extremely poorly by playtesting groups, and while it was internally delayed for additional development time, empty game cases were already produced. While some within the company suggested including it as part of the Nintendo Switch Online + Expansion Pack membership, Nintendo executives planned to release the title as a standalone US$60 release.

Everybody 1-2-Switch! was officially announced on June 1, 2023, and was released on June 30, 2023.
