= Metroid: Samus Returns =

2017 video game

- Promotional artwork featuring Samus Aran
- Developers: MercurySteam; Nintendo EPD
- Publisher: Nintendo
- Directors: Takehiko Hosokawa; Jose Luis Márquez
- Producer: Yoshio Sakamoto
- Designers: Jacobo Luengo; Aleix Garrido Oberink
- Programmers: Fernando Zazo; Enrique Jesús García Amezcua
- Artist: Rafael Jimenez Rodriguez
- Composers: Kenji Yamamoto; Daisuke Matsuoka
- Series: Metroid
- Engine: Mercury Engine
- Platform: Nintendo 3DS
- Release: September 15, 2017
- Genre: Action-adventure
- Mode: Single-player

Metroid: Samus Returns is a 2017 action-adventure game developed by MercurySteam and Nintendo EPD and published by Nintendo for the Nintendo 3DS handheld game console. It is a remake of the 1991 Game Boy game Metroid II: Return of Samus. Players control series protagonist Samus Aran, a bounty hunter who is contracted by the Galactic Federation to exterminate the parasitic Metroid species on their home planet of SR388. While the story and structure parallel the original game, Samus Returns features redone graphics, updated controls and user interface, and new gameplay mechanics not seen in previous 2D Metroid titles, such as a melee counterattack and the ability to aim freely at any angle.

Development began in 2015, overseen by longtime producer Yoshio Sakamoto and directed by Takehiko Hosokawa, a game designer in the series. MercurySteam originally pitched a remake of Metroid Fusion before Sakamoto suggested remaking Metroid II. New gameplay features and areas were added to "spice up" the experience of the original game. Music was composed by Daisuke Matsuoka and directed by Kenji Yamamoto, who had co-composed the music for Super Metroid.

Samus Returns received positive reviews upon release for its visuals and improvements over the original version, with many also deeming it a return to form for the series. Some criticism was given to the controls and the counterattack mechanics. It received awards and accolades from multiple publications and awards shows, including "Best Handheld Game" at The Game Awards 2017, and "Handheld Game of the Year" at the 21st Annual D.I.C.E. Awards. Sakamoto was impressed with MercurySteam's understanding of the series, leading to their continued collaboration for Metroid Dread (2021) on the Nintendo Switch and Metroid Ravenous (2027) on the Nintendo Switch 2.

== Gameplay ==
The player controls Samus Aran from a side-scrolling perspective on the 3DS top screen, and sees the HUD and map on the bottom screen.

Metroid: Samus Returns is a side-scrolling game presented in a 2.5D perspective. Players control series protagonist Samus Aran, a bounty hunter who explores labyrinthine environments, defeats hostile aliens, and collects power-ups to access new areas. Samus Returns is a remake of the 1991 Game Boy game Metroid II: Return of Samus; it features a story and structure similar to the original game but includes updated controls, visuals, and gameplay.

The game introduces several features new to the side-scrolling Metroid games. Samus can perform a Melee Counter with her Arm Cannon to stun nearby enemies that use physical attacks. A visual cue indicates when an attack can be countered. Successfully countering an enemy places Samus in an advantageous position; against Metroids, her next shot will be fully charged, and she can fire several Missiles at them. In Metroid II, her firing direction was limited to specific angles, but in Samus Returns, she can fire freely in any direction. Samus also gains access to new abilities called Aeion abilities, which use an energy gauge. One example of an Aeion ability is the Scan Pulse, which allows Samus to scan the surrounding environment for hidden pathways and items. The game also includes Teleport Stations, enabling Samus to fast travel between areas. Several abilities introduced after Metroid II return in Samus Returns, such as the Grapple Beam, Power Bombs, and Super Missiles.

Samus Returns supports Amiibo figurines, with compatible figures based on the Metroid series. Scanning these figurines can unlock reserve tanks and a Metroid Marker, which helps locate nearby Metroids. After completing the game at least once, players can unlock Amiibo-exclusive content, including a Metroid II art gallery, a Samus Returns art gallery, a Sound Test, and Fusion Mode, an extra-hard difficulty setting featuring Samus's Fusion Suit. A standard Hard Mode is also unlocked upon completing the game, which does not require an Amiibo.

== Plot ==
In the year 20X5, a lone bounty hunter named Samus Aran is sent by the Galactic Federation to infiltrate the Space Pirate base on the planet Zebes, where she foils the Pirates' plans to use the parasitic organisms called Metroids and defeats the Pirate leader, the Mother Brain. Seeing the threat posed by the Metroids, the Federation sends a special squadron of elite soldiers to the Metroids' home planet of SR388 to investigate, but the squadron soon goes missing. After retrieving a small sampling of data confirming a Metroid presence within the planet, the Federation sends Samus to SR388 to destroy the species.

Samus lands on the surface of SR388 and explores the planet, traveling through its caverns. She encounters the Metroids in different metamorphosis stages, growing from small jellyfish-like creatures to large reptilian beasts. After killing most of the planet's Metroids, Samus finds and destroys the Queen Metroid. Shortly afterward, Samus discovers a Metroid egg that hatches in front of her. The Metroid hatchling imprints onto Samus, thinking she is its mother. Refusing to kill the infant Metroid, Samus decides to take it with her. As Samus and the infant Metroid reach the planet's surface to return to her gunship, they are attacked by a half-mechanical Ridley. After a long battle, Ridley is defeated, and Samus, along with the Metroid, leave the planet together. In a post-credits scene, a Hornoad wanders on the planet's surface, gnaws on Ridley's discarded mechanical claw before suddenly being killed and copied into a vicious form by an X Parasite.

Based on the item completion rating, players may unlock a series of images, depicting the history of the Chozo race inhabiting SR388. After landing on the planet, the Chozo encountered the X parasites, which use the planet's creatures as hosts. To this end, the Chozo created the Metroids using their advanced technology to combat the X parasites. Although the Chozo lived in peace when the X parasites were gone, the Metroids grew out of control and the civilization came under threat. A discussion was held between two Chozo leaders; the final image reveals one leader seemingly killed the other, standing over its body while overlooking its army. (Note: Identified in Metroid Dread (2021) as Raven Beak of the Mawkin warrior tribe, massacring the science-driven Thoha tribe.)

== Development ==
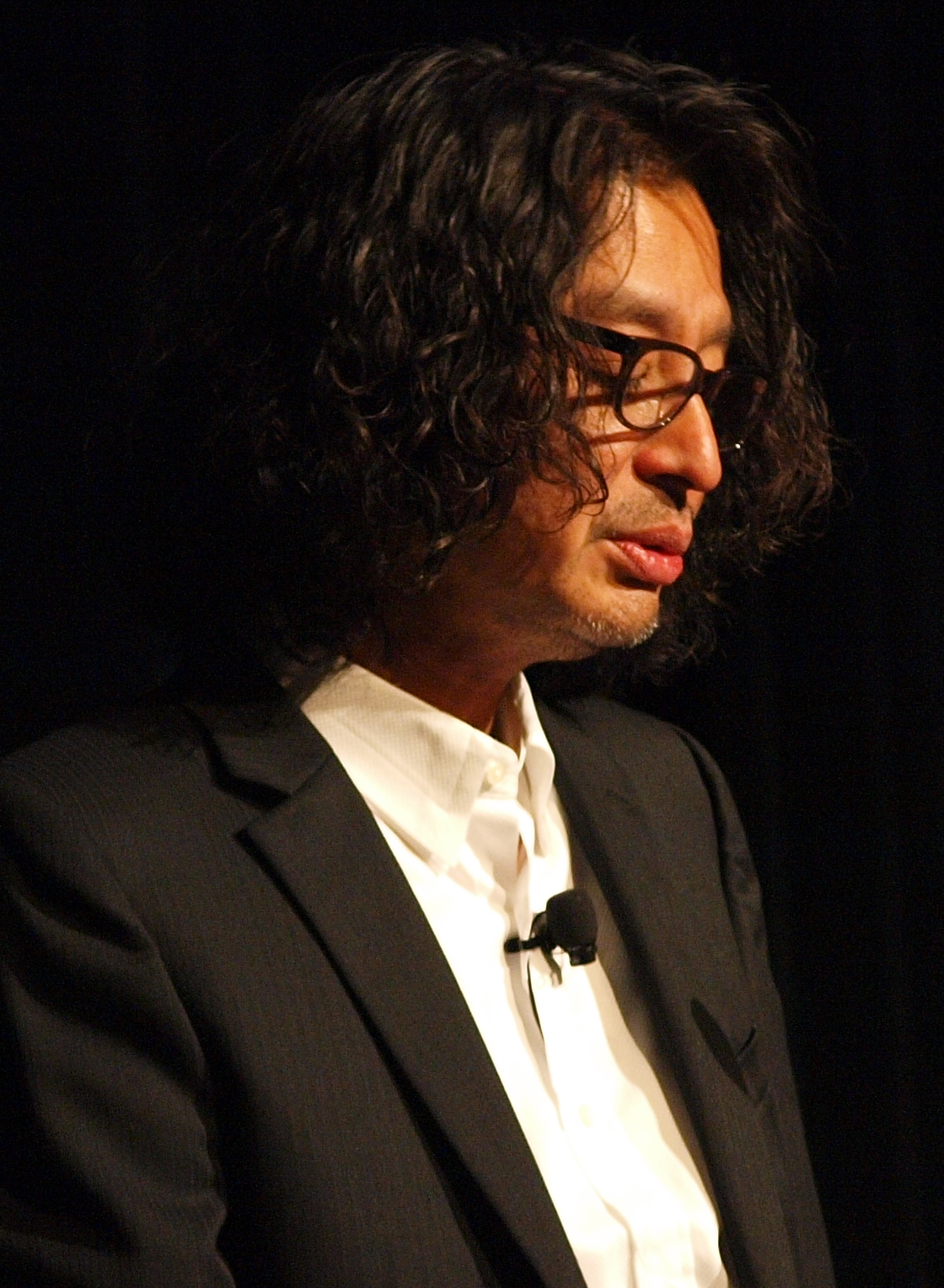
Yoshio Sakamoto of Nintendo EPD served as the game's lead producer.

Metroid: Samus Returns was developed by the Spanish studio MercurySteam in collaboration with Nintendo EPD. Yoshio Sakamoto, senior officer of Nintendo's Entertainment Planning & Development division, was the game's producer, while Takehiko Hosokawa of the same division was the director, along with Jose Luis Márquez of MercurySteam who was creative director. MercurySteam head Enric Álvarez described their collaboration with Nintendo as an "incredible" achievement, and Sakamoto in return stated that the studio was the best choice for a Metroidvania game given their "good design sensibility" and respect for the Metroid series.

Sakamoto had expressed interest in making a new 2D Metroid game, which had not been done since Metroid: Zero Mission (2004), for a few years before the game's development started in 2015. After hearing that MercurySteam, following their involvement with Castlevania: Lords of Shadow – Mirror of Fate (2013), was interested in taking on the challenge of remaking a Metroid game, he visited their studio to organise a collaboration. MercurySteam specifically pitched Nintendo a remake of Metroid Fusion (2002), but Sakamoto instead wanted to recreate Metroid II. Although Sakamoto had never worked on the original Game Boy game, he believed it to be an important entry in the Metroid series, particularly regarding its plot point of Samus encountering the last Metroid, and so he was enthusiastic about remaking it. The Nintendo 3DS was Sakamoto's platform of choice to employ the 3D visuals and a dual-screen setup offered by the portable system.

Sakamoto noted that the potential for 2D games in the Metroid franchise had opened up for Nintendo following the announcement of the game. He expressed that he was keen to evolve some of the traditions in 2D Metroid games. As a remake, he wanted to preserve some of the originality and to avoid changing things without good reason. Their approach was to add to aspects that improved upon the game's core concept of hunting the Metroids. Sakamoto hoped to start from the original game's "simple and straightforward progression" and "spice up and excite the experience", offering new gameplay features and areas to explore such as the Aeion abilities. These ideas led to some control enhancements, such as the addition of free aiming for more precise firing. The idea of a melee counterattack came from MercurySteam, who had implemented a similar parry mechanic in their Castlevania game. Sakamoto felt that the inclusion of the melee counterattack offered players an alternative combat style, in contrast to previous games where players had to rely on dodging charge attacks from enemies and then defeating them from afar.

The team moved from the pixel art of 2D Metroid games to 3D models to incorporate varied animations and use different camera angles to enhance the cutscenes. The music was composed by Daisuke Matsuoka and directed by Kenji Yamamoto, who had co-composed the music for the 1994 game Super Metroid.

== Release ==
The project was revealed during Nintendo's Treehouse livestream at the Electronic Entertainment Expo 2017 held on June 13, and was released for the Nintendo 3DS handheld game console on 15 September. A special edition version of the game includes a reversible cover and a soundtrack CD called Samus Archives, featuring 25 tracks from numerous Metroid games including Samus Returns. A European Legacy Edition version also includes a soundtrack CD, alongside a 40-page art book, a Morph Ball keyring, an S-marked pin badge, a download code for Metroid II, and a steelbook designed in the likeness of a Game Boy cartridge. Two Amiibo figurines were released alongside the game; one figurine is of Samus kneeling in the pose shown on the cover art of Metroid II, while the other is of a Metroid creature that has escaped containment. A special "Samus Edition" of the New Nintendo 3DS XL console was also released alongside the game.

== Reception ==
Reception

Aggregate scores
| Aggregator | Score |
|---|---|
| Metacritic | 85/100 |
| OpenCritic | 90% recommend |

Review scores
| Publication | Score |
|---|---|
| Destructoid | 8/10 |
| Famitsu | 8/10, 8/10, 8/10, 8/10 |
| Game Informer | 9.75/10 |
| GameSpot | 9/10 |
| IGN | 8.5/10 |
| Nintendo Life | 10/10 |
| Nintendo World Report | 9.5/10 |
| Polygon | 9/10 |
| USgamer | 5/5 |

Metroid: Samus Returns received "generally favorable reviews", according to review aggregator Metacritic. Andrew Webster at The Verge viewed Samus Returns as a return to the series' roots. Peter Brown of GameSpot believed that it represented a look at the potential future for 2D Metroid games. Russ Frushtick of Polygon thought that the game's visuals were "remarkable", while Webster thought that the game's 3D visuals made it easier and more playable than Metroid II. Webster also praised its use of the handheld's glasses-free 3D effect, stating that it added a "wonderful" sense of depth. The game's soundtrack by Daisuke Matsuoka also received praise, with Chris Carter of Destructoid calling the melodies "hauntingly beautiful". Ben Reeves of Game Informer considered the games environments to be rich in detail, noting the graphics being inspired by the Metroid Prime sub-series. Chris Scullion of Nintendo Life called it a "must-buy" for fans of the series.

Reception to the gameplay mechanics and controls were more mixed. Chris Scullion at Nintendo Life wrote that the "Scan Pulse" ability was a useful feature and made the game "far more entertaining" as a result, although Brown felt that it removed some of the thrills of discovering secrets in the game. Webster called the game's combat "fast and fluid", while Brown wrote that it was more aggressive and satisfying than expected. Frushtick considered the introduction of a counterattack ability to be a major improvement to the 2D Metroid's gameplay. Conversely, Martin Robinson of Eurogamer criticized the effect of the counterattack system, writing that it led "to a staccato rhythm to the action as you're constantly stopped in your tracks for such one-note encounters". Robinson, while believing Samus Returns fixed problems the original game had, overall considered it to be underwhelming. IGN's Samuel Claiborn complained about the controls, stating that Samus's complicated weapon options have players "working the 3DS shoulder buttons, slider, and face buttons in a downright painful way".

During its first week in the United Kingdom, Samus Returns was ranked eighth in an all-format chart. It was the third best-selling game in Japan in its debut week, with 30,855 copies sold. An additional 6,206 copies were sold the following week. It was also the eighth best-selling game in the United States during September 2017. The game returned to the top sales charts on the Nintendo 3DS eShop in June 2021 following the announcement of Metroid Dread.

=== Awards ===
Metroid: Samus Returns won the "Best Mobile Game" award at the Gamescom 2017 Awards. It also won "Best Handheld Game" at The Game Awards 2017, and won "Handheld Game of the Year" at the 21st Annual D.I.C.E. Awards. It received a nomination for "Best Spanish Game" at the Titanium Awards. At the 2017 Golden Joystick Awards, Nintendo EPD won Studio of the Year, while the game received a nomination for Nintendo Game of the Year. Samus Returns won Destructoid's award for Best Portable Game of 2017. It also won IGN's Best 3DS Game as part of their Best of 2017 Awards. The 2017 Game Critics Awards awarded Samus Returns for Best Handheld Game. GameSpot listed it as one of five best Nintendo 3DS games in 2017. Game Informer gave it the award each for "Best Mobile/Handheld Exclusive" in their "Best of 2017 Awards", and for "Best Handheld" in their 2017 Action Game of the Year Awards. In their Reader's Choice Best of 2017 Awards, the game came up at second place for "Best Mobile/Handheld Exclusive". Polygon ranked the game 30th on their list of the 50 best games of 2017. It also won the Tappan Zee Bridge Award for Best Remake at the New York Game Awards 2018. The game won the award for "Control Design, 2D or Limited 3D" at the 17th Annual National Academy of Video Game Trade Reviewers Awards, whereas its other nomination was for "Original Light Mix Score, Franchise".

== See also ==
- AM2R - fan-made remake of Metroid II

== Sources ==
- MercurySteam; Nintendo EPD (15 September 2017). Metroid: Samus Returns (Nintendo 3DS). Nintendo.
