= Drag x Drive =

2025 video game

- Developer: Nintendo EPD
- Publisher: Nintendo
- Director: Yoshinori Konishi
- Producer: Hisashi Nogami
- Programmer: Yoshinori Konishi
- Artist: Takahisa Ikejiri
- Composer: Sayako Doi
- Platform: Nintendo Switch 2
- Release: August 14, 2025
- Genre: Sports
- Mode: Multiplayer

Drag x Drive (Note: Pronounced "Drag and Drive") (Note: Japanese: ドラッグ アンド ドライブ, Hepburn: Doraggu Ando Doraibu) is a 2025 sports video game developed and published by Nintendo for the Nintendo Switch 2. The game resembles wheelchair basketball and has players compete in 3v3 matches. The game was designed to take advantage of the Joy-Con 2's mouse mode, with players using motion controls to mimic using a wheelchair to move.

Drag x Drive was one of the first titles revealed for the Nintendo Switch 2 during its debut Nintendo Direct. It released on August 14, 2025, to mixed reviews.

== Gameplay ==
A player raising their arm to signal their teammate to pass the ball

Drag x Drive is a sports video game centered around wheelchair basketball. The player controls a robot in a wheelchair-like vehicle (Note: According to Nintendo, they are called "vehicles".) with the goal of shooting a basketball into the opponent's basket. Matches are split between two teams of threes with the goal of scoring more points than the other team by the end of the match. The player controls the robot using the Joy-Con 2's mouse mode to mimic the motions of using a wheelchair. Each Joy-Con controls one wheel; moving both Joy-Con moves the wheelchair forward, whereas moving only one turns it. Due to the Joy-Con 2's haptic feedback, performing this motion imitates surfaces such as concrete through vibrations. Shooting the ball requires the use of motion controls, with the player required to raise their arms and flick the Joy-Con whilst aiming at the hoop. Depending on how far the player throws the ball, the more points earned when scoring. Additionally, the player can raise their arms in order to signal teammates to pass the ball as well as clap. Players automatically grab the ball if it's on the ground, or they can ram into their opponents to make them lose control of the ball. In addition, the player may hold their hands out when the opponent is taking a shot to block the ball from making it to the hoop

Matches are set within dark arenas fitted with bright, neon lights. The perimeters of the basketball court are fitted with half-pipes, allowing players to perform tricks on them as well as slam dunk the ball into the hoop.

== Development and release ==
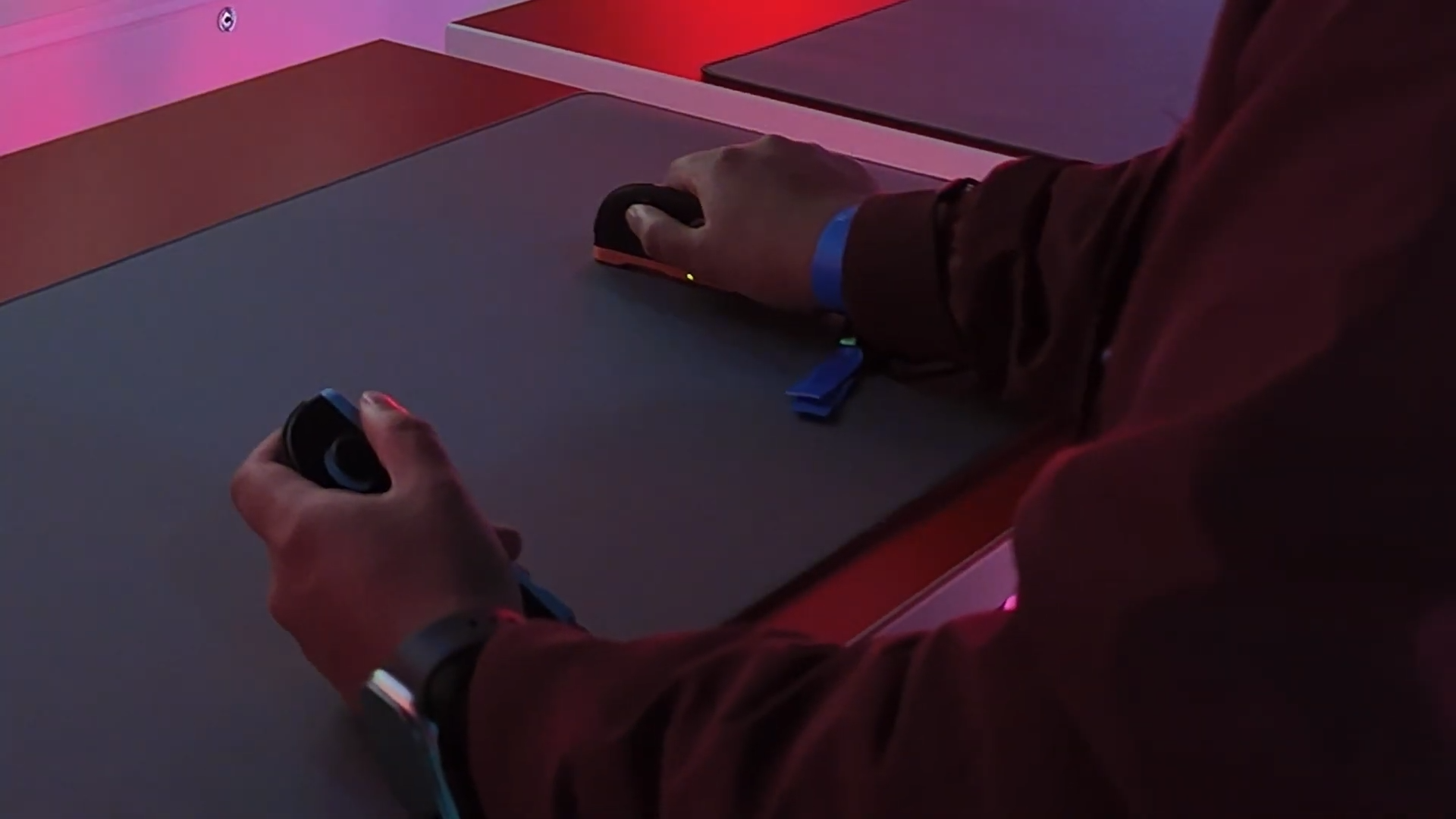
The Joy-Con 2 being used in mouse mode

Drag x Drive was announced during an April 2025 Nintendo Direct presentation focused on the Nintendo Switch 2, slated for Summer 2025. The game was made available to play for both journalists and the public during Nintendo Switch 2 Experience events.

After the launch of the Nintendo Switch 2, the Nintendo Today! app confirmed a release date of August 14 alongside a live demo between August 9-10. The demo, Drag x Drive Global Jam, allowed Nintendo Switch Online members to try the game before the final release. The title released August 14, 2025, exclusively on the Nintendo eShop.

== Reception ==
=== Pre-release ===
Upon the announcement of the game, some critics praised the game for representing disabilities in a positive light, with Alana Hagues from Nintendo Life writing how it was a fantastic spotlight of wheelchair sports, as well as disabilities in sports as a whole, due to a lack of wheelchair sports representation within video games. However, Video Games Chronicle's Chris Scullion noted how he thought it was strange Nintendo avoided calling them wheelchairs in favour of vehicles, believing Nintendo was "being overly squeamish about a future scandal that will never happen, instead of embracing the game’s disabled representation".

Feedback on the gameplay overall was mixed, with some journalists who attended Nintendo Switch 2 preview events recount feeling aches and pains after playing, with Hagues reporting it as "a workout for your arms". However, other critics responded more positively to the gameplay, with Kate Kozuch from Tom's Guide praising the controls as feeling immersive, mentioning the game having "serious competitive potential". Writing for Nintendojo, Robert Marrujo described the controls as feeling natural and easy to learn, noting that the controls felt "arcade-like". Many critics compared Drag x Drive's aesthetics and gameplay to the 2015 video game Rocket League, with GamesRadar+'s Rollin Bishop characterising the gameplay of Drag x Drive "something akin to Rocket League combined with Wii Sports Resort's basketball and wind-up cars".

=== Post-release ===
Reception

Aggregate scores
Aggregator	Score
Metacritic	60/100 (Note: Score based on 76 reviews)
OpenCritic	18% recommended (Note: Score based on 67 reviews)

Review scores
Publication	Score
Destructoid	6.5/10
Digital Trends	3.5/5
Famitsu	31/40
Game Informer	6.75/10
GameSpot	5/10
GamesRadar+	2.5/5
HobbyConsolas	78/100
IGN	6/10
Nintendo Life	7/10
PCMag	2.5/5
Shacknews	6/10
TechRadar	3/5
The Games Machine (Italy)	6.5/10
The Guardian	2/5
Video Games Chronicle	3/5

Drag x Drive received "mixed or average" reviews according to review aggregator website Metacritic. OpenCritic determined that 18% of critics recommended the game. In Japan, four critics from Famitsu gave the game a total score of 31 out of 40.
