= Spacelords =

Online action-adventure video game

- Raiders of the Broken Planet logo
- Developer: MercurySteam
- Publisher: MercurySteam
- Producer: David Cox
- Engine: Mercury Engine
- Platforms: Microsoft Windows; PlayStation 4; Xbox One; PlayStation 5; Xbox Series X/S
- Release: Microsoft Windows, PlayStation 4, Xbox One: WW: September 22, 2017; Xbox Series X/S: WW: November 10, 2020; PlayStation 5: WW: November 19, 2020
- Genre: Action-adventure
- Modes: Single-player, multiplayer

Spacelords (previously known as Raiders of the Broken Planet) is an online free-to-play action-adventure video game developed and published by Spanish studio MercurySteam. It was released for Microsoft Windows, PlayStation 4 and Xbox One on September 22, 2017, and for PlayStation 5 and Xbox Series X/S in November 2020.

Spacelords is an asymmetric online adventure game. There are gameplay elements which task the players to shoot and brawl and utilize strategy. A story mode, which will be released episodically, is also planned.

== Development ==
Development for the game had already begun before the release of MercurySteam's previous game, Castlevania: Lords of Shadow 2. Dave Cox, the producer of the Castlevania franchise, revealed that some of the abandoned gameplay elements for Lords of Shadow 2, such as the combat mechanics, may be featured in the company's next game. In March 2016, Cox announced his partnership with MercurySteam and that the company was working on a new game with a sci-fi setting. Enric Alvarez, the head of MercurySteam, further described the project as one of the company's most "ambitious" titles. The game was teased by MercurySteam multiple times before it was officially announced in April 2016. MercurySteam self-published Raiders of the Broken Planet for PlayStation 4, Microsoft Windows and Xbox One on September 22, 2017. A beta test for the Windows version was held before the game's official release.

On July 21, 2018, MercurySteam announced the new name for the game as Spacelords and planned to go free-to-play by giving players access to all four campaigns (a total of 16 multi-stage missions) at once, accessible in any order they choose. They also released a new progression system, allowing players to access the game's entire character roster. The game was also released for PlayStation 5 and Xbox Series X/S in November 2020 as a launch title for the consoles.
