= Nintendo Entertainment Planning & Development =

Division of Nintendo

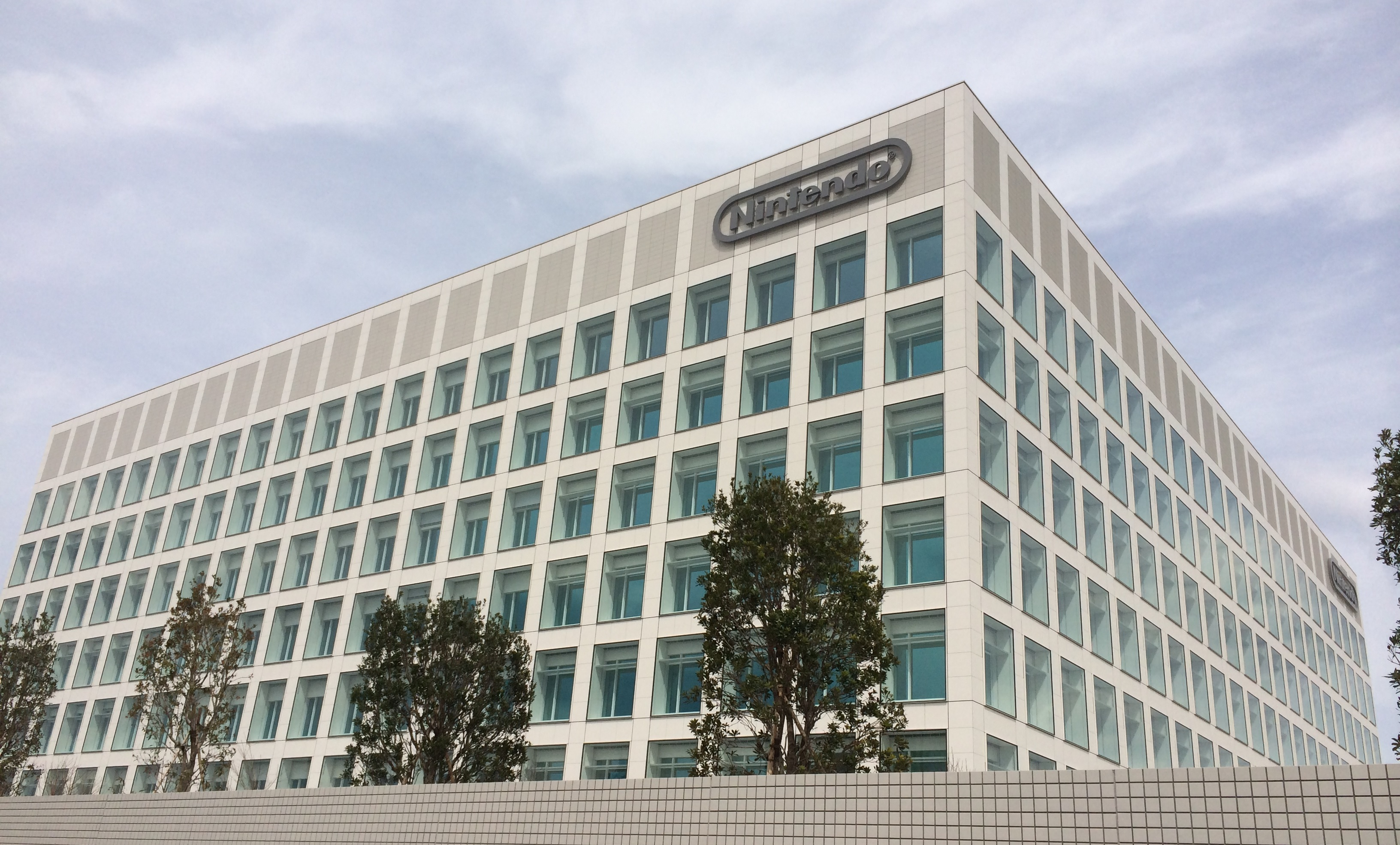
- Exterior of the Nintendo Development Center in Kyoto
- Native name: 任天堂企画制作本部
- Romanized name: Nintendō Kikaku Seisaku Honbu
- Type: Division
- Industry: Video games
- Predecessors: Nintendo EAD; Nintendo SPD
- Founded: September 16, 2015; 11 years ago
- Headquarters: Kyoto, Japan
- Number of locations: 2 (Kyoto and Tokyo)
- Key people: Executive General Manager; Shinya Takahashi; Senior General Manager; Yoshiaki Koizumi; Deputy General Managers; Katsuya Eguchi; Hisashi Nogami; Senior Officers; Takashi Tezuka; Yoshio Sakamoto; Eiji Aonuma; Koji Kondo
- Brands: Animal Crossing; Big Brain Academy; Brain Age; Donkey Kong; The Legend of Zelda; Mario Kart; Metroid; Pikmin; Rhythm Heaven; Splatoon; Star Fox; Super Mario; Tomodachi Life
- Parent: Nintendo
- Divisions: Co-Production Group; Production Group No. 3; Production Group No. 4; Production Group No. 5; Production Group No. 6; Production Group No. 7; Production Group No. 8; Production Group No. 9; Production Group No. 10; Smart Device Production Group; Programming Management Group; Design Management Group; Sound Management Group

Nintendo Entertainment Planning & Development Division, (Note: Japanese: 任天堂企画制作本部, Hepburn: Nintendō Kikaku Seisaku Honbu) abbreviated Nintendo EPD, is the largest division within the Japanese video game company Nintendo. The division focuses on developing and producing video games, mobile apps, and other related entertainment software for the company. Nintendo EPD was established in September 2015 after merging their Entertainment Analysis & Development and Software Planning & Development divisions.

== History ==
The division was created on September 16, 2015, after the consolidation of two of Nintendo's former software divisions, Entertainment Analysis & Development (EAD) and Software Planning & Development (SPD), as part of a company-wide organizational restructure under Nintendo's newly appointed president, Tatsumi Kimishima.

The division assumed both of its predecessors' roles, focusing on the development of games and software for Nintendo platforms and mobile devices; it also manages and licenses the company's various intellectual properties, alongside producing and supervising development for external studios.

Shinya Takahashi, former general manager of Nintendo SPD, has the same title in EPD, with Yoshiaki Koizumi, Katsuya Eguchi, Eiji Aonuma, and Hisashi Nogami as deputy general managers, and Yoshio Sakamoto and Takashi Tezuka as senior officers. Kensuke Tanabe was previously a senior officer until his departure in 2026. The others had been in such positions since the division's formation, Nogami was promoted in 2017, and Aonuma and Tanabe and were promoted into higher positions within the division in 2019. By 2023, Takahashi and Koizumi were promoted to more senior positions, with Aonuma, and sound designer Koji Kondo named senior officers.

== Structure ==
Mainly located in Kyoto, the Nintendo division works similarly to its two predecessors before the merger and is divided into many groups. It has ten production groups responsible for development or production of games, each of them having their own managers, producers and project leads working on specific series and focus, with them using the pool of talents in the division for each project. In the overall division, the general manager, deputy general managers, and senior officers oversee different aspects in those production groups.

The division also houses the Programming Management, Design Management, and Sound Management groups.

There are currently 10 production groups known within Nintendo EPD:

- Co-Production Group, previously known as Production Group No. 2 until 2023, produces most of the games developed by external studios (Note: Acquire, Camelot Software Planning, HAL Laboratory, Intelligent Systems and Monolith Soft.) and published by Nintendo, such as the Mario Tennis, Kirby, Pokémon, Xenoblade, Fire Emblem and Mario & Luigi series. It consists of staff from a former Production Group No. 1 that was merged into the group in 2020.
- Production Group No. 3 develops the main The Legend of Zelda series.
- Production Group No. 4 develops casual and experimental games such as Miitopia, 1-2-Switch, Nintendo Labo, Ring Fit Adventure, Jump Rope Challenge, Game Builder Garage, Big Brain Academy: Brain vs. Brain, Nintendo Switch Sports, Everybody 1-2-Switch! and Tomodachi Life: Living the Dream. It consists of staff from a former Production Group No. 7 that was merged into the group in 2023. The division also co-developed Alarmo with Nintendo TDD.
- Production Group No. 5, with group manager Aya Kyogoku, develops the Animal Crossing and Splatoon series, and Drag x Drive.
- Production Group No. 6 oversee and produce games developed by external studios and published by Nintendo, such as the Paper Mario, Metroid Prime and Luigi's Mansion series.
- Production Group No. 7 developed Miitomo and co-develops 2D Metroid games with MercurySteam and Famicom Detective Club games with MAGES.
- Production Group No. 8, also known as Nintendo EPD Tokyo, develops the 3D Super Mario games and 3D Donkey Kong games.
- Production Group No. 9 develops the Mario Kart series and Arms.
- Production Group No. 10 develops 2D Super Mario games (including Super Mario Maker) and the Pikmin series.
- Smart Device Production Group, develops smartphone games alongside other EPD groups as well as produce games by external studios.

== Games developed ==
List of video games developed by Nintendo Entertainment Planning & Development
Year	Title	Genre(s)	Platform(s)	Notes	Ref.
2015	The Legend of Zelda: Tri Force Heroes	Action-adventure	Nintendo 3DS	Co-developed with Grezzo	
2015	Animal Crossing: Amiibo Festival	Party	Wii U	Co-developed with NDCube	
2016	Miitomo	Social networking service	Android, iOS	—N/a	
2016	Star Fox Zero	Shoot 'em up	Wii U	Co-developed with PlatinumGames	
2016	Star Fox Guard	Tower defense	Wii U	Co-developed with PlatinumGames	
2016	Animal Crossing: New Leaf - Welcome Amiibo	Social simulation	Nintendo 3DS	—N/a	
2016	Miitopia	Role-playing	Nintendo 3DS	—N/a	
2016	Super Mario Run	Platformer	Android, iOS	—N/a	
2017	The Legend of Zelda: Breath of the Wild	Action-adventure	Nintendo Switch; Wii U	—N/a	
2017	1-2-Switch	Party	Nintendo Switch	—N/a	
2017	Mario Kart 8 Deluxe	Kart racing	Nintendo Switch	—N/a	
2017	Arms	Fighting	Nintendo Switch	—N/a	
2017	Splatoon 2	Third-person shooter	Nintendo Switch	—N/a	
2017	Metroid: Samus Returns	Metroidvania	Nintendo 3DS	Co-developed with MercurySteam	
2017	Animal Crossing: Pocket Camp	Social simulation	Android, iOS	Co-developed with NDCube	
2017	Super Mario Odyssey	Platformer	Nintendo Switch	—N/a	
2018	Nintendo Labo (Note: Nintendo Labo is a brand of cardboard-based DIY construction sets that use the Nintendo Switch, with included software, and its Joy-Con controllers in a variety of ways.)	Construction set	Nintendo Switch	—N/a	
2018	Captain Toad: Treasure Tracker	Puzzle-platformer	Nintendo Switch	Co-developed with Nintendo Software Technology	
2019	New Super Mario Bros. U Deluxe	Platformer	Nintendo Switch	—N/a	
2019	Super Mario Maker 2	Platformer	Nintendo Switch	—N/a	
2019	Dr. Mario World	Puzzle	Android, iOS	Co-developed with LINE and NHN Entertainment	
2019	Mario Kart Tour	Kart racing	Android, iOS	—N/a	
2019	Ring Fit Adventure	Exergame	Nintendo Switch	—N/a	
2019	Dr Kawashima's Brain Training for Nintendo Switch	Puzzle	Nintendo Switch	Co-developed with indieszero	
2020	Animal Crossing: New Horizons	Life simulation	Nintendo Switch	—N/a	
2020	Super Mario 3D All-Stars	Platformer	Nintendo Switch	Co-developed with 1-Up Studio, iQue and Nintendo European Research & Development	
2020	Pikmin 3 Deluxe	Real-time strategy	Nintendo Switch	Co-developed with Eighting	
2021	Bowser's Fury	Platformer	Nintendo Switch	Co-developed with Nintendo Software Technology	
2021	Game Builder Garage	Programming	Nintendo Switch	—N/a	
2021	Metroid Dread	Metroidvania	Nintendo Switch	Co-developed with MercurySteam	
2021	Big Brain Academy: Brain vs. Brain	Puzzle	Nintendo Switch	Co-developed with indieszero	
2022	Nintendo Switch Sports	Sports	Nintendo Switch	Version 1.5.0 update co-developed with Eighting	
2022	Splatoon 3	Third-person shooter	Nintendo Switch	—N/a	
2023	The Legend of Zelda: Tears of the Kingdom	Action-adventure	Nintendo Switch	—N/a	
2023	Everybody 1-2-Switch!	Party	Nintendo Switch	Co-developed with NDcube	
2023	Pikmin 4	Real-time strategy	Nintendo Switch	Co-developed with Eighting	
2023	Super Mario Bros. Wonder	Platformer	Nintendo Switch	—N/a	
2024	Nintendo World Championships: NES Edition	Action	Nintendo Switch	Co-developed with indieszero	
2024	Emio – The Smiling Man: Famicom Detective Club	Adventure	Nintendo Switch	Co-developed with MAGES	
2024	The Legend of Zelda: Echoes of Wisdom	Action-adventure	Nintendo Switch	Co-developed with Grezzo	
2025	Mario Kart World	Kart racing	Nintendo Switch 2	—N/a	
2025	Nintendo Switch 2 Welcome Tour	Tech demo	Nintendo Switch 2	Co-developed with Nintendo Cube	
2025	Donkey Kong Bananza	Platformer	Nintendo Switch 2	—N/a	
2025	Drag x Drive	Sports	Nintendo Switch 2	—N/a	
2025	Super Mario Galaxy + Super Mario Galaxy 2	Platformer	Nintendo Switch	Co-developed with Nintendo Software Technology	
2026	Super Mario Bros. Wonder – Nintendo Switch 2 Edition + Meetup in Bellabel Park	Platformer	Nintendo Switch 2	—N/a	
2026	Tomodachi Life: Living the Dream	Life simulation	Nintendo Switch	—N/a	
2026	Pictonico!	Party	Android, iOS	Co-developed with Intelligent Systems	
2026	Rhythm Heaven Groove	Rhythm	Nintendo Switch	—N/a	
2026	Splatoon Raiders	Third-person shooter	Nintendo Switch 2	—N/a	
2026	Nintendo Switch Sports Resort	Sports	Nintendo Switch 2	—N/a	
2026	The Legend of Zelda: Ocarina of Time	Action-adventure	Nintendo Switch 2	—N/a	
2026	Pikmin 4 – Nintendo Switch 2 Edition + Dandori Academy	Real-time strategy	Nintendo Switch 2	Co-developed with Eighting	
2027	Metroid Ravenous	Metroidvania	Nintendo Switch 2	Co-developed with MercurySteam	
