= Bō: Path of the Teal Lotus =

2024 video game

- Developer: Squid Shock Studios
- Publishers: Humble Games; Raredrop Games (Porting to consoles)
- Director: Christopher Stair
- Producer: Robert Maloney
- Programmer: Trevor Youngquist
- Artists: Christopher Stair; Alexis Cabrera; Mikami Kamijo; Lisa Buttinger
- Writer: Christopher Stair
- Composers: Moisés Camargo; Manami Kiyota
- Engine: Unity
- Platforms: Nintendo Switch; Windows; PlayStation 5; Xbox Series X/S
- Release: WW: 17 July 2024
- Genres: Platform, action-adventure
- Mode: Single player

Bō: Path of the Teal Lotus is an action-adventure platform game developed by Squid Shock Studios and published by Humble Games, and published by Raredrop Games on home consoles. It was released on 17 July 2024, for Microsoft Windows, Nintendo Switch, PlayStation 5 and Xbox Series X/S. It was the final game Humble Games published before effectively being closed on 23 July.

== Premise ==
The game follows Bō, a fox spirit born from a celestial blossom in the heavens, who journeys through a world based on Japanese folklore and mythology in order to fulfill an ancient prophecy.

== Gameplay ==
The player controls Bō, who gains new abilities that allow access to previously inaccessible areas. Bō wields a shapeshifting bō that can gain new transformations through teas and can be aided in combat by daruma found throughout the world.

== Development ==
Creative director Christopher Stair began work on the game in early 2021 as a solo developer using the Unity engine, with lead programmer Trevor Youngquist joining soon after as lead programmer. Milton Guasti and Robert Sephazon, the lead developer and producers of AM2R, were announced to be an associate designer and producer on the game. The game was first revealed with a Kickstarter campaign in February 2022, with Squid Shock raising $174,999 from almost 4,000 backers. One of the goals reached was a Nintendo Switch port of the game.

A proper reveal of Bō: Path of the Teal Lotus was announced at a Humble Games Showcase livestream in May 2023. The game was also showcased at Gamescom in August the same year. In February 2024, the companies announced a 18 July launch date. However, the release date was moved to one day earlier on 17 July.

Soon after the game was officially released, publisher Humble Games announced it was laying off all 36 of its staff. Following the shutdown, Squid Shock said that it had lost access to backend support, making it impossible to update console versions of the game for the time being, and would use Patreon to help fund future support for the game.

== Reception ==
Reception

Aggregate scores
Aggregator	Score
Metacritic	(PC) 77/100 (PS5) 74/100
OpenCritic	73% recommend

Bō: Path of the Teal Lotus received "generally favorable" from critics, according to review aggregator Metacritic. Fellow review aggregator OpenCritic assessed that the game received strong approval, being recommended by 73% of critics.

=== Accolades ===
Date	Award	Category	Result	Ref.
19 December 2024	The Indie Game Awards	Visual Design	Nominated	
14 March 2025	Digy Awards	Most Beautiful	Nominated	
25 January 2024	Algeria Game Awards	Best Metroidvania	Nominated	
March 2025	GAMESCOM Latam Big Festival	Best Art	Nominated	
July 2024	Bit Summit	Visual Excellence	Nominated	
