= Scrapland =

2004 video game

American McGee Presents: Scrapland
- Developer: MercurySteam
- Publishers: NA: Enlight Software (Note: Remastered version published by MercurySteam.); EU/AU: Deep Silver
- Director: Enrique Alvarez
- Producer: American McGee
- Designers: Enrique Alvarez; Luis Miguel Quijada; Darío Halle; Raúl Rubio-Munárriz
- Programmers: Carlos Rodríguez; Darío Halle
- Artist: Rafael Jiménez
- Writer: Enrique Alvarez
- Composers: Eugeni Martínez; Oscar Araujo
- Platforms: Windows, Xbox
- Release: November 4, 2004: Windows; NA: November 4, 2004; EU: March 18, 2005; Xbox; NA: March 7, 2005; EU: March 18, 2005; AU: April 7, 2005; Remastered; Windows; WW: December 13, 2021
- Genre: Action-adventure
- Modes: Single-player, multiplayer

American McGee Presents: Scrapland is a 2004 action-adventure video game developed by MercurySteam, with American McGee as an executive producer and published by Enlight Software. A remastered version was released for Windows on December 13, 2021.

== Setting ==
Scrapland's story is set in the robot-populated world of the same name, also known by the inhabitants as Chimera, which seems like a giant asteroid vastly industrialized as a metropolis and surrounded by a world-scaled energy field and an orbital ring, both used to control entrance and exit of the planet.

== Development and release ==
According to American McGee, the game was designed and produced by Enrique Alvarez, the studio head at MercurySteam. McGee does not take credit for the game's development, referring to himself as "just the marketing tool". Alvarez pitched the idea for Scrapland to McGee while McGee was working as an executive producer at Enlight. The game was in development for 2 years.

The game was initially released for Windows in North America on November 4, 2004. A port for Xbox shipped on March 4, 2005, and arrived on store shelves three days later on March 7. Both versions were released in Europe on March 18, 2005. The Xbox port was released in Australia on April 7, 2005.

== Reception ==
Reception

Aggregate score
Aggregator	Score	
Aggregator	PC	Xbox
Metacritic	72/100	73/100

Review scores
Publication	Score	
Publication	PC	Xbox
Computer Games Magazine	3.5/5	N/A
Computer Gaming World	4/5	N/A
Electronic Gaming Monthly	N/A	6.17/10
Game Informer	6/10	6.5/10
GamePro	3/5	3/5
GameSpot	7.6/10	7.6/10
GameSpy	3/5	4/5
GameZone	8.4/10	8/10
IGN	8.3/10	8.2/10
Official Xbox Magazine (US)	N/A	6.3/10
PC Gamer (US)	66%	N/A

Scrapland received "average" reviews on both platforms according to video game review aggregator website Metacritic. Game Informer criticized the Xbox version's on-foot sections, "which would appear to be in the game for the sole purpose of annoying people. Scrap indeed." IGN gave the same console version a more positive review, saying "I would have liked to have seen more variety and lateral flexibility in the single-player... Overall, the game's refreshing sense of personality wins out over everything else."

The editors of Computer Gaming World nominated Scrapland for their 2004 "Action Game of the Year" award, which ultimately went to The Chronicles of Riddick: Escape from Butcher Bay.
