= Metroid Dread =

2021 video game

- Digital art
- Developers: MercurySteam; Nintendo EPD
- Publisher: Nintendo
- Directors: Jose Luis Márquez; Fumi Hayashi
- Producer: Yoshio Sakamoto
- Designers: Jose Maria Navarro Herrera; Carlos Zarzuela Sánchez; Jacobo Luengo
- Programmer: Alfonso Valladolid Ferrández
- Artist: Jorge Benedito Chicharro
- Composers: Kenji Yamamoto; Soshi Abe; Sayako Doi
- Series: Metroid
- Engine: Mercury Engine
- Platform: Nintendo Switch
- Release: October 8, 2021
- Genre: Action-adventure
- Mode: Single-player

Metroid Dread (Note: Alternatively announced as Metroid 5) is a 2021 action-adventure game developed by MercurySteam and Nintendo EPD and published by Nintendo for the Nintendo Switch. Released on October 8, 2021, Dread is the ninth main Metroid game following Metroid: Other M (2010), and a sequel to Metroid Fusion (2002). It retains the side-scrolling gameplay of previous Metroid games and incorporates stealth elements. Players control the bounty hunter Samus Aran as she investigates the source of a mysterious transmission on the planet ZDR.

The Metroid producer, Yoshio Sakamoto, conceived Dread for the Nintendo DS in the mid-2000s, but development ended due to technical limitations. Industry commentators expressed interest in a new 2D Metroid game, and listed Dread in their "most wanted" lists. After their work on Metroid: Samus Returns (2017), Sakamoto appointed MercurySteam to develop Dread. It was announced at E3 2021.

Metroid Dread was named one of the best games of 2021 by multiple outlets. At the Game Awards 2021, it received two nominations, including Game of the Year and winning for Best Action/Adventure Game. It became the fastest-selling Metroid game in Japan, the UK and the US, and has sold more than three million copies, making it the best-selling Metroid game. A sequel, Metroid Ravenous, is scheduled for 2027 for the Nintendo Switch 2.

== Gameplay ==
Samus Aran hiding from an E.M.M.I. robot using the Phantom Cloak

Metroid Dread is an action-adventure game in which players control bounty hunter Samus Aran as she explores the planet ZDR. It retains the side-scrolling gameplay of previous Metroid games, alongside the free-aim and melee attacks added in Samus Returns (2017). As the player explores, they discover new items and weapons, allowing them to access new areas.

Dread features stealth mechanics, with Samus avoiding the E.M.M.I. robots in certain areas by hiding, reducing her noise, and using the Phantom Cloak, camouflage that makes her invisible but slows her movement. If an E.M.M.I. catches Samus, the player has two narrow windows in which they have to perform melee counters and escape. If they fail, Samus is killed. E.M.M.I.s can only be destroyed when Samus obtains the temporary "Omega Blaster" upgrade, which is lost upon using it to destroy one; destroying an E.M.M.I. however grants Samus a new permanent upgrade. Upgrades can also be found by finding Chozo statues or destroying a Core-X like in previous games. Players unlock images in an in-game gallery based on their completion time, difficulty level, and percentage of items collected.

== Plot ==
The Galactic Federation receives evidence that the X, a dangerous species of parasite that can mimic any creature it infects, survives on the remote planet ZDR. They dispatch seven E.M.M.I. (Extraplanetary Multiform Mobile Identifier) robots to ZDR to investigate, but lose contact. The Federation sends Samus Aran to ZDR to investigate.

Underground, Samus encounters a mysterious Chozo warrior who destroys the exit, defeats her in combat, and strips her suit of most of its abilities. Her ship's computer, Adam, instructs her to find another path to the surface and return to her ship. Samus is attacked by the E.M.M.I., which have been reprogrammed. She escapes and absorbs a mysterious energy from one of the planet's central units. The energy temporarily enables the Omega Blaster, with which she destroys the E.M.M.I. and regains some of her abilities. In the process, she finds that her old foe Kraid survived the destruction of the planet Zebes (Note: As depicted in Super Metroid (1994).) and slays him in combat.

In Ferenia, Samus is captured by another E.M.M.I., but is saved by a Chozo named Quiet Robe, who deactivates it. Quiet Robe explains that long ago, two Chozo tribes, the scientific Thoha and the warrior Mawkin, banded together to trap the Metroids on the planet SR388. The Thoha intended to destroy SR388, but the Mawkin leader Raven Beak, the Chozo warrior Samus encountered earlier, wanted to use the Metroids as a bioweapon to conquer the galaxy. He slaughtered the Thoha tribe and spared Quiet Robe so the Metroids could be controlled with his Thoha DNA. He planned to use ZDR to house Metroids, but was forced to pause his plans when an infestation of the X broke out. While he fought to contain the outbreak, Samus eradicated the Metroids from SR388. Raven Beak reprogrammed the E.M.M.I.s and lured Samus to ZDR to extract the Metroid DNA implanted in her, (Note: As depicted in Metroid Fusion (2002)) which would allow him to revive the Metroids.

Quiet Robe opens a barrier to allow Samus to progress before he is assassinated by one of Raven Beak's robotic soldiers. Adam encourages Samus to defeat Raven Beak and destroy ZDR. In Elun, Samus encounters the X parasites and inadvertently releases them into the rest of the planet. One of the X infects Quiet Robe's corpse and reactivates the remaining E.M.M.I. robots. Samus arrives on the surface, where she is attacked by the last of the E.M.M.I. She destroys it by sapping its energy with her hand, a power that her Metroid DNA has granted her. As a side-effect, Samus is slowly becoming a Metroid.

On the floating fortress of Itorash, Samus confronts Raven Beak, who has been masquerading as Adam. Raven Beak reveals that he spared her before so that she would awaken her Metroid powers, at which point he would clone her to create an army of the most powerful Metroid of all. Samus battles Raven Beak and is nearly killed, but the Metroid abilities within her grant her incredible power. Samus attacks Raven Beak, draining energy from Itorash and causing it to crash into ZDR. Raven Beak is infected by an X that had possessed Kraid's corpse earlier, and Samus uses her new-found powers to destroy the X. Samus reaches her ship as ZDR begins to self-destruct, but is warned by Adam not to use it due to her energy-draining Metroid powers. The X mimicking Quiet Robe appears and allows itself to be absorbed into Samus to neutralize her Metroid abilities, allowing her to escape the planet before it explodes.

== Development ==
=== Nintendo DS version ===
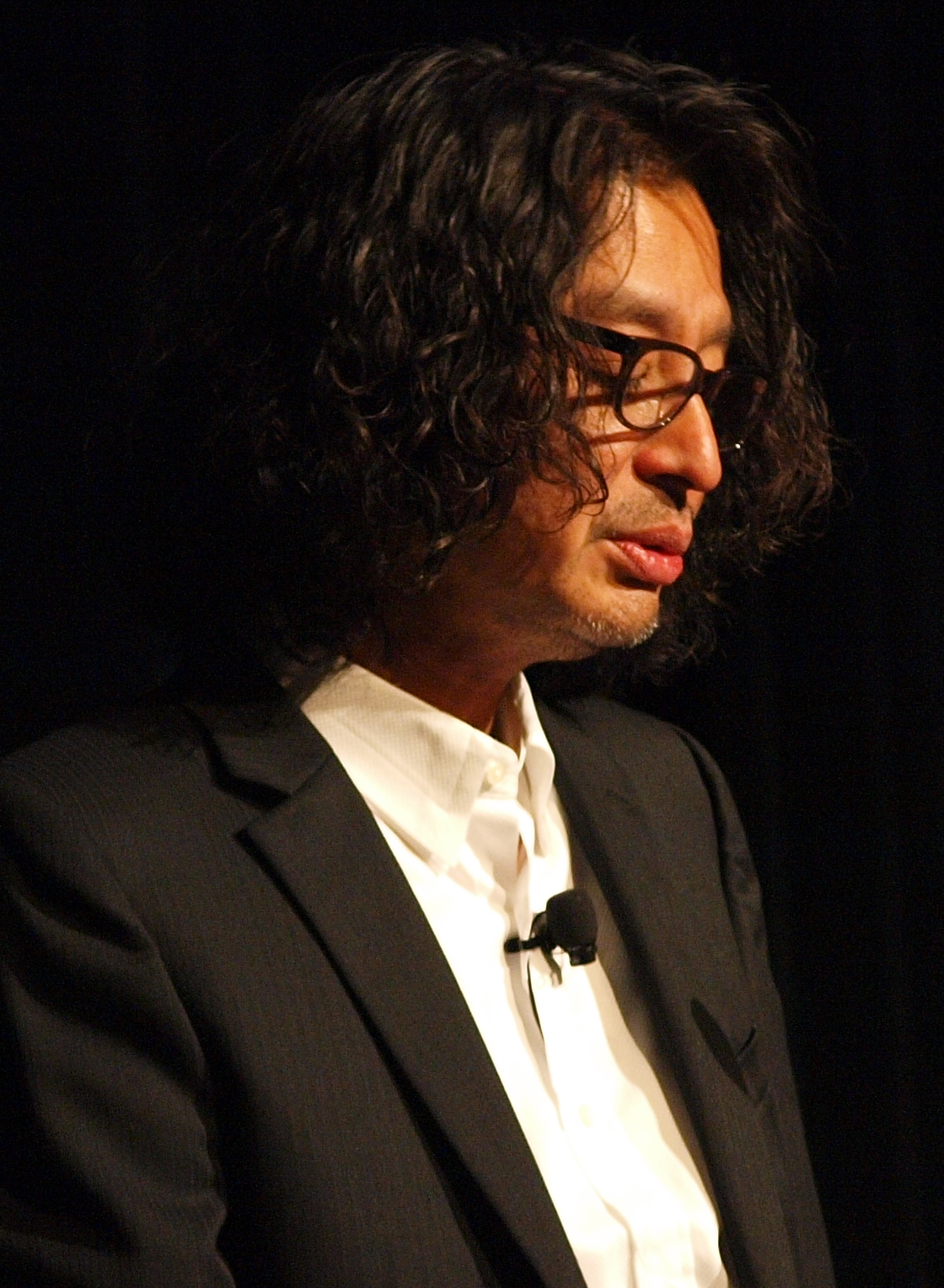
Yoshio Sakamoto at the 2010 Game Developers Conference

The Metroid producer, Yoshio Sakamoto, conceived Metroid Dread for the handheld Nintendo DS console. It came from the concept of having Samus followed by "dread" on an unfamiliar planet. Sakamoto wanted to expand on the stealth sequences in Metroid Fusion (2002) and combine them with traditional Metroid gameplay. Though he did not want Dread to be a horror game, he aimed to explore "fear-based gameplay".

Development for DS began around 2005. The title Metroid Dread first appeared that year on an internal Nintendo software list of "key DS games set to be announced in the future", triggering expectation that it would appear at the E3 conference. There was no public announcement, but a plot summary was shown to select members of the press at E3 2005, including the IGN journalist Craig Harris. In late 2005, rumors spread that Metroid Dread had been canceled or was in development hell. A release date of November 2006 was listed in the February issue of Official Nintendo Magazine. The March issue listed a release date for 2006, with a suggestion to look to E3 2006 for further details, but Dread did not appear. According to an episode of IGN's Nintendo Voice podcast, Nintendo "pulled the plug at the last minute" on this version.

A message reading "Experiment status report update: Metroid project 'Dread' is nearing the final stages of completion" appears in the 2007 game Metroid Prime 3: Corruption, developed by Retro Studios. The Corruption director, Mark Pacini, and the producer Bryan Walker denied any connection and said that it was coincidental. The Wired writer Chris Kohler expressed skepticism over the denial. ComingSoon reported that Mike Wikan, a senior designer on Corruption, posted on a fan forum that the reference was a joke. In the Japanese version of Corruption, released later that year, the message instead refers to a "dread class turret". Fans visited Retro Studios in Texas asking for information about Dread. Following the Corruption launch, Nintendo released a statement denying that a 2D Metroid game was in development.

A second attempt at developing Dread was made around 2008. A playable prototype was shown to Nintendo Software Technology and Nintendo of America staff at E3 2009. The project reportedly did not retain the Dread title and had an art style similar to Metroid Fusion. The prototype did not meet Sakamoto's expectations, so development was halted. Sakamoto said his desire for an intimidating, unsettling antagonist was difficult to achieve with the DS hardware.

=== Later discussion ===
In 2010, Sakamoto said that Nintendo would "start from scratch" if they returned to Dread, and that they were monitoring fan comments for interest in the project. He denied that the Wii game Metroid: Other M (2010) and the Nintendo 3DS game Metroid: Samus Returns (2017) were connected to Dread. In May 2010, IGN's Craig Harris said that the Dread story was complete and that Nintendo could "bring it back at any time".

Critics expressed interest in Metroid Dread or a similar 2D side-scrolling Metroid game. In 2011, IGN cited Dread as a "game in danger". K. Thor Jensen included it in his list of "video games you will never, ever play". He felt that Metroid: Other M was a disappointment and it made him nostalgic for Dread. Thomas East included Dread and its apparent reference in Corruption in their list of "11 amazing Metroid facts and secrets", and said he was hopeful for a 3DS release.

Marc Zablotny, a writer for Official Nintendo Magazine, included Dread in his 2013 wishlist, saying he was more interested in "what it stood for rather than the specific game itself". Zablotny later named it one of the most infamous cancelled Nintendo games. Nick Chester from Destructoid criticized Nintendo for its focus on games such as the Brain Age series over Metroid. In 2015, the researcher Liam Robertson contacted former IGN and Game Informer staff who had encountered the project in the 2000s. He released a video detailing his findings, some of which was corroborated by official sources when the revived Dread was revealed years later.

=== Revival on Nintendo Switch ===
During Nintendo's E3 2021 Nintendo Direct presentation on June 15, Nintendo revealed Metroid Dread for Nintendo Switch, with a release date of October 8, 2021. Dread was developed by the Spanish developer MercurySteam, the studio that developed Metroid: Samus Returns, and Nintendo EPD. Sakamoto said that Nintendo revived the project after seeing what MercurySteam could do with its technology on the Switch. Dread is the first original side-scrolling Metroid game since Fusion. Sakamoto said that the side-scrolling perspective helped create tension, as players can see the E.M.M.I. chasing from a distance.

Sakamoto said he had no set story before MercurySteam became involved, and decided to finish the story arc of Samus and the Metroids. He conceived the E.M.M.I. as a humanoid robot that would hunt Samus on all fours, inspired by ghost stories, saying people were scared by "a human-like form on all fours chasing after them". Its call was based on the oriental turtle dove.

Dread had the codename Project Cazadora ("hunter" in Spanish). Reports after launch described a chaotic work environment, including mismanagement during the COVID-19 pandemic. Nintendo performed an internal review and found that MercurySteam had greatly overscoped for art and cut scenes. This led to significant content cuts twice in 2019, when the number of boss fights was halved, and in 2020, so the team would not enter crunch. MercurySteam's policy of only giving credits to those who collaborated for at minimum 25% of development time meant about 50 people went uncredited.

== Release ==
Metroid Dread was released for the Nintendo Switch on October 8, 2021. The special edition included a 190-page art book, holographic art cards featuring the covers of the five 2D Metroid games, and a steelbook case. Two Amiibo figurines of Samus and E.M.M.I. were released. A sequel, Metroid Ravenous, is scheduled for 2027 for the Nintendo Switch 2.

== Reception ==
Reception

Aggregate scores
Aggregator	Score
Metacritic	88/100
OpenCritic	94% recommend

Review scores
Publication	Score
Destructoid	8.5/10
Eurogamer	Essential
Famitsu	8/10, 8/10, 9/10, 9/10
Game Informer	9/10
GameSpot	8/10
GamesRadar+	3.5/5
IGN	9/10
Nintendo Life	10/10
Nintendo World Report	10/10
PCMag	4.5/5
Retro Gamer	85%
VentureBeat	5/5

On the review aggregator website Metacritic, Metroid Dread has a score of 88 out of 100, indicating "generally favorable" reviews. Samuel Claiborn of IGN praised the boss fights, writing that they "range from the traditional big, drooling monsters with patterns and weak points to learn, to almost Smash Bros.-esque encounters with enemies that mimic your move set". Chris Carter of Destructoid said Dread "masterfully" executed the Metroidvania formula, and that it "doesn't take a lot of big swings, but it rarely bats a foul ball". Nintendo Life's PJ O'Reilly liked the returning mechanics and the newer additions, saying "it always feels as though you've got a ton of choice in how to explore and move around your richly detailed surroundings". Joe Findly of CGMagazine wrote that "Metroid Dread is a wonderful, modern take on a classic game from childhood". IGN wrote that it "brings back the legendary exploration and progression and merges it with excellent modern combat and some of the best boss fights ever".

=== Sales ===
Metroid Dread pre-orders topped the Amazon Video Game Best Sellers list in the US, UK, and Japan. It was also the most pre-ordered game following E3 2021 at GameStop.

Dread had the highest-grossing physical launch of the franchise in the UK, debuting at number three on the weekly video games sales charts. Including digital copies, it became the fastest-selling Metroid game in the UK. In the United States, Dread debuted at #3 and sold 854,000 copies in its first month, making it the fastest-selling Metroid, according to Nintendo of America president Doug Bowser. In Japan, it debuted at number one, selling 86,798 retail copies in its first week of release. Including digital copies, Dread outsold the life-to-date sales of nearly every Metroid game in Japan in its first week. As of December 2022, Dread had sold 3.07 million copies worldwide, making it the highest-selling Metroid game.

=== Awards and accolades ===
At the Game Awards 2021, Metroid Dread won the award for Best Action/Adventure Game. At the Golden Joystick Awards, it won in the category Nintendo Game of the Year. It was also named Game of the Year by Time and Digital Trends.

Year	Award	Category	Result	Ref.
2021
2021	Golden Joystick Awards 2021	Nintendo Game of the Year	Won	
2021	Golden Joystick Awards 2021	Ultimate Game of the Year	Nominated	
2021	The Game Awards 2021	Game of the Year	Nominated	
2021	The Game Awards 2021	Best Action/Adventure Game	Won	
2021	The Game Awards 2021	Players' Voice	Nominated	
2021	Famitsu Dengeki Game Awards	Best Action-Adventure Game	Won	
2022
2022	25th Annual D.I.C.E. Awards	Action Game of the Year	Nominated	
2022	NAVGTR Awards	Control Design, 2D or Limited 3D	Won	
2022	NAVGTR Awards	Control Precision	Won	
2022	NAVGTR Awards	Gameplay Design, Franchise	Won	
2022	NAVGTR Awards	Game, Franchise Action	Nominated	
2022	NAVGTR Awards	Game of the Year	Nominated	
2022	NME Awards	Game of the Year	Won	
2022	18th British Academy Games Awards	EE Game of the Year	Nominated	
2022	Tom's Guide Awards 2022	Best Switch Game	Won	
