= Metroid =

Video game series

- Logo since 2017
- Genres: Action-adventure; Platform; First-person shooter; Pinball
- Developers: Nintendo R&D1 (1986–2004); Intelligent Systems (1986–1994); Retro Studios (2002–present); Fuse Games (2005); Nintendo Software Technology (2006); Team Ninja (2010); Nintendo SPD (2010); Next Level Games (2016, 2025); MercurySteam (2017–present); Nintendo EPD (2017–present)
- Publisher: Nintendo
- Creators: Satoru Okada; Gunpei Yokoi; Hiroji Kiyotake; Yoshio Sakamoto
- Platforms: Famicom Disk System; NES; Game Boy; SNES; Game Boy Advance; GameCube; Nintendo DS; Wii; Nintendo 3DS; Nintendo Switch; Nintendo Switch 2
- First release: Metroid; August 6, 1986
- Latest release: Metroid Prime 4: Beyond; December 4, 2025

Metroid (Note: Japanese: メトロイド, Hepburn: Metoroido) is an action-adventure game franchise created by Nintendo. The player controls the bounty hunter Samus Aran, who protects the galaxy from Space Pirates and their attempts to harness the power of the parasitic Metroid creatures. Metroid combines the platforming of Super Mario Bros. and the exploration of The Legend of Zelda with a science fiction setting and an emphasis on nonlinear gameplay. Metroid games are mostly presented as either side-scrolling or from a first-person perspective. Players battle hostile alien enemies and obtain power-ups as they progress through the game world, with few non-player characters.

The first Metroid was developed by Nintendo R&D1 and released on the Nintendo Entertainment System in 1986. Metroid II: Return of Samus was released for the handheld Game Boy in 1991. Super Metroid (1994), released for the Super Nintendo Entertainment System, drastically expanded the Metroid formula, with numerous new power-ups, an automap and a richer story. After a hiatus, the first 3D Metroid game, Metroid Prime, developed by Retro Studios, was released for the GameCube in 2002 alongside the Game Boy Advance game Metroid Fusion. They were followed by Metroid Prime 2: Echoes (2004) and the Wii game Metroid Prime 3: Corruption (2007).

Metroid: Other M (2010), developed by Team Ninja for the Wii, received weaker reviews. After another hiatus, MercurySteam developed a remake of Metroid II: Return of Samus, Metroid: Samus Returns (2017) for the handheld Nintendo 3DS. It was followed by Metroid Dread (2021) for the Nintendo Switch, the highest-selling Metroid game. Following a protracted development, Metroid Prime 4: Beyond was released for the Nintendo Switch and Nintendo Switch 2 in 2025. Metroid Ravenous, developed by MercurySteam, is scheduled for Switch 2 in 2027.

As of 2012, the Metroid series had sold more than over 17.44 million copies. It has been named among the best game franchises by several publications, and several Metroid games are named among the greatest games. The series has been represented in other Nintendo media, including the Super Smash Bros. series. Additional media includes soundtracks, comic books, and manga. Along with the 1997 Konami game Castlevania: Symphony of the Night, the early Metroid games defined the Metroidvania subgenre, inspiring other games with continuous explorable side-scrolling levels. Samus was one of the first prominent female video game characters.

== Gameplay ==
The Metroid series contains elements from shooter, platformer, adventure, survival and first-person games. The series is notable for its non-linear progression and solitary exploration format where the player only controls Samus Aran, with few or no other characters to interact with. The player gains items and power-ups for Samus's suit through exploration and by defeating enemies. Many upgrades enable further exploration. The Morph Ball upgrade allows Samus to curl into a ball, roll into tight places and plant bombs. The Shinespark ability lets Samus charge her Power Suit with energy and dash at tremendous speeds to break through certain walls. This ability allows access to secret areas and enables sequence breaking, making it important to the Metroid speedrunning community.

The classic series consists of 2D side-scrollers, while the Metroid Prime series uses a first-person perspective, and first-person shooter mechanics. The 2010 game Other M uses the third-person shooter format.

The original Metroid was influenced by two other major Nintendo franchises: Mario, from which it borrowed extensive areas of platform jumping, and The Legend of Zelda, from which it borrowed non-linear exploration. Metroid differed in its atmosphere of solitude and foreboding. Metroid was also one of the first video games to feature an exploration to the left as well as the right, and backtracking to already explored areas to search for secret items and paths. Since the late 1990s, the term "Metroidvania" has been applied to this format. According to Edge, Metroid is "the thinking man's shooter", in which weapons are "more a means of progression than weapon", with the environments posing larger obstacles than enemies.

=== Audio ===
The Metroid series has been noted and praised for its unique style of video game music. Hirokazu "Hip" Tanaka, composer of the original Metroid, has said he wanted to make a score that made players feel like they were encountering a "living creature" and had no distinction between music and sound effects. The only time the main Metroid theme was heard was after Mother Brain is defeated; this is intended to give the player a catharsis. The composer of Super Metroid, Kenji Yamamoto, came up with some themes by humming to himself while riding his motorcycle to work. He was asked to compose the music for Metroid Prime to reinforce the series continuity. Metroid Prime's Dolby Pro Logic II surround sound was mixed by a member of Dolby.

Developers from Retro Studios noted how the 6 MB memory budget for all sound effects of a level in Metroid Prime was crucial in producing a quality soundtrack, as each sound had to be of high quality to be included. Yamamoto used heavy drums, piano, voiced chants, clangs of pipes, and electric guitar. Metroid Prime 3: Corruption took advantage of the increased RAM in the Wii, allowing for higher-quality audio samples. Kenji Yamamoto, who composed the music for Super Metroid and the Prime trilogy, copied the musical design of the original Metroid in Metroid Prime 3, by keeping the music and themes dark and scary until the very end, when uplifting music is played during the credits.

== Story and characters ==
In the first Metroid, Samus explores the planet Zebes to defeat Mother Brain, the leader of the villainous Space Pirates, who plans to harness the power of the Metroids. In Metroid II: The Return of Samus, Samus flies to the Metroids' home planet, SR-388, and exterminates them. After she destroys the Metroid Queen, a baby Metroid hatches and imprints upon her. Samus turns it over to the Galactic Federation for research.

In Super Metroid, Samus chases the Space Pirates to Zebes after the Metroid hatchling is stolen by Ridley. She defeats Space Pirates including Ridley, Kraid, Crocomire and Draygon, but is defeated by Mother Brain. She is saved by the Metroid hatchling, which dies after transferring Mother Brain's power to her. Samus flees Zebes before it explodes.

In Metroid Fusion, Samus is infected by the parasitic virus X, which has multiplied without its natural predator, the Metroids. On board a space station, Samus undergoes surgery to fuse her DNA with the Metroid hatchling, saving her life. After the X virus takes over the space station, Samus confronts the SA-X, a parasite doppelganger.

The first three Metroid Prime games take place between Metroid and Metroid II. In the first, Samus travels to the planet Tallon IV to stop the Space Pirates from exploiting the mutagen Phazon. In Metroid Prime 2: Echoes, Samus battles Space Pirates and mutated Metroids on Aether, a planet split into light and dark dimensions. She also confronts the Ing, half-liquid creatures that can possess the dead, and Dark Samus.

== Development and history ==
Release timeline Main entries in bold
1986	**Metroid**
1987
1988
1989
1990
1991	**Metroid II: Return of Samus**
1992
1993
1994	**Super Metroid**
1995
1996
1997
1998
1999
2000
2001
2002	**Metroid Fusion**
2002	**Metroid Prime**
2003
2004	Metroid: Zero Mission
2004	**Metroid Prime 2: Echoes**
2005	Metroid Prime Pinball
2006	Metroid Prime Hunters
2007	**Metroid Prime 3: Corruption**
2008
2009	Metroid Prime: Trilogy
2010	**Metroid: Other M**
2011
2012
2013
2014
2015
2016	Metroid Prime: Federation Force
2017	Metroid: Samus Returns
2018
2019
2020
2021	**Metroid Dread**
2022
2023	Metroid Prime Remastered
2024
2025	**Metroid Prime 4: Beyond**
2026
2027	**Metroid Ravenous**

=== 1986: Origins ===
In the original Metroid, released in 1986 for the Nintendo Entertainment System, the player controls Samus Aran, who fights aliens on the planet Zebes.

The central figures in the production and development of the Metroid series are Satoru Okada, who directed Metroid (1986) and created the series; Yoshio Sakamoto, who was a character designer for Metroid and has directed or supervised most of the sequels; Gunpei Yokoi, who headed Nintendo Research & Development 1 (R&D1) and produced Metroid and Metroid II: Return of Samus (1991); Makoto Kano, who wrote the story for Metroid, co-designed Metroid II, and produced Super Metroid (1994); and Hiroji Kiyotake, who designed characters for Metroid.

The original Metroid, an action game for the Family Computer Disk System, was developed by R&D1 and released in Japan on August 6, 1986. It was published for the Nintendo Entertainment System (NES) in August 1987 in North America and on January 15, 1988, in Europe. It was designed to be a shooting game that combined the platform jumping of Super Mario Bros. with the non-linear exploration of The Legend of Zelda and a darker aesthetic. The title is a portmanteau of the words "metro" (as in rapid transit) and android, and was meant to allude to the mainly underground setting of the first game as well as its robot-like protagonist. Halfway through development, a member of staff suggested making Samus a woman as a twist. Ridley Scott's 1979 science-fiction horror film Alien was described by Sakamoto as a "huge influence" after the world of the first Metroid had been created. In recognition of this, an antagonist was given the name Ridley. The staff were also influenced by the work of the film's creature designer H. R. Giger, finding his style fit the Metroid universe.

=== 1991–2002: Sequels and first hiatus ===
Metroid II: Return of Samus was released for the handheld Game Boy console in 1991 in North America and in 1992 in Japan and Europe. It further established Samus Aran's visual design, with the bulky Varia Suit upgrade and different arm cannons.

As R&D1 were committed to making another game, Nintendo brought in Intelligent Systems to develop Super Metroid for the 16-bit Super Nintendo Entertainment System (SNES). Development began in late 1991. Released in 1994, Super Metroid drastically expanded the Metroid formula, with numerous new power-ups and a richer story. It received acclaim and is considered one of the best SNES games. It was directed by Yoshio Sakamoto, the character designer for the first Metroid; Sakamoto has directed or produced most of the 2D Metroid games since.

After Super Metroid, no new Metroid games were released for eight years. Nintendo could not generate firm ideas for a Metroid for their new console, the Nintendo 64. Sakamoto said he could not imagine how the Nintendo 64 controller could be used to move Samus. An unidentified company declined an offer from Nintendo to develop a Metroid game for the Nintendo 64, as they were not confident they could create a successor to Super Metroid. The Virtual Boy game Galactic Pinball (1995) featured a segment in which the player controls Samus' gunship, and Samus was a playable character in the Nintendo 64 fighting game Super Smash Bros. (1999).

=== 2002–2009: Fusion and Prime ===
Metroid Prime, released in 2002 for the GameCube, introduced 3D graphics and first-person shooter gameplay.

In 2000, the Nintendo producer Shigeru Miyamoto visited the new Nintendo subsidiary Retro Studios in Austin, Texas. He did not like any of the projects they had in development, but spent time playing Action Adventure, a third-person science-fiction action game with a female protagonist. Miyamoto tasked Retro with developing a Metroid game for the new Nintendo console, the GameCube. The team terminated Action Adventure and moved to Metroid.

Metroid Prime (2002), the first 3D Metroid game, moved the nonlinear structure of Super Metroid to a first-person perspective. Nintendo stressed that it was not a first-person shooter but a "first-person adventure". Metroid Prime received acclaim. It sold 2.84 million copies worldwide and was the best-selling Metroid game until Metroid Dread (2021).

Nintendo released Metroid Fusion, a 2D game for the Game Boy Advance (GBA), released on the same day as Prime in North America. It was developed by R&D1 and written and directed by Sakamoto. Its gameplay is similar to Super Metroid, but with a more mission-based structure that gives more guidance to the player. The team's next GBA project was Zero Mission (2004), a remake of the original Metroid. Both GBA games received acclaim. A Nintendo restructure merged R&D1 with R&D2 in 2003, shortly ahead of the release of Zero Mission.

In 2004, Nintendo released Metroid Prime 2: Echoes for GameCube, which has Samus switching between parallel light and dark worlds and introduced greater difficulty. In 2005, Nintendo released Metroid Prime Pinball, a pinball spin-off for the DS developed by Fuse Games. Metroid Prime Hunters, a multiplayer game developed by Nintendo Software Technology, was released for the DS in 2006. Metroid Prime 3: Corruption, released for the Wii in 2007, added motion controls and has Samus exploring separate planets. By the late 2000s, Nintendo was focusing more on casual gamers; with its backtracking and complex gameplay, Metroid was incompatible with this strategy and Metroid Prime 3 received minimal marketing.

The Prime games were rereleased for the Wii in the compilation Metroid Prime: Trilogy. Trilogy was only available in limited quantities as Nintendo ceased production of the discs in January 2010—only months after launch, and instead suggested users seek out second-hand copies. In the late 2000s, Next Level Games built a Metroid prototype for the upcoming Nintendo 3DS handheld as a pitch to Nintendo in the late 2000s, but it was not picked up. Instead, Next Level developed Luigi's Mansion: Dark Moon.

=== 2010–2016: Other M, second hiatus, and Prime: Federation Force ===
With Nintendo focusing on a more casual audience during the Wii's lifespan, the next Metroid moved away from the more complex gameplay of the Prime series. Metroid: Other M was developed with the Japanese studio Team Ninja and directed by Sakamoto. He pursued a simpler control scheme, hoping it to be as simple as a NES game. It was released for Wii in 2010. It featured a third-person perspective and placed a greater focus on story and action. Other M received weaker reviews, with criticism for its characterization of Samus as timid and emotional and its reduced emphasis on exploration. Polygon described Other M as "such a massive misfire and a flop with fans that it practically killed the series". Joystiq noted that even with the revised approach the game was "anathema" to the casual focus of Nintendo in that era, as Nintendo was simply no longer making games of that type. There was no major Metroid game for seven years.

A Metroid minigame, "Metroid Blast", appeared in the Wii U game Nintendo Land (2012), which had a mixed reception. Using the Wii U GamePad, the player controls Samus's gunship, while up to four players with Wii Remotes and Nunchuks control Mii characters on foot, wearing Varia Suits. Miyamoto said this reflected his ideas for future Metroid games. In 2016, Nintendo released Metroid Prime: Federation Force, developed by Next Level. It received criticism for its multiplayer focus, soccer minigame and frivolous tone. After it was unveiled at E3 2015, an online fan petition to have it cancelled drew thousands of signatures. Federation Force was absent from Nintendo's presence at E3 2016 months before launch. It was a commercial failure.

=== 2017–present: Prime 4: Beyond and MercurySteam games ===
Metroid: Samus Returns, released in 2017 for the Nintendo 3DS

In the mid-2010s, the Spanish studio MercurySteam proposed remaking Fusion. Sakamoto was impressed by their work on Castlevania: Lords of Shadow – Mirror of Fate (2013) and instead asked them to remake Metroid II. Metroid: Samus Returns (2017) retains the side-scrolling gameplay of the original and adds 3D graphics and a melee counterattack, suggested by MercurySteam after their use of a similar mechanic in Castlevania. The first major Metroid game in seven years and the first sidescrolling Metroid game in 13 years, it received positive reviews.

MercurySteam's next project was Metroid Dread for the Nintendo Switch (2021), a realization of a cancelled Nintendo DS project. It had sold more than 2.9 million copies worldwide by May 2022, making it the best-selling Metroid game. In February 2023, Nintendo released Metroid Prime Remastered, a high-definition remaster of Metroid Prime for the Switch. It was developed by Retro Studios with assistance from developers including Iron Galaxy Studios.

Nintendo announced Metroid Prime 4: Beyond for the Switch at E3 2017. It was initially developed by Bandai Namco Studios, but Nintendo restarted development under Retro after it was unsatisfied with progress. Beyond was released on December 4, 2025 for Switch and Switch 2 and received generally positive reviews. It adds psychic abilities, used to control beam shots and manipulate objects, and a hub world, which Samus crosses with a motorcycle, the Vi-O-La. The next side-scrolling game, Metroid Ravenous, was announced in September 2026 and is scheduled for release on Switch 2 on January 28, 2027.

== Reception ==
Sales and aggregate review scores
Game	Units sold	GameRankings	Metacritic
Metroid	NES: 2.73 million; GBA: < 1.00 million; GBA (Zero Mission): < 1.00 million	NES: —; GBA: 62%; GBA (Zero Mission): 90%	NES: —; GBA: 58; GBA (Zero Mission): 89
Metroid II: Return of Samus	GB: 1.72 million; 3DS (Samus Returns): < 1.00 million	GB: 79%; 3DS (Samus Returns): 87%	GB: —; 3DS (Samus Returns): 85
Super Metroid	1.42 million	96%	—
Metroid Fusion	1.39 million	91%	92
Metroid Prime	GCN: 2.84 million; NS: 1.09 million	GCN: 96%; NS: —	GCN: 97; NS: 94
Metroid Prime 2: Echoes	1.10 million	92%	92
Metroid Prime Pinball	< 1.00 million	80%	79
Metroid Prime Hunters	1.08 million	84%	85
Metroid Prime 3: Corruption	1.41 million	90%	90
Metroid Prime: Trilogy	< 1.00 million	92%	91
Metroid: Other M	< 1.00 million	79%	79
Metroid Prime: Federation Force	< 1.00 million	65%	64
Metroid Dread	3.07 million	—	88
Metroid Prime 4: Beyond	> 1.00 million (Switch & Switch 2 combined)	—	78

Metroid was ranked the 70th top game (collectively) by Next Generation in 1996 and the 6th in 1999, and as the eighth-best game franchise by IGN in 2008. In 2001, Electronic Gaming Monthly named Super Metroid the best game ever. All the Metroid games released by 2005 were included in a Nintendo Power top 200 Nintendo games list, Prime in the IGN top 100, Metroid, Super Metroid, Prime and Echoes in a list by GameFAQs users; Metroid and Super Metroid in Game Informer's list; and Prime and Super Metroid in Edge's list. The series has influenced games including Castlevania: Symphony of the Night.

Samus Aran was recognized by Guinness World Records as "enduringly popular" and as the "first playable human female character in a mainstream video game", although Toby Masuyo ("Kissy") from Namco's Alien Sector predates her by one year. Ridley was the second-most requested Nintendo character by IGN and number one by the fans to be added as a playable character to the Super Smash Bros. series and Mother Brain is often named among the best video game bosses.

The original Metroid has been described as boosted by its "eerie" music, adding a "sense of mystery and exploration" to the game by making the game "moody and atmospheric". IGN praised the well-timed music that helped add suspense. GameSpot described Super Metroid as better than the original "in literally every conceivable way", Metroid Fusion was noted for its "understated score" which fit the mood of the adventure and its excellent stereo sound effects, making it an uncommonly good Game Boy Advance sound experience. Metroid Prime won multiple Game of the Year awards. IGN called the aural experience with Metroid Prime 2: Echoes "mesmerizing". Music from Metroid has been frequently re-released as part of "best of" video game music releases. Metroid Prime's soundtrack was called the best sound design on the GameCube. The sound effects were also noted for a high degree of accuracy and blending with the soundtrack.

=== Sales ===
Each Metroid game, excluding spin-offs and remakes, has sold more than one million copies. By September 2012, the series had sold over 17.44 million copies worldwide. Metroid sales in Japan have typically been lower than in the United States. In its debut week in Japan, Metroid Prime 3: Corruption sold 32,388 copies, ranking it behind Ryū ga Gotoku Kenzan!, Super Smash Bros. Brawl, Wii Fit, and Gundam Musou Special. Metroid: Other M was the third-bestselling video game in Japan during its week of release with 45,398 copies sold, ranking it behind Wii Party and Monster Hunter Diary: Poka Poka Airu Village. It sold an additional 11,239 copies the following week.

== Legacy ==
Along with the 1997 Konami game Castlevania: Symphony of the Night, the early Metroid games defined a subgenre known as Metroidvania. Tom Happ, developer of the 2015 Metroidvania game Axiom Verge, defined Metroidvania games as side-scrolling adventures with continuous maps, rather than discrete levels, that require the player to collect items and backtrack. Other notable Metroidvania games include Cave Story (2004), Shadow Complex (2009), Ori and the Blind Forest (2015), Hollow Knight (2017), and Chasm (2018). Metroid is therefore among a handful of game series to have genres named after them, along with Dark Souls (Soulslike) and Rogue (Roguelike).

In 2016, AM2R, a fan-made remake of Metroid II was released. Nintendo issued takedown notices to halt its distribution, citing the potential damage to its intellectual property. AM2R was nominated for the Game Awards 2016, but was removed as it had not been cleared by Nintendo for inclusion.

=== Crossovers ===
==== Super Smash Bros. franchise ====
Samus is a playable character in all five Super Smash Bros. games. Games from Super Smash Bros. Brawl onward also feature Zero Suit Samus, a version of the heroine using the blue form-fitting suit seen in Zero Mission and the Prime series. Ridley makes cameos in Super Smash Bros., where he can be seen flying through the level Zebes, and in Super Smash Bros. Melee both as an unlockable trophy and in the game's opening, where he is fighting Samus at Ceres Space Station. In Super Smash Bros. Brawl, Ridley appears as a boss character in both normal and Meta Ridley forms. Ridley's clone from Metroid: Other M appears as a boss on the Pyroshpere stage in Super Smash Bros. for Wii U, where he will join a fighter's side if they manage to knock him out. Due to demand from fans, Ridley was made a playable fighter in Super Smash Bros. Ultimate. Kraid also appeared in Super Smash Bros. Melee as a stage hazard in Brinstar Depths and unlockable trophy. Various other characters such as Metroids, Mother Brain and Dark Samus appear as either trophies or stickers in the Super Smash Bros. series as well. Dark Samus would later debut as a fighter in Super Smash Bros. Ultimate, sharing a moveset similar to Samus. A number of locations from the Metroid franchise have appeared in Super Smash Bros. games as battle stages.

==== Other games ====
Samus has appeared in other Nintendo games such as Super Mario RPG, the NES version of Tetris, Tetris DS, Galactic Pinball, Kirby Super Star, Kirby's Dream Land 3 and WarioWare.

A Metroid-lookalike enemy, called the Komayto, appears in Kid Icarus for the NES; the characters allude to the similarities between the two in Kid Icarus: Uprising. In Dead or Alive: Dimensions, a fighting game developed by Team Ninja for the 3DS, one stage is a replica of the arena in which Samus fights Ridley in Metroid: Other M and features both as non-playable characters. When asked why Samus is not playable in Dimensions, Team Ninja's Yosuke Hayashi said in an interview that "it would be better to let her focus on her job rather than kicking everyone's butt in [Dead or Alive: Dimensions]". The Wii U launch game Nintendo Land has a minigame based on the series called "Metroid Blast". A Samus amiibo figure can be used to unlock a Mii costume based on her appearance in Mario Kart 8 and a Samus costume in Super Mario Maker.

In 2020, Nintendo and Epic Games began negotiations to include Samus in Fortnite as a skin. The plans came to light when internal Epic documents were released as part of the Epic Games v. Apple case in 2021. Other characters from the batch in the document such as Kratos and Master Chief were added to the game in late 2020, but Samus was not. In 2024, former Epic creative director Donald Mustard revealed that Nintendo had requested Nintendo Switch exclusivity for the Samus skin, which was against Epic's policy of maintaining feature parity for Fortnite across all platforms, and so the character was never included.

=== In other media ===
==== Television ====
A Metroid animated series was considered for the Super Mario Bros. Power Hour, a cancelled animation block that would have aired in the 1980s. Concept art was produced for the series, which notably featured a male incarnation of Samus. Power Hour never moved forward in the intended format, instead being replaced by The Super Mario Bros. Super Show! which aired in 1989. Mother Brain was the primary villain in the Captain N: The Game Master TV show.

==== Manga ====
Comics and manga based on Metroid, Super Metroid, Prime, Echoes and Zero Mission have been published in the US and Japan. Samus and other Metroid characters featured in the Captain N: The Game Master comic books by Valiant Comics. In Japan, a Metroid manga series was published in Kodansha's Monthly Magazine Z beginning in November 2003, and ran for 16 chapters, which were later collected into two Tankōbon volumes. Also in Japan, Comic Bom Bom published a three-volume manga starring Samus, Metroid: Samus and Joey. (Note: メトロイド サムス&ジョイ, Metoroido Samusu& joi)

==== Proposed film ====
In 2003, two producers optioned the rights to create a live-action film based on Metroid, but the rights expired. The director John Woo acquired the rights a few years later, and his studio Lion Rock Productions was to produce and release the film before 2006. The writers included David Greenwalt, who had worked on Buffy the Vampire Slayer, Angel, and Grimm. The producer, Brad Froxhoven, said the film would have explored Samus' origin story, depicting her as an "exceptionally talented" but "flawed" character seeking redemption, and would have been faithful to the games.

According to Foxhoven, Nintendo was protective due to the failure of the 1993 Super Mario Bros. film. Nintendo had no answers to the team's questions about Samus' personal life, relationships, and other personal characteristics, and was uncomfortable with the film team "being the ones to propose those answers". Foxhoven said Nintendo left the discussions appreciating that they needed to develop the franchise further if it were to become a Hollywood film. In 2013, Sakamoto said he could support a film directed by Ryuji Kitaura, the director of the CG scenes in Other M, if the concept and methodologies were good enough.
