= Samus Aran =

Video game character

- Metroid character
- Samus Aran in her Varia Suit, as she appears in Metroid Prime Remastered
- First game: Metroid (1986)
- Created by: Makoto Kano
- Designed by: Hiroji Kiyotake
- Voiced by: Various: Super Metroid; Minako Hamano (death scream); Keiko Toda (promotional reel); Metroid Prime series; Jennifer Hale (1-3); Vanessa Marshall (1-3, death scream); Erin Yvette (4); Super Smash Bros. series; Alésia Glidewell (Zero Suit Samus); Metroid: Other M; Jessica Martin (English); Ai Kobayashi (Japanese); Metroid Dread; Nikki García (dialogue); Holly Renaut (scream)
- Portrayed by: Chisato Morishita (Metroid: Zero Mission commercial); Melanie Peyton-Smith (Metroid Prime and Metroid Fusion commercials)

In-universe information
- Species: Metroid and Chozo-infused human
- Gender: Female

Samus Aran (Japanese: サムス・アラン, Hepburn: Samusu Aran) is the protagonist of the video game series Metroid by Nintendo. She was created by the Japanese video game designer Makoto Kano and introduced in the first Metroid (1986) for the Nintendo Entertainment System.

Raised by the birdlike Chozo and infused with their DNA, Samus is an ex-soldier of the Galactic Federation who became a galactic bounty hunter. She uses a powered exoskeleton that is equipped with an arm cannon that fires directed-energy weapons and missiles. She executes missions given to her by the Galactic Federation and the Chozo, and is tasked with hunting various antagonistic forces, including the Space Pirates and their leader Ridley, the cybernetic supercomputer Mother Brain, the energy-draining X Parasites and Metroids, and the rogue Chozo warrior Raven Beak.

Samus also appears as a playable character in the Super Smash Bros. series. She features in other media, including films, manga series, and the comic book continuation of the television series Captain N: The Game Master. As one of the earliest female video game protagonists, Samus is noted for her role in establishing positive gender representation in video games.

== Concept ==
Samus Aran was conceived by the designer Makoto Kano and designed by Hiroji Kiyotake. She first appeared in the first Metroid game, Metroid (1986), for the Nintendo Entertainment System (NES). The Metroid co-creator Yoshio Sakamoto said an unknown member of the development team suggested making Samus a woman midway through development, which the team voted in favor of. The instruction manual refers to Samus as male to obscure her gender until the surprise reveal at the end of the game.

Samus's appearance outside of her suit was based on Sigourney Weaver as Ellen Ripley from Aliens, and Kim Basinger in her roles in 9½ Weeks and My Stepmother Is an Alien. Sakamoto said the developers try to express her femininity without sexually objectifying her. The name "Aran" was taken from Edson Arantes do Nascimento, the birth name of the Brazilian football player Pelé.

In most games, Samus is a silent protagonist. She does not speak in the original Metroid. In Super Metroid, she only speaks in the prologue. Samus has more dialogue in Fusion and Other M. Sakamoto said Samus has little dialogue in Metroid Dread (2021) because he wanted to convey the narrative through acting and visuals.

Though Samus has been described as a bounty hunter since the original Metroid, the Japanese Nintendo staff had a different understanding of the term. During the development of Metroid Prime 3: Corruption (2007), the American studio Retro Studios planned to have Samus embark on missions to collect bounties, which Nintendo opposed, saying she was driven by altruism rather than profit. Eventually, Retro discovered that the Japanese staff imagined bounty hunters as selfless heroes rather than mercenaries who capture fugitives for money. Mike Wikan, a designer at Retro, described Samus as "Boba Fett with a sense of honor".

=== Design ===
Fan art illustration of the Power Suit's Morph Ball form. Collapsing into a ball to navigate tight spaces is Samus' signature ability.

Samus wears the Power Suit, a powered exoskeleton that protects her from danger and can be enhanced by power-ups collected during gameplay. With the Power Suit's Arm Cannon, Samus can fire various energy beams, charge beams to shoot an extra-powerful blast, or launch a limited number of missiles. The Power Suit can be reconfigured into a small, spherical form called the Morph Ball, which allows her to roll through tight areas, such as tunnels, and use Bombs. Additionally, its visor can be used to scan objects to learn more about them, a feature that has been used since Metroid Prime. Aside from her Power Suit, Samus is also in possession of a Gunship, which is used in the games to save progress and restore her health and ammunition.

Early on, instances of Samus appearing without the Power Suit occur mainly in cutscenes, such as post-game screenshots of her in more revealing clothing, which are unlocked depending on difficulty level, game completion, or play time. Players could control Samus without her suit in the original Metroid using a passcode. Metroid: Zero Mission introduced the Zero Suit, a form-fitting jumpsuit that she wears beneath the Power Suit. In Metroid: Other M, the Zero Suit is capable of materializing the Power Suit from within itself.

Samus's signature ability to collapse into a ball to travel through tight areas was initially called the Maru Mari, meaning "round ball" in Japanese, and was rechristened as the Morphing Ball in Super Metroid, and as the Morph Ball beginning in Metroid Fusion. The Morph Ball was conceived by the developers because it requires less effort to animate than "a cyborg crawling on all fours", and the producer for Metroid, Gunpei Yokoi, took advantage of this shortcut. In Metroid Prime 4: Beyond, Samus gains telekinetic abilities.

The Super Metroid Nintendo's Player's Guide describes Samus as 6 feet 3 inches (1.91 m) tall and weighs 198 pounds (90 kg) without her Power Suit. The official Return of Samus website lists a height and weight of 190 cm and 90 kg under a Power Suit diagram titled "Samus Aran", while in a official Japanese guidebook for Super Metroid, co-director Hiroyuki Kimura stated her measurements were 106-60-90 cm (42-24-35 in). Her height varies from game to game, with some media depicting her height as the same as her suit while in others such as Other M she is significantly shorter.

== Appearances ==
Samus was raised on the mining colony K-2L, and when she was a child, the planet was raided by Space Pirates led by Ridley in an attack that killed her parents and destroyed the colony. The orphaned Samus was then found by a bird-like alien race known as the Chozo, who brought her to their home planet, Zebes. To keep her alive, they infused her with their DNA, granting her superhuman athleticism and a strong resistance to foreign environments. After training her and granting her one of their artifacts, the Power Suit, Samus leaves and enlists in the Galactic Federation. She leaves after a dispute with her commanding officer, Adam Malkovich, but continues to assist them as a freelance bounty hunter afterward.

=== In Metroid ===
Samus first appeared in Metroid in 1986. The Galactic Federation sends Samus to track down the Space Pirates on their home planet of Zebes. Deep within their base, she battles Mother Brain, and escapes just as the base self-destructs. She appears again in Metroid II: Return of Samus, where she is tasked with exterminating the Metroid species on SR388. After defeating the Metroid Queen, she finds a lone baby Metroid that imprints on her, and she spares its life. This story is retold in the remake, Metroid: Samus Returns. Her nemesis Ridley steals the hatchling in Super Metroid, who Samus pursues through Zebes. She finds the baby Metroid fully grown, who sacrifices its life siphoning the energy from a reborn Mother Brain, transferring it to Samus. She defeats Mother Brain and escapes the planet before it explodes.

Metroid: Other M expands Samus's backstory and emotional scope, such as her brief motherly connection to the Metroid hatchling; the deep respect for her former commanding officer and father figure Adam Malkovich; her reignited feud with Mother Brain in the form of the android MB; and overcoming a posttraumatic episode upon encountering a clone of her arch-nemesis Ridley.

She later appears in Metroid Fusion, where she becomes infected by the X Parasite but is saved by DNA made from the hatchling. She explores a Space Station infected by the parasite and seeks to prevent it from spreading. She discovers Metroids are being grown here, and destroys the space station to destroy both the X and the Metroid.

In Metroid Dread, the Galactic Federation receives a video from an unknown source showing an X Parasite alive in the wild on planet ZDR. To investigate, they send 7 E.M.M.I. (Extraplanetary Multiform Mobile Identifier) units, but after losing contact with the units, they hire Samus once again as she is the only being in the universe immune to the X. Upon arriving on ZDR, Samus is attacked, left unconscious and stripped of her equipment by an unknown Chozo warrior. From there she travels through the planet to reach her ship on the surface, having to contend with the near invincible E.M.M.I. and other threats on the way.

=== In Metroid Prime ===
Samus also appears in the Metroid Prime series, starting with Metroid Prime. She explores the planet Tallon IV, which contains a Chozo colony in ruins and a Space Pirate base. There she learns of Phazon, a mysterious mutagen that can alter the genetic material of any organism. Samus is eventually able to access the source of the planet's Phazon contamination, a meteor impact crater, where she defeats the Phazon-infused creature Metroid Prime. In one ending, the Metroid Prime is shown reforming as a copy of Samus, dubbed in Metroid Prime 2: Echoes as Dark Samus. In Echoes, Samus is sent to the planet Aether, a Phazon meteor-ravaged planet split into light and dark dimensions. There she battles the Ing, creatures that are able to possess other organisms, and Dark Samus. In Metroid Prime 3: Corruption (2007), Dark Samus infects Samus with Phazon, which slowly corrupts her and further forces her to prevent it from spreading to other planets. By the end of the game, she renders all Phazon inert by destroying its original source, the planet Phaaze, and permanently destroys Dark Samus.

Samus also appears in other Metroid Prime games, including Metroid Prime Pinball, a pinball version of the first Metroid Prime game. She also appears in Metroid Prime Hunters, where she is tasked with either retrieving or destroying an "ultimate power" while dealing with other bounty hunters. Metroid Prime Federation Force has her as a non-playable character, where she needs to be rescued from the Space Pirates by Galactic Federation soldiers.

=== In other video games ===
Samus Aran wearing the Zero Suit, as depicted in promotional artwork for Super Smash Bros. Ultimate

Outside of the Metroid series, Samus appears as a playable character throughout the Super Smash Bros. series, where she can use her array of weapons in combat against characters from other Nintendo franchises. She first appears in Super Smash Bros. on the Nintendo 64 in her Power Suit. In Super Smash Bros. Brawl, the third entry in the series, Zero Suit Samus was added as an alternate form of Samus, with completely different outfit and moveset. Both forms appear as distinct characters in every Smash game afterward. Super Smash Bros. Ultimate added Dark Samus, whose moveset and model are mostly the same aside from animations and design.

Samus makes cameo appearances in the games Galactic Pinball (1995), Super Mario RPG (1996), Kirby Super Star (1996), Kirby's Dream Land 3 (1997), and Dead or Alive: Dimensions by the Metroid: Other M developer Team Ninja.

=== In other media ===
Samus is featured in a series of comic books called Captain N: The Game Master, published by Valiant Comics in 1990, based on the animated series of the same name. In the comic series, set before the events of Metroid, Samus is portrayed as brash, money-hungry, and fiercely independent, and title character Kevin Keene is depicted as her love interest. Samus also appears in various print adaptation of Metroid games.

Samus appears as the main character of the 2003–2004 manga series Metroid, telling her backstory up to the events of Metroid. Adapting Samus' soldier background as previously provided in Captain N: The Game Master, the series was written by Kouji Tazawa and illustrated by Kenji Ishikawa. Samus is featured as a mentor character in the manga series Samus and Joey and its sequel series Metroid EX. Famous across the universe as the "Guardian of the Galaxy", Samus trains a young boy, frontier planeteer Joey Apronika, as her successor. In the 2015 short fan film Metroid: The Sky Calls, Samus is portrayed by Jessica Chobot and America Young.

An animated series was explored in the late 1980s as part of Super Mario Bros. Power Hour. Some concept art was produced by DIC at the time, which included a male incarnation of Samus. The Metroid series was however never produced; only the Zelda and Mario segments moved ahead.

== Promotion and reception ==
Samus Aran has been widely considered a breakthrough for female characters in video games, and is one of the most beloved video game characters of all time by critics and fans alike. Samus is one of the first major female protagonists in a video game. The reveal in the original game has been regarded as a significant moment in gaming by sources such as UGO Networks, Game Informer, and GameDaily. In contrast, Rupert Goodwins of The Independent felt that the ambiguity of who might be in the suit made it "hardly a breakthrough for feminism". Various critics have discussed Samus' relation to sexuality; she was regarded as being one of the least sexualized female video game characters in the 2007 book Gaming Lives in the Twenty-First Century: Literate Connections, a belief shared by Steve Rabin in "Introduction to Game Development". Justin Hoeger of The Sacramento Bee appreciated that she was not a character who existed for sex appeal, as well as her "tough" personality. A writer for the Toronto Star however, felt distaste for the "sexual politics" surrounding Samus, feeling that she was neither a character created for sex appeal, but was also not a "leader in the struggle for video game civil rights". Featuring her in their 2004 list of "top ten forces of good" (one section on their list of top 50 "retro" game characters), Retro Gamer regarded her as a "distinct female character [who does not rely] on cheap thrills to capture the attention of gamers". Nevertheless, much of Samus' media reception came from her sex appeal, and she has been included in many video-game lists that rank women by their physical attractiveness.

Figures based on the character have been produced by various manufacturers. Samus is one of the twelve original amiibo released in November 2014. Nintendo Life suggested that Samus is a mascot for the Metroidvania genre.

Paul O'Connor, the lead game designer for Sammy Studios and a fan of the Metroid series, remarked that players empathize and identify with Samus because she is often rewarded for indulging in her curiosity. The book Videogames and Art noted that in the original Metroid the player is not briefed on Samus's past or future; the only interaction that they have with the character is by being her through gameplay, while bits of information can be gleaned from the handbook and through concept art, adding, "Samus is very rare for the character intimacy gained solely through game play and for her stasis and then drastic change", referring to the revelation that she is a woman.

Samus's portrayal in Metroid: Other M received mixed reactions. Unlike other Metroid games, where Samus takes full advantage of weapons and abilities available, she deactivates most of them until Commander Adam Malkovich authorized their use. G4 considered Samus needing permission to use her equipment and Samus' anxiety attack upon seeing Ridley sexist. According to GamePro, though Other M's story and Samus's monologues did not compel them, "it helped contextualize her entire existence" which developed the character to "an actual human being who's using the vastness of space to try and put some distance between herself and the past". 1UP.com's Justin Hayward found the portrayal "lifeless and boring" and "nonsensical". GamesRadar wrote that Other M painted Samus, widely considered a strong female character, as "an unsure, insecure woman who desperately wants the approval of her former [male] commanding officer". The A.V. Club echoed the misgivings about her immaturity, petulant behavior, and misguided loyalty. In Metroid Dread, several critics noted that Samus is a silent protagonist. Alex Donaldson of VG247 has said the game proves that Samus is cooler than the Halo protagonist, Master Chief, but Ian Walker of Kotaku criticized this and said that "Samus doesn't need to be an emotionless robot to be badass".

In his review of Super Smash Bros., GameSpot's Jeff Gerstmann called Samus one of the characters that made Nintendo "what it is today". IGN named her the third-best character for Super Smash Bros. Where Jeremy Parish of Polygon felt her Zero Suit "works as demonstration of the questionable design decisions" for female characters in the Smash series, he regards Samus as "by far the toughest lady in Nintendo's stable of characters". Gavin Jasper of Den of Geek felt that Samus stood out among the cast due to concept, design, and backstory. He also appreciated Zero Suit Samus appearing in the game as a nod to the first Metroid game.

In an article in 2015, video-game developer Brianna Wu opined that Samus was a trans woman, noting that Hirofumi Matsuoka, who worked on Samus' original design, stated she was not a woman, but rather a "newhalf". Both Wu and others acknowledged it is possible to interpret this brief description as sarcasm, or a genuine indication that Samus is transgender. Wu's article sparked debate. While stating he believed people should interpret Samus as transgender if they prefer, journalist Erik Kain argued that Wu's reliance on Matsuoka's "authorial intent" for her argument was flawed. In a 2023 article including Samus on a list of the top transgender video game characters, Eva Reign from Autostraddle commented that people arguing against the possibility of Samus being transgender were basing their decisions "off physical characteristics which feels pretty transphobic".

== See also ==
- Gender representation in video games
- List of female action heroes and villains
- Women warriors in literature and culture
