= List of Metroid media =

Packaging for all Metroid games released prior to Metroid Prime 3: Corruption.

Metroid is a video game series published by Nintendo and primarily produced by the company's first-party developers, though second-party Fuse Games and third-party Team Ninja have also developed for the series. It debuted in Japan with Metroid (Note: Japanese: メトロイド, Hepburn: Metoroido) on August 6, 1986, and was later released in North America (August 1987) and PAL regions (January 15, 1988). All Metroid video games have been developed exclusively for Nintendo video game consoles and handhelds, dating from the Nintendo Entertainment System to the current generation of video game consoles. The franchise consists of eleven video games, the latest of which was released in 2021. Comics, manga adaptations, and soundtracks have also been released.

The series revolves around Samus Aran, a bounty hunter who protects the galaxy from the Space Pirates and their attempts to harness the power of fictional organisms, especially the eponymous Metroids. The series' gameplay contains elements from shooter, platforming, and adventure games. It is known for its non-linear progression and solitary exploration. The 2D Metroid games are side-scrollers, and the 3D Metroid Prime series gives the player a first-person perspective, while Other M is a third-person shooter with the ability to switch to first-person view. Metroid is one of Nintendo's most successful franchises, with over 17 million copies sold by September 2012. The games have received varying levels of critical acclaim.

== Video games ==
=== Metroid series ===
Game	Details
Metroid Original release date(s): JP: August 6, 1986; NA: August 15, 1987; PAL: January 15, 1988	Release years by system: 1986 – Famicom Disk System; 1987 – Nintendo Entertainment System; 1987 – PlayChoice-10; 2004 – Game Boy Advance; 2007 – Wii Virtual Console; 2012 – 3DS Virtual Console; 2016 – NES Classic Edition; 2018 – Nintendo Classics
Metroid Original release date(s): JP: August 6, 1986; NA: August 15, 1987; PAL: January 15, 1988	Notes: First Metroid game.; Released in Japan for the Famicom Disk System, with a three-slot save system; internationally released as a Nintendo Entertainment System cartridge with a password system to continue progress.; Remade for the Game Boy Advance as Metroid: Zero Mission.; Also an unlockable game by connecting Metroid Fusion to Metroid Prime using the Nintendo GameCube Game Boy Advance Cable, or finishing Metroid: Zero Mission.; Re-released for the Game Boy Advance as part of the Classic NES Series in 2004 (US), and as one of the included games on the NES Classic Edition.
Metroid II: Return of Samus Original release date(s): NA: November 1991; JP: January 21, 1992; PAL: May 21, 1992	Release years by system: 1991 – Game Boy; 2011 – 3DS Virtual Console; 2023 – Nintendo Classics
Metroid II: Return of Samus Original release date(s): NA: November 1991; JP: January 21, 1992; PAL: May 21, 1992	Notes: First handheld Metroid title.; A special color palette used for the game was added to the Game Boy Color hardware.; Nintendo considered a remake for the Game Boy Advance.; Remade for the 3DS as Metroid: Samus Returns.
Super Metroid Original release date(s): JP: March 19, 1994; NA: April 18, 1994; PAL: July 28, 1994	Release years by system: 1994 – Super Nintendo Entertainment System; 2007 – Wii Virtual Console; 2013 – Wii U Virtual Console; 2016 – 3DS Virtual Console (New Nintendo 3DS model only); 2017 – Super NES Classic Edition; 2019 – Nintendo Classics
Super Metroid Original release date(s): JP: March 19, 1994; NA: April 18, 1994; PAL: July 28, 1994	Notes: Re-released for download over the Nintendo Power system in Japan.; Also a trial game available in Super Smash Bros. Brawl, which uses Virtual Console technology to emulate older hardware and have time constraints.
Metroid Fusion Original release date(s): NA: November 18, 2002; EU: November 22, 2002; AU: November 29, 2002; JP: February 14, 2003	Release years by system: 2002 – Game Boy Advance; 2011 – 3DS Virtual Console; 2014 – Wii U Virtual Console; 2023 – Nintendo Classics
Metroid Fusion Original release date(s): NA: November 18, 2002; EU: November 22, 2002; AU: November 29, 2002; JP: February 14, 2003	Notes: Japanese version had adjustable difficulty levels, while international versions featured a single difficulty.; Released simultaneously with Metroid Prime in North America.
Metroid: Zero Mission Original release date(s): NA: February 9, 2004; AU: March 19, 2004; EU: April 8, 2004; JP: May 27, 2004	Release years by system: 2004 – Game Boy Advance; 2024 – Nintendo Classics
Metroid: Zero Mission Original release date(s): NA: February 9, 2004; AU: March 19, 2004; EU: April 8, 2004; JP: May 27, 2004	Notes: Remake of Metroid, with improved graphics, new gameplay features and additional content.; Includes the original game as an unlockable extra.
Metroid: Other M Original release date(s): NA: August 31, 2010; JP/AU: September 2, 2010; PAL: September 3, 2010	Release years by system: 2010 – Wii
Metroid: Other M Original release date(s): NA: August 31, 2010; JP/AU: September 2, 2010; PAL: September 3, 2010	Notes: Developed by Team Ninja.
Metroid: Samus Returns Original release date(s): WW: September 15, 2017	Release years by system: 2017 – Nintendo 3DS
Metroid: Samus Returns Original release date(s): WW: September 15, 2017	Notes: Remake of Metroid II: Return of Samus.
Metroid Dread Original release date: WW: October 8, 2021	Release years by system: 2021 – Nintendo Switch
Metroid Dread Original release date: WW: October 8, 2021	Notes: The first Metroid game for the Nintendo Switch.
Metroid Ravenous Original release date: WW: January 28, 2027	Release years by system: 2027 – Nintendo Switch 2
Metroid Ravenous Original release date: WW: January 28, 2027	Notes: Upcoming release

=== Metroid Prime series ===
Game	Details
Metroid Prime Original release date(s): NA: November 18, 2002; JP: February 28, 2003; EU: March 21, 2003; AU: April 3, 2003	Release years by system: 2002 – GameCube; 2009 – Wii
Metroid Prime Original release date(s): NA: November 18, 2002; JP: February 28, 2003; EU: March 21, 2003; AU: April 3, 2003	Notes: First 3D game in the series.; Gameplay tweaks were added to the PAL, Japanese and Player's Choice versions.; Re-released for the Wii in the New Play Control! series of GameCube remakes in Japan and as part of Metroid Prime: Trilogy internationally.
Metroid Prime 2: Echoes Original release date(s): NA: November 15, 2004; EU: November 26, 2004; AU: December 2, 2004; JP: May 26, 2005	Release years by system: 2004 – GameCube; 2009 – Wii
Metroid Prime 2: Echoes Original release date(s): NA: November 15, 2004; EU: November 26, 2004; AU: December 2, 2004; JP: May 26, 2005	Notes: Known in Japan as Metroid Prime 2: Dark Echoes. (Note: Japanese: メトロイドプライム2: ダークエコーズ, Hepburn: Metoroido Puraimu Tsū: Dāku Ekōzu); First game in the series with a multiplayer mode.; The PAL version lacks the standard 50 Hz mode and offers 60 Hz only.; Re-released for the Wii in the New Play Control! series of GameCube remakes in Japan and as part of Metroid Prime: Trilogy internationally.
Metroid Prime Pinball Original release date(s): NA: October 24, 2005; AU: December 1, 2005; JP: January 19, 2006; EU: June 22, 2007	Release years by system: 2005 – Nintendo DS
Metroid Prime Pinball Original release date(s): NA: October 24, 2005; AU: December 1, 2005; JP: January 19, 2006; EU: June 22, 2007	Notes: Remake of Metroid Prime in pinball form.; Bundled along with the Nintendo DS Rumble Pak.
Metroid Prime Hunters Original release date(s): NA: March 20, 2006; EU: May 5, 2006; AU: May 23, 2006; JP: June 1, 2006	Release years by system: 2006 – Nintendo DS
Metroid Prime Hunters Original release date(s): NA: March 20, 2006; EU: May 5, 2006; AU: May 23, 2006; JP: June 1, 2006	Notes: Preceded by Metroid Prime Hunters: First Hunt, which was a multiplayer demo included as a pack-in title with the launch of the original Nintendo DS in all regions except Japan.; First game in the series with online multiplayer.; First Nintendo DS game to allow voice chat between players over the internet.
Metroid Prime 3: Corruption Original release date(s): NA: August 27, 2007; PAL: October 26, 2007; AU: November 8, 2007; JP: March 6, 2008	Release years by system: 2007 – Wii
Metroid Prime 3: Corruption Original release date(s): NA: August 27, 2007; PAL: October 26, 2007; AU: November 8, 2007; JP: March 6, 2008	Notes: The first Metroid game for the Wii.; First game in the series to include a preview accessible online via a console.
Metroid Prime: Trilogy Original release date(s): NA: August 24, 2009; EU: September 4, 2009; AU: October 15, 2009	Release years by system: 2009 – Wii
Metroid Prime: Trilogy Original release date(s): NA: August 24, 2009; EU: September 4, 2009; AU: October 15, 2009	Notes: Contains Metroid Prime, Metroid Prime 2 and Metroid Prime 3, all with Wii Remote controls.
Metroid Prime: Federation Force Original release date(s): NA: August 19, 2016; JP: August 25, 2016; EU: September 2, 2016; AU: September 3, 2016	Release years by system: 2016 – Nintendo 3DS
Metroid Prime: Federation Force Original release date(s): NA: August 19, 2016; JP: August 25, 2016; EU: September 2, 2016; AU: September 3, 2016	Notes: The first Metroid game for the Nintendo 3DS.; Contains a game titled Metroid Prime: Blast Ball, a soccer-themed multiplayer minigame.
Metroid Prime Remastered Original release date(s): WW: February 8, 2023	Release years by system: 2023 – Nintendo Switch
Metroid Prime Remastered Original release date(s): WW: February 8, 2023	Notes: Remastered version of Metroid Prime.; Contains the original GameCube and gyroscopic control schemes as well as a standard dual-stick control scheme.
Metroid Prime 4: Beyond Original release date(s): WW: December 4, 2025	Release years by system: 2025 – Nintendo Switch; 2025 – Nintendo Switch 2

== Soundtracks ==
Title	Release date	Length	Label
Super Metroid – Sound in Action	June 22, 1994	58:49	Sony Records
Notes: Features music from Metroid and Super Metroid, in addition to four rearranged Super Metroid tracks.; Metroid music composed by Hirokazu Tanaka.; Super Metroid music composed by Kenji Yamamoto and Minako Hamano.
Metroid Prime & Fusion Original Soundtracks	June 18, 2003	2:12:00	Scitron
Notes: Two-CD set; each disc contains the soundtrack of one of the games.; Metroid Prime music composed by Kenji Yamamoto and Kouichi Kyuma.; Metroid Fusion music composed by Minako Hamano and Akira Fujiwara.

== Printed media ==
=== Comic books ===
Game	Company	Publisher	Release date
Metroid	Valiant Comics	Nintendo Comics System, issue #2	July 1990
Notes: Consists of three short stories across one issue, themed after, but not directly adapting the game: The Coming of a Hero (2 pages), by George Caragonne, James Brock, Bob Layton, Jade, Kathryn Bolinger.; Metroid (1 page), by George Caragonne, Mickey Ritter, Jan Harpes, Jade.; Deceit Du Jour (10 pages), by Mark McClellan and Bill Vallely, Vince Mielcarek, Bob Layton, Jade, Joe Q and The Gradations.
Super Metroid	Nintendo	Nintendo Power, issues #57–61	February–May 1994
Notes: Five-part adaptation of the game by Benimaru Itoh.
Metroid Prime	Dreamwave Productions	Nintendo Power, issues #164–166	January–March 2003
Notes: Two-part adaptation of game.; Written by Kato Li (script), Sigmund Torre (art, with one page by Pat Lee), Gary Yeung and Alan Wang (colors).

=== Manga ===
Game	Publisher	Release date
Metroid	Wanpakku Comics	1986
Notes: 195 page Manga/Strategy Guide, released only in Japan.
Super Metroid	Shounen Oh Game Comic, issue #1	August 1994
Notes: 18-page adaptation, consisting of comedic strips with four panels.
Samus and Joey	Comic Bom Bom	December 2002–April 2004
Notes: 5-part manga involving the adventures of Samus Aran and a boy called Joey from a frontier planet.
Metroid	Monthly Magazine Z	November 2003–May 2004
Notes: Two-volume manga, tells the backstory of Samus Aran up to the events of Metroid.; Written by Kouji Tazawa (script) and Kenji Ishikawa (art).; The first two chapters of Volume 1 received an online version with color and sound effects.
Metroid Prime 2: Echoes	Comic Bom Bom	July 2005–January 2006
Notes: Adaptation of the game, released across seven issues of the magazine.; Written by Hisashi Matsumoto.
