= List of Metroid characters =

Metroid (Note: Japanese: メトロイド, Hepburn: Metoroido) is a series of nonlinear science fiction action games published by Nintendo, featuring side-scrolling, metroidvania, and first-person shooter elements. The player character and protagonist of the series is Samus Aran, a space-faring bounty hunter who battles Space Pirates and a species called the Metroid.

== Major characters ==
=== Samus Aran ===
Samus Aran (サムス・アラン, Samusu Aran) is a bounty hunter and the protagonist of the series. Prior to the events of the series, her homeworld was attacked by the Space Pirates, and her parents were murdered by their leader Ridley. This led to her being taken in by the Chozo aliens, who saved her life and raised her to become a warrior. She wears a futuristic suit equipped with armor, blaster cannons and other weapons such as missiles. The additional protection provided by the suit allows Samus to survive on other planets. Samus also appears in the Super Smash Bros. series as a playable character.

=== Ridley ===
Ridley (リドリー) is a high-ranking Space Pirate and major recurring antagonist who serves as Samus's archenemy. He has been defeated by Samus multiple times and was the final boss in Metroid: Samus Returns. Despite these defeats, he is always revived by the Space Pirates (or accidentally by the Galactic Federation in Metroid: Other M) using cloning or robotics. Other than Samus and the titular Metroids, Ridley is the only character to appear somewhat consistently throughout the series. He is directly responsible for the invasion of Samus' home planet and the death of her parents and is the franchise's most frequently recurring villain.

Outside of the Metroid series, Ridley (in cyborg form) is a boss in the campaign of Super Smash Bros. Brawl and Super Smash Bros. 4, and a playable character in Super Smash Bros. Ultimate.

=== Mother Brain ===
Mother Brain (マザーブレイン) is a brain-like supercomputer and the main antagonist of Metroid, its remake Metroid: Zero Mission, and Super Metroid. The Chozo created it as a councilor, and as a means to "accelerate their plan to link the galaxy into one unified society". Mother Brain is depicted as a large brain with cybernetic spikes and a single eye, usually contained in a glass tube which Samus must break in order to injure it. In Super Metroid, Mother Brain also rises from the floor and reveals a grotesque body after her tank is destroyed.

In the Metroid manga, during the Space Pirate invasion of Zebes, it sees the Space Pirates as a "perfect force capable of restoring true order to the universe", and successfully established itself as one of their leaders. At the same time, Mother Brain attempts to persuade Samus to be an ally in order to "build a new age for the universe" by claiming that because it built the power suit that Samus wears, she is indebted to Mother Brain.

Samus seemingly destroys Mother Brain in the original Metroid, but again confronts it in Super Metroid. It was revealed in Metroid Prime 3 that the Galactic Federation had constructed biomechanical supercomputers called Auroras, and that there were plans for a "Future Aurora Complex", which appears to be the Mother Brain depicted in Super Metroid. The main antagonist of Metroid: Other M, MB, is an android housing an AI cloned from Mother Brain's genetic material from Samus' suit.

=== Adam Malkovich ===
Voiced by: Rikiya Koyama (Japanese); Dave Elvin (English)

Samus' former commanding officer in the Galactic Federation army, he only appears in person in Metroid: Other M, in which he plays a major role. Initially skeptical of accepting her help with his team's mission, he eventually serves as Samus's commander for the duration of the game. Samus and Adam are shown to have had a very close relationship, with her seeing him as a surrogate father. Adam is also notable for his commitment to the greater good even at personal cost: in the past he had allowed his brother to pass away in order to avoid risking the deaths of Samus and his team, and upon entering the Sector Zero area of the game, he activates the laboratory's self-destruct protocol, sacrificing himself to save Samus again. In Metroid Fusion, it is revealed that the Navigation Computer of Samus's new ship is Adam Malkovich's consciousness in computer form. This computer consciousness returns in Metroid Dread, albeit impersonated for most of the game by Raven Beak.

=== Raven Beak ===
Voiced by: Dave Rogers Ruiz

Raven Beak is the leader of the Mawkin, a Chozo warrior tribe, and the main antagonist of Metroid Dread. He and the Mawkin aided the Thoha, a fellow tribe of the Chozo, in containing the Metroids on SR388, and also gave some of his DNA to Samus. However, after learning that the Thoha intended to destroy the planet to get rid of the Metroids, he murdered them all except one: a scientist named Quiet Robe, whose control over the Metroids was necessary to use the creatures as a tool to take over the galaxy. He is shown to be both cunning and powerful, luring Samus and the Galactic Federation to the planet ZDR with footage of X parasites before ambushing and nearly killing Samus. He then pretends to be Adam, putting her through numerous hardships during her mission to get her to awaken her Metroid powers before asking her to join him. He is ultimately killed by Samus in a final confrontation.

=== Metroid Prime / Dark Samus ===
Metroid Prime is the titular main antagonist and final boss of Metroid Prime. Its later form, Dark Samus, is a major antagonist in Metroid Prime 2: Echoes and the main antagonist of Metroid Prime 3: Corruption.

As Metroid Prime, it is a strange, black-carapaced, red-eyed creature with a humanoid face within its shell and the ability to control and horribly mutate anything it attaches to. Metroid Prime was formed when a Phazon meteor known as a Leviathan impacted on the planet Tallon IV, released its living core, and fused with a Metroid. It caused severe damage to the Chozo colony before the Artifact Temple was built to contain Metroid Prime inside the impact crater of the Leviathan, where it remained until the events of Prime (although to what degree differs between versions).

After its defeat, the creature takes Samus' Phazon Suit to reconstruct itself into a body similar to hers, resulting in the being referred to as "Dark Samus." In Metroid Prime 2: Echoes, Dark Samus arrives on Aether while chasing the planet's Phazon. Shortly after, Samus arrives and encounters Dark Samus many times, eventually defeating her as Dark Aether was destroyed, but a post-credits scene shows Dark Samus reforming herself in deep space.

Metroid Prime 3: Corruption Dark Samus has brainwashed the Space Pirates to be their leader, and begins her mission to spread Phazon across the universe. In an attack to the Galactic Federation vessel G.F.S. Valhalla, Dark Samus steals a supercomputer, the Aurora Unit 313, which is used to implant a computer virus into the Galactic Federation's network of Aurora Units, crippling it. Shortly after, Dark Samus leads an attack on Norion, corrupting Samus and other bounty hunters with Phazon. After Samus destroys the Leviathans of four planets, she goes to Phaaze, where she finally defeats Dark Samus, who then merges itself with the Aurora Unit 313 in a last-ditch effort to defeat Samus. After the Aurora Unit is destroyed, Phaaze explodes, and all Phazon in the galaxy is rendered inert.

Dark Samus appears in Super Smash Bros. for Nintendo 3DS and Wii U as an Assist Trophy and an alternate costume for Samus. She became a playable character in Super Smash Bros. Ultimate with a similar set of moves to Samus.

IGN listed Dark Samus as the 88th best video game villain, describing her as being a "creepily evil doppelganger" that never truly dies. TheGamer listed her as the 6th best Metroid character, calling her "one of the most evil and horrifying entities in the series." GamesRadar+ ranked her as being the 4th best fictional evil clone, praising the fact that "[while] evil clones in other games tend to be one-off gimmicks, [she] endured long enough to be the central villain", and stating that unlike "other dark clones [who] just want to bump off their originals, Dark Samus wanted to conquer, and she came awfully damn close – and may come back to do so again".

=== Sylux ===
Voiced by: Laith Wallschleger

Sylux is a bounty hunter and former Federation trooper, first appearing as a recurring antagonist in Metroid Prime Hunters and later as the main antagonist of Metroid Prime 4: Beyond. He is considered to be Samus' rival, harboring a great hatred towards her and the Galactic Federation as a whole. His main weapon is the Shock Coil, an electric-based prototype weapon stolen from the Galactic Federation, which drains energy. He can also transform into an alternate form called the Lockjaw, which acts similarly to Samus' Morph Ball, and has a ship named the Delano 7.

In Metroid Prime Hunters, Sylux and five other bounty hunters try to find the "ultimate power" that is said to be located in the Alimbic Cluster. He and the other bounty hunters battle Samus throughout the game, and are saved by her from Gorea at its end. His spaceship appears in the special ending of Metroid Prime 3: Corruption, which is unlocked after reaching 100% completion, in pursuit of Samus Aran. Sylux also appears in the special ending of Metroid Prime: Federation Force, unlocked if a Metroid egg is rescued in a previous mission, in which he infiltrates a Galactic Federation research station, and releases an infant Metroid from a stasis tube.

In Metroid Prime 4: Beyond, Sylux and the Space Pirates attack a Federation facility holding a mysterious artifact. The artifact sends him, Samus, and several Federation soldiers to the planet Viewros. Decoys of Sylux are fought throughout the game. In visions seen by Samus, it is revealed that Sylux is a former Federation marine and the sole survivor of his platoon after a disastrous mission, in which he wanted to capture a Space Pirate superweapon and recklessly disobeyed his superiors, getting his men killed; Samus then destroyed the superweapon as ordered, making Sylux hate Samus and the Federation. After Samus defeats him in a final confrontation, he damages the Master Teleporter, forcing her comrades to sacrifice themselves in order to allow Samus to leave the planet.

=== Baby Metroid ===
The Metroid larva is chronologically the last Metroid of its race following the events of Metroid II: Return of Samus and its remake Metroid: Samus Returns. At the beginning of Super Metroid, Samus describes how a Metroid larva hatched from an egg and immediately imprinted upon her, believing her to be its mother. She brought the larva to Ceres Space Colony, where scientists could study it. Just after leaving, she received a distress call and returned to find the scientists dead and the larva stolen. The search for the Baby Metroid is the source of conflict in the story. When encountered by Samus, the Baby Metroid attacks Samus and nearly drains all her energy. During the final battle against Mother Brain, the Baby Metroid comes to Samus' aid by recharging her energy, but is destroyed by the Mother Brain. Samus avenges its death by destroying Mother Brain. After a planet-wide self-destruction, Samus mourns the death of the Metroid.

In Metroid: Other M, the Baby Metroid is mentioned in the opening cutscene as it serves as a reminder for Samus' loss of loved ones in her life. Later, on Bottle Ship's Sector Zero, she encounters a Metroid that resembles the Baby Metroid, but it immediately attacks her.

TheGamer ranked the Baby Metroid as the 3rd best Metroid character, calling its sacrifice in Super Metroid "one of the most emotionally-satisfying moments in the series".

== Supporting characters ==
=== Kraid ===
Kraid (クレイド, Kureido) is a gigantic lizard-like beast and as a member of the Space Pirate's High Command. His most prominent feature is his grotesquely oversized belly. First appearing in the original Metroid, he is the first part of the mini-boss duo along with Ridley. In Super Metroid, he appears in his giant form, two screens tall and almost a screen wide. Metroid: Zero Mission, the 2004 remake of the original Metroid, depicts him in a similar size to his appearance in Super Metroid. He was also slated to appear in Metroid Prime as a boss in the Phazon Mines, with a metal dome covering his head and blue Phazon veins on his belly, but was removed due to time constraints. Kraid returns in Metroid Dread after being captured and experimented on by Raven Beak where he is shown as the first and most significant boss of Cataris, a lava filled zone used to heat the rest of the area he is present in, and is the second boss of the overall game.

Kraid also makes an appearance in the background of the Brinstar Depths stage in Super Smash Bros. Melee and Super Smash Bros. Ultimate where he periodically slashes and rotates the stage.

TheGamer listed Kraid as the 7th best character in the Metroid series, calling him "terrifying", "ruthless", and "iconic". Polygon's Michael McWhertor praised the intentionally-added "quick-kill" strategy for Kraid in Dread, which uses bombs—items normally not acquired before Kraid's battle—to drastically reduce the length of the fight, calling it "a fun little reward for Metroid sequence breakers from developers MercurySteam and Nintendo."

=== Etecoons and Dachora ===
The Etecoons and Dachora are friendly creatures that Samus encounters on planet Zebes in Super Metroid, and demonstrate to the player how to wall-jump and Shinespark, respectively. At the end of the game during the escape from Zebes, the player can help the Dachora and Etecoons to escape as well by going to an earlier room and blasting open the wall, providing an exit for them. If this is done, they are shown flying off to the right in an escape pod as the planet explodes. They are encountered again in Metroid Fusion at the Habitation Deck. After releasing them, they find shelter on board Samus's ship. Later on, it is revealed they have a hidden talent with ships, saving Samus's life by piloting her ship during a crucial moment.

The optional saving of the Etecoons and Dachora in Super Metroid has become a popular element of speedrunning events at GDQ. During the event, viewers are able to either donate money towards "saving the animals", which wastes time, or towards "killing the animals", by escaping normally letting them die off-screen, with the winning option being conducted by the speedrunner. As of early 2017, these donations pulled in nearly $100,000.

== Species and factions ==
=== Metroids ===
Artwork of the larval form of the Metroid species, from Metroid: Samus Returns

The Metroids (メトロイド) are floating, predatory jellyfish-like organisms with tripartite nuclei and the titular characters of the series. They are capable of siphoning an undetectable life energy from any life form, generally causing Samus's health to rapidly decrease. Created by the Chozo as a type of bioweapon in order to combat the more dangerous X Parasites, they are one of the primary plot points in the Metroid games as Samus either fights them or tries to prevent the Space Pirates or Galactic Federation from harnessing their powers for evil.

Metroid II: Return of Samus and the remake Metroid: Samus Returns established a five-stage life cycle in which those Metroids native to their home planet SR388 go through two stages of ecdysis followed by two stages of mutation, thus maturing through five previously unknown forms: Alpha Metroid, Gamma Metroid, Zeta Metroid, Omega Metroid, and the Queen Metroid. They are frequently shown to be vulnerable to ice-based weaponry such as the Ice Beam and freeze guns.

Game Informer writer Ben Reevs called the Metroid their favorite alien race in video gaming, praising how their appearance is "truly alien" and that they "pose an immediate and real danger" when they appear. Kurt Kalata of Hardcore Gaming 101 called their design "iconic", and praised their first appearance in the original Metroid, saying that it was "a moment of shock and terror almost unlike anything in any other NES game", especially if the player did not know how to beat them.

=== Space Pirates ===
A hostile group known as Space Pirates (スペースパイレーツ, Supēsu Pairētsu), or Zebesians (ゼーベス星人, Zēbesu Seijin), serve as the antagonists of the Metroid series. They are a group of "interstellar nomads" resembling humanoid reptiles, insects, or crustaceans who plunder colonies and ships and exist in an insect-like hive society. Important leaders include Ridley, the Space Pirate commander, Mother Brain, the bio-mechanical defense of Zebes controlled by the Space Pirates, and Kraid, a recurring boss. The organization also includes a winged, mantis-like species, the Ki Hunters.

The Space Pirates are interested in Metroid research, especially in using Metroids for energy generation, as soldiers, and for experimentation – their Phazon experiments produced all the Metroid variants seen in the Prime games with the exception of Metroid Prime itself. The organization is destroyed during the climax of Super Metroid, but a group within the Galactic Federation resurrects the Space Pirates, Ridley, and the Metroids, explaining their continued presence in Other M and Fusion.

Series director Yoshio Sakamoto stated that the Space Pirates that invaded Zebes took "Zebesian" as a general name for themselves after the conquest of the planet, comparing it to people who referred themselves as "Americans" when they emigrated to the United States.

=== Chozo ===
The Chozo are a mysterious, birdlike species that are featured throughout the Metroid series. The origins and age of the Chozo race and civilization are unknown. They were once spread across several planets in the Metroid universe, notably Elysia, SR388, Tallon IV, Zebes, and ZDR. The sage-like Chozo were extremely advanced in technology, and took pride in their elaborate statuary. They also exchanged knowledge with other species, including the Luminoth of Aether, the Reptilicus of Bryyo, and the Elysians of Elysia (robots built by the Chozo). Lore found in Metroid Prime 3 specifically mentions a fellowship of enlightened races that once existed between the Chozo, Luminoth, Reptilicus, and Ylla. The Chozo were also responsible for raising Samus, infusing her with their DNA and creating her Power Suit, and for the creation and breeding of Metroids to combat the X Parasites.

While in the Japanese versions of the games, the beings are only ever identified by the generic term chōjin-zoku (鳥人族, lit. "bird-folk race"), a misunderstanding during the localization process led to the mistaken adoption of the descriptor chōzō (鳥像, "bird statue"), rendered "Chozo", in the English versions instead. In Super Metroid, some of the Chozo statues would rise up and attack Samus; these bosses are called Torizo, substituting the native Japanese word tori ("bird") for the usual, Chinese-derived chō. In the late game of Metroid Prime Chozo ghosts appear and attack Samus. Although originally allies, the Chozo became maddened by the Phazon corruption of their planet, and could no longer distinguish friend from foe. In Metroid Zero Mission, Samus is able to enter the Chozo Ruins.

In Metroid Dread, it is revealed the Chozo split into two tribes: the peaceful Thoha and the warlike Mawkin. The Thoha initially colonized SR388 and encountered the X parasites, genetically engineering the Metroids to serve as their predators. While the Thoha feared both species, the leader of the Mawkin, Raven Beak, saw potential in the Metroids, and ordered the killing of all Thoha, save Quiet Robe, so they would not obstruct his plans. However, the Mawkin were infected by the X parasite, leaving only Raven Beak and Quiet Robe alive.

In the Metroid manga series, which is a prequel to the original game, two Chozo who had a hand in Samus's origins were introduced as Old Bird and Gray Voice. When Samus lost her family to the Space Pirates, they raised her. Gray Voice was also one of the Chozo who donated his DNA to Samus. Gray Voice later feigned joining the Space Pirates in an attempt to destroy the renegade Mother Brain.

=== Galactic Federation ===
The Galactic Federation (銀河連邦, Ginga Renpō) is the governing body of the galaxy formed by an alliance of alien species and often contracts Samus with difficult missions to complete. The Galactic Federation Police was formed in response to the Space Pirates. The Galactic Federation's troopers also use powered armor, and their technology usually bears multiple versions of their symbol, a stylized cross-shape. Troopers are also given a basic repeating assault weapon, and in Metroid Prime 3, some are equipped with the Phazon Enhancement Device.

Samus trained in the Federation's military before becoming a bounty hunter, leaving some time after a disagreement with her commanding officer, Adam Malkovich in the events of Metroid: Other M.

=== Ing Horde ===
The Ing Horde is a race of powerful and intelligent dark creatures appearing in Metroid Prime 2: Echoes. They are capable of possessing anything organic, mechanical, artificial, dead, or alive (including the Metroids).

They originated when a Leviathan from Phaaze impacted the planet Aether and created Dark Aether, a trans-dimensional duplicate of the planet. The Ing then fight against the Luminoth in a decades-long war over the Light of Aether, and appear to be on the verge of victory until Samus comes to Aether looking for a missing Galactic Federation squadron and fights against the Ing. She recovers the missing energy using an Energy Transfer Module that the Ing took from the Luminoth, and eventually defeats the Emperor Ing, destroying Dark Aether and the Ing for good.

=== X Parasites ===
The X Parasite is a unique parasite appearing in Metroid Fusion, Metroid: Samus Returns, Metroid Dread, and the Metroid manga. X are capable of infecting other organisms and mimicking their prey's DNA and memories. The infected organism then dies and is replaced by the copy. X can also mimic biomechanical technology. They were considered so dangerous that the Chozo initially created the Metroids to defeat them.

They are the main antagonist in Fusion. In the game, Samus is infected by an X parasite and is only saved after being given a vaccine with Metroid DNA. It then mimics her Power Suit to create SA-X, which then hunts Samus.

The final X Parasites are contained in Elun on the planet ZDR. Since Samus is immune to their infection, she is dispatched to investigate. The parasites are released by Raven Beak to hinder Samus. The bosses Escue, Golzuna, Experiment No. Z-57, as well as the Chozo Soldiers, are all X. After being defeated by Samus, Raven Beak is infected by an X. The detonation of ZDR at the game's finale presumably marks their extinction.

=== The Lamorn ===
The Lamorn are an extinct tentacled humanoid race first appearing in Metroid Prime 4.

== Reception ==
TheGamer praised the series' "fascinating selection of Bounty Hunters, antagonists, and old acquaintances", noting their "intriguing backstories and personalities."
