= Ridley (Metroid) =

Metroid antagonist

- Metroid character
- Artwork of Ridley from Super Smash Bros. Ultimate (2018)
- First game: Metroid (1986)
- Created by: Makoto Kano
- Designed by: Hiroji Kiyotake

Ridley (Japanese: リドリー, Hepburn: Ridorī), also known in-universe by the alias Cunning God of Death, is a character and a major antagonist in the Metroid series. An evil and aggressive draconic extraterrestrial, he became Samus Aran's archnemesis after murdering the latter's parents as he led a Space Pirate raid on her home planet. Though destroyed numerous times by Samus, he is repeatedly resurrected through various means.

Originally appearing as a subordinate of Mother Brain (another primary antagonist), he returns in Metroid Prime and Metroid Prime 3: Corruption in his cybernetic Meta Ridley form, commanding the Space Pirates himself. Ridley is killed during the events of Super Metroid, though a clone of him introduced in Metroid: Other M persists after his death. Ridley has been met with a largely positive response since his debut, and has garnered a large fan-base regarding his presence in the Super Smash Bros. crossover fighting game franchise.

== Appearances ==
Ridley's debut is in the Nintendo Entertainment System video game Metroid. He and Kraid are Space Pirate figureheads charged with protecting Mother Brain at a base on the planet Zebes, where they are cloning an alien species known as Metroids with the intention of converting them into biological weapons. Samus Aran kills him and the rest of the Space Pirates. Ridley later appeared in the Metroid manga, where he is revealed to have caused the death of Samus's parents in an attack on her home planet when she was a child. Ridley is highly intelligent despite his appearance, and has a unique ability to recover from seemingly lethal attacks. In Metroid's remake, Metroid: Zero Mission, a mechanical doppelganger known as Mecha Ridley confronts Samus in a unique post-game mission exclusive to Zero Mission, acting as the final boss.

Ridley appears in the 1994 Super Nintendo Entertainment System title Super Metroid, where he attacks a space station containing the last surviving Metroid, fleeing with it to Zebes. Samus gives chase and kills Ridley. This is the final appearance of his original form in Metroid's in-universe chronology, and believed to be his final death. He later appears in Metroid Prime, which takes place following the events of Metroid. Ridley is referred to as Meta Ridley in-game, and sports mechanical enhancements. He is encountered again in Metroid Prime 3: Corruption, where he battles Samus under the name Omega Ridley. Ridley appears again in Metroid: Samus Returns, where he appears as the final boss in the form of Proteus Ridley.

A clone of Ridley is created during the 2010 game Metroid: Other M. The clone takes the form of a creature known as Little Birdie, which quickly evolves into a fully grown Ridley. The Ridley clone is later killed, and its corpse is collected and re-encountered in-universe in the 2002 game Metroid Fusion, where it is replicated by the game's main antagonists, the X Parasites. The clone is destroyed following this appearance. This is the final appearance of a version of Ridley in Metroid's in-universe chronology.

Ridley appears in the Super Smash Bros. crossover fighting game series in many of its installments. He appears in a cameo in both Super Smash Bros. and Melee, and acts as a boss opponent in Brawl and Super Smash Bros. for Nintendo 3DS and Wii U. He later appears as a playable character in Ultimate. Ridley additionally makes guest appearances in other video games such as Dead or Alive: Dimensions.

== Development ==
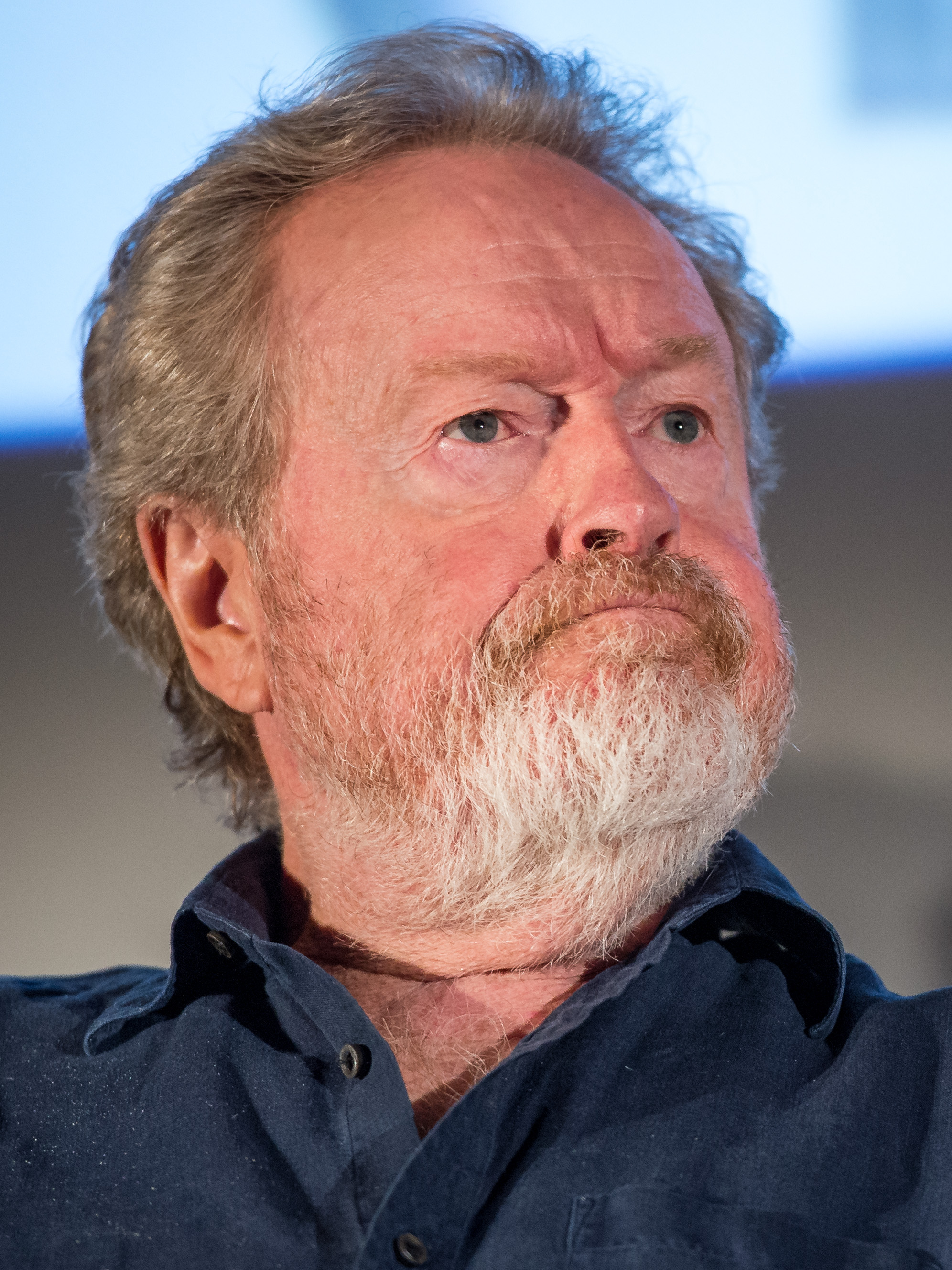
The 1979 film Alien acted as a major inspiration to the Metroid series, and Ridley is believed to be named after the film's director, Ridley Scott (pictured)

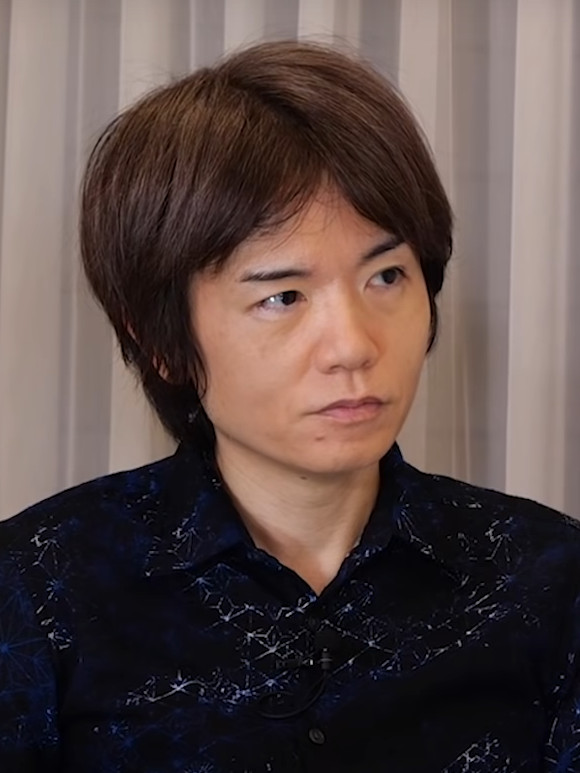
Masahiro Sakurai (pictured), the director of the Super Smash Bros. series, was initially conflicted on including Ridley in the series.

Ridley is believed to be named after Ridley Scott, director of the 1979 film Alien, which has been described by character designer Yoshio Sakamoto as a "huge influence" on the world of the Metroid series.

Mike Sneath, one of three senior character artists for Metroid Prime, was responsible for designing the Meta Ridley version of Ridley seen in Metroid Prime. It took him about "20 to 25 days" to model and texture Meta Ridley, citing the wings as having taken a few days of his time, commenting that it took him a while to get the shaders to work to give his wings the appearance of having "holographic energy". He was not involved with designing the battle with Meta Ridley, which was left up to the game designers. Andrew Jones, the lead concept artist for Metroid Prime, had little to do with the design of Ridley. The initial design submitted was rejected by Nintendo, while the second design the artists submitted was approved. Steve Barcia, the executive producer of Retro Studios, called Ridley his favorite enemy from Metroid Prime due to the quality of the battle and his fan appeal. He added that such a battle was rare for a first-person shooter, which helped to set Metroid Prime apart.

The director of the Super Smash Bros. series, Masahiro Sakurai, stated in an interview with Nintendo Power that the development team considered including Ridley as a playable character in Super Smash Bros. Brawl but decided against the idea due to creative difficulties. In an interview with IGN about Ridley's exclusion from Super Smash Bros. for Nintendo 3DS and Wii U, Sakurai argued that reducing Ridley's size, wingspan or mobility to include him as a fighter would not be true to the character, who is supposed to be a "truly threatening presence" that could only be correctly portrayed as a stage boss unencumbered by a fighter's size and balance restrictions. Sakurai said that high demand from players inspired him to add several playable characters to Super Smash Bros. Ultimate, including Ridley.

== Reception ==
Throughout the history of the Metroid series, Ridley has received positive reception as a series antagonist by multiple sources, including Nintendo Power, who ranked him as the 6th best video game villain. IGN editor Jesse Schedeen called Ridley the real villain of the Metroid series, commenting that he would have to be included in a Metroid film if one were made due to him being too important to leave out. Author Daryl Baxter in the book 50 Years of Boss Fights found Ridley's boss fight in Metroid Prime to be emblematic of the series' shift to 3D, believing it showcased the effective transition of iconic elements of the series to a new medium. TheGamer writer Eric Switzer found Ridley to be a good polar opposite to Samus, believing him to be representative of what would happen if Samus were to let go of her moral constraints, but disliked Ridley's role in Metroid Prime, feeling he did not have a strong presence in the game's plot which made his final battle with Samus feel unearned. Jenni Lada of Siliconera praised his Samus Returns fight, calling it "a highlight of the game and one of the most intimidating challenges", while also praising the foreshadowing towards Super Metroid, the in-universe sequel, during it, such as Ridley dropping the baby Metroid, and it giving some of his energy to Samus.

Ridley has been a popular character suggestion in the Super Smash Bros. series from fans, with demand for his inclusion dating back to Melee. In a 2008 issue of Nintendo Power, Masahiro Sakurai stated his reluctance to include Ridley in the series for a variety of reasons. This resulted in a vocal fanbase for the character, which took the form of both ironic internet memes and genuine support for his inclusion. Kotaku writer Nathan Grayson believed the appeal of Ridley lay in Ridley's status as a "legacied" Nintendo character, as well as how the Metroid franchise lacked significant representation on the roster of the Super Smash Bros. series. His initial lack of inclusion also resulted in widespread negative response on the Internet, especially when it was revealed that he was not playable in Super Smash Bros. for Nintendo 3DS and Wii U. Many fans were also upset due to his lack of inclusion while other characters with high similarities to pre-existing characters on the roster (such as Kid Icarus character Dark Pit) were included. Polygon writer Ryan Gilliam discussed Ridley's long-standing popularity with the Super Smash Bros. fanbase, which he believed to have started in the form of rumors in the early 2000s. He found Ridley to be a popular character with fans due to his history not only in Metroid's fanbase, but also in Smash's fanbase due to the long-lasting desire for Ridley to be included in the series. Due to Sakurai's reluctance to include Ridley in the series, a popular internet meme was created about Ridley being "too big" for Smash.
