= Gorea =

Gorea may refer to:

- Gorean, from the planet Gor in the science fiction novels by John Norman
- Gorea, the main antagonist of the video game Metroid Prime Hunters
