= Metroid Prime 4: Beyond =

2025 video game

- Developer: Retro Studios (Note: Additional development by Next Level Games and Virtuos)
- Publisher: Nintendo
- Directors: Bill Vandervoort; Jhony Ljungstedt; Eric Sebesta
- Producers: Jeff Moreaux; Kensuke Tanabe
- Designers: Bill Vandervoort; Stephen Dupree
- Programmers: Eric Sebesta; Bharathwaj Nandakumar
- Artist: Jhony Ljungstedt
- Writers: Jesse Lee Keeter; Tracy Nicoletti; Megan Fausti
- Composers: Kenji Yamamoto; Minako Hamano
- Series: Metroid
- Platforms: Nintendo Switch; Nintendo Switch 2
- Release: December 4, 2025
- Genre: Action-adventure
- Mode: Single-player

Metroid Prime 4: Beyond is a 2025 action-adventure game developed by Retro Studios and published by Nintendo for the Nintendo Switch and the Nintendo Switch 2. It is the tenth main Metroid game. Players control the bounty hunter Samus Aran, who is transported to the planet Viewros and tasked with a mission from its inhabitants, the Lamorn. She fights for survival while confronting her rival Sylux, who holds a grudge against her and the Galactic Federation.

Beyond retains the first-person gameplay of previous Metroid Prime games. Players guide Samus through non-linear environments, fight enemies, upgrade her abilities and scan objects and lifeforms for information. Beyond adds psychic abilities, used to control beam shots and manipulate objects, and a hub world, which Samus crosses with a new motorcycle, the Vi-O-La. The Switch 2 version includes support for the Joy-Con 2 mouse controls for more precise aiming.

Nintendo announced Metroid Prime 4 at E3 2017. It was initially developed by Bandai Namco Studios and overseen by Kensuke Tanabe, the producer of the previous Metroid Prime games. In 2019, unhappy with progress, Nintendo announced that development had restarted with Tanabe under Retro, who developed the previous Metroid Prime games. Nintendo revealed Beyond in June 2024 and confirmed the Switch 2 version in April 2025. Beyond was the final Nintendo game to involve Tanabe as producer before his retirement in June 2026.

Metroid Prime 4: Beyond was released on December 4, 2025, eighteen years after Metroid Prime 3: Corruption (2007). It sold more than one million copies and received generally positive reviews. Critics praised its environments, atmosphere, and the enhanced graphics on Switch 2. Reception was divided regarding the non-player characters, and the linear structure and open-world elements were criticized.

== Gameplay ==
Gameplay screenshot showing Samus battling enemies in Fury Green

Metroid Prime 4: Beyond is an action-adventure game played from a first-person perspective. Players control Samus Aran using the Joy-Con controllers to move, jump, aim at enemies and objects, and fire weapons.

Beyond takes place across a vast world of different regions, in which gameplay focuses on solving various puzzles, exploring rooms, and defeating enemies with a variety of weapons and the aid of a "lock-on" function that allows Samus to move in a circle while staying aimed on an enemy. The lock-on function can also help with interacting with objects, such as connecting a Grapple Beam to swing between platforms. The game uses a first-person view, except in Morph Ball mode, in which Samus' suit transforms into an armored ball and the game uses a third-person camera. A heads-up display, which simulates the inside of Samus' helmet during first-person view, provides a radar and mini-map functions, as well as displays on health and ammo amounts; when fighting bosses, the display also keeps track of their health. The player can scan objects and lifeforms to gather information.

New to Beyond are psychic powers, which allow Samus to operate specialized mechanisms, see hidden platforms, and perform guided shots against enemies. Beyond also adds a hub world, Sol Valley, which Samus crosses with a motorcycle, the Vi-O-La. The motorcycle can perform manoeuvres that provide a speed boost and allow Samus to defend against enemies. At times, Samus is assisted by Galactic Federation soldiers who assist with puzzles and combat. The Nintendo Switch 2 version allows players to use the Joy-Con 2 controller as a mouse, similarly to a PC first-person shooter.

== Plot ==
Metroid Prime 4: Beyond takes place between the events of Metroid: Other M and Metroid Fusion. The Space Pirates, using Metroids capable of possessing a host, attack a Federation facility on Tanamaar which recently unearthed an artifact. Samus is dispatched by the Galactic Federation to prevent the Pirates from stealing it. The Pirates are being led by Sylux, a rogue hunter whom Samus had previously encountered. (Note: As depicted in Metroid Prime Hunters) In the confrontation with him, Sylux accidentally damages the artifact, causing it to activate and teleport everything in its surroundings to the unknown planet of Viewros.

On Viewros, Samus explores the Chrono Tower. She acquires a crystal with psychic capabilities and uncovers a holographic recording from Chatoyant Vooloon, the last priest of the extinct Lamorn race. Facing extinction, the Lamorn prophesized the arrival of a "Chosen One" and made plans for their legacy to be preserved and taken to a new world via their Master Teleporter. It can only be activated by five keys scattered across Viewros, with Samus starting in the jungles of Fury Green. There she rescues the timid Federation technician Myles MacKenzie while they are hunted by feral creatures called grievers.

Myles sets up a base camp in Fury Green to help Samus. Samus learns that the Lamorn were cultivating their psychic tree to grow a memory fruit for the Chosen One to plant on a new world as their legacy. The cultivation can only be completed by feeding the fruit with green energy—a life energy uncovered by the Lamorn contained in crystals across Viewros. Sylux takes control of the Chrono Tower, erects a barrier around it, and infuses Metroids into the master teleporter key's guardians before Samus can reach them.

Acquiring a Vi-O-La motorcycle, Samus encounters the Federation soldiers Reger Tokabi, Ezra Duke, Nora Armstrong, and the combat robot VUE-995 on her journey. Recordings reveal that while the Lamorn race had hoped to use green energy to nurture the planet, it made the wildlife aggressive and transformed the Lamorn into grievers. The surviving Lamorn sealed themselves into the Chrono Tower, with hope someone would end their suffering.

Samus secures the keys for the teleporter, and uses a teleporter chip recovered by Reger to find mech parts. Myles repairs a giant Federation mech to breach the barrier around the Chrono Tower. Samus and the squad enter the tower and activate the master teleporter. Sylux ambushes them and uses assimilated teleportation technology to battle Samus in an alternate dimension, but she defeats him. Sylux returns and critically damages the teleporter, and Myles is injured protecting Samus. The soldiers restrain him and plea for Samus to leave while she is trapped in the unstable teleporter. Samus returns to Tanamaar and plants the memory fruit, accelerating its growth using the psychic crystal. In tribute to the soldiers, she leaves Reger Tokabi's "Sollan" pendant on the sprouting tree as a memorial.

On 100% completion, a cutscene details Sylux's backstory as a Federation field captain, in which he recklessly disobeys orders to maintain position and await Samus's arrival to claim a Space Pirate superweapon, which left him as the sole survivor of his platoon. Samus then effortlessly destroyed the weapon, beginning his hatred of her and the Federation.

== Development ==
Metroid Prime 4 was produced by Kensuke Tanabe, who produced the previous Metroid Prime games. Its development was troubled, originating at Bandai Namco but restarted from scratch with Retro Studios after the Bandai Namco version failed to meet Nintendo's standards. Retro's work took place amid the COVID-19 pandemic and changing attitudes to open world games.

=== Bandai Namco version ===
During a 2015 interview with Eurogamer, Kensuke Tanabe first mentioned that the next entry in the Metroid Prime series likely wouldn't be produced for Nintendo's Wii U home console, but instead for its successor, the Nintendo Switch. He also suspected it would take around three years to make if development were to begin in 2015. Tanabe shared several ideas for the potential next installment, including a narrative focused on Sylux, who was introduced in Metroid Prime Hunters, and increased use of Galactic Federation characters.

Development began in 2016, following the release of Metroid Prime: Federation Force, at the request of Nintendo of America. It was decided that the narrative would explore the relationship between Samus Aran and Sylux. Tanabe and his team at Nintendo perceived demand for an open-world Metroid game following the popularity of its 2017 game The Legend of Zelda: Breath of the Wild. As they found completely free exploration to have limited compatibility with Metroid gameplay, they conceived a freely explorable hub area and the Vi-O-La motorcycle as a compromise to add pacing variety.

Nintendo announced Metroid Prime 4 with a teaser trailer during the Nintendo Direct presentation at E3 2017, and announced that Retro Studios, who developed the previous main Prime games, would not be involved. In February 2018, Eurogamer reported that Prime 4 was being developed by Bandai Namco Studios in Japan and Singapore. The Bandai Singapore staff included former LucasArts staff who had worked on the canceled Star Wars 1313. Prime 4 did not appear at Nintendo's E3 2018 presentation; the Nintendo marketing manager Bill Trinen said they would share more when they "had something that would wow people". The Nintendo of America president, Reggie Fils-Aimé, said the following month that Prime 4 was "well into development" and "proceeding well".

=== Retro Studios version ===
In January 2019, the Nintendo EPD manager Shinya Takahashi announced that development had restarted under Retro with Tanabe remaining as producer. Takahashi said the previous studio had not met Nintendo's standards and that the decision to restart was not taken lightly. At the time of the transition, Nintendo's team observed changing player attitudes towards open-world games, but maintained the direction as development was already reset once and taking longer than planned. The team chose to ignore new developments in action and shooting games to prioritize appropriate pacing for an Adventure game.

In October 2020, Retro posted a job advertisement seeking storyboard artists to work on "emotional" and "interesting and innovative scenes that elevate the narrative". The Video Games Chronicle writer Andy Robinson took this as an indication of a more cinematic focus. The Nintendo developer Next Level Games, the third-party studio Virtuos, and other teams provided support. Tanabe also contributed material to the scan logs. Sound design was handled in-house at Retro with coordination from Nintendo's team, which composed the game's soundtrack.

Tanabe stated that due to his approaching retirement, he conceived the game as the first chapter in a new saga revolving around Sylux. While there were no plans for a sequel as of March 2026, he hoped that his protege Risa Tabata and Retro Studios would eventually follow-up and conclude this new story.

== Release and promotion ==
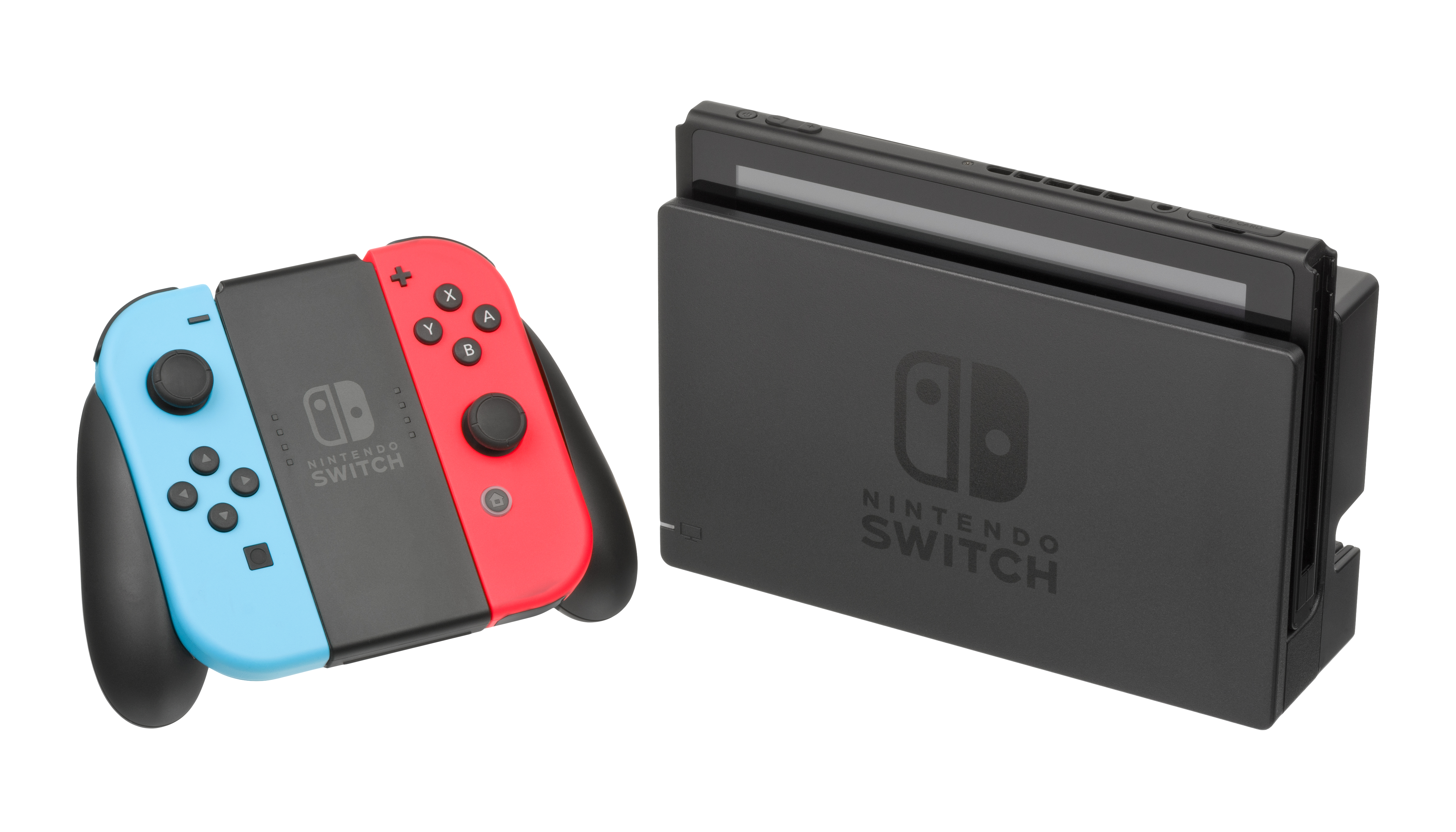
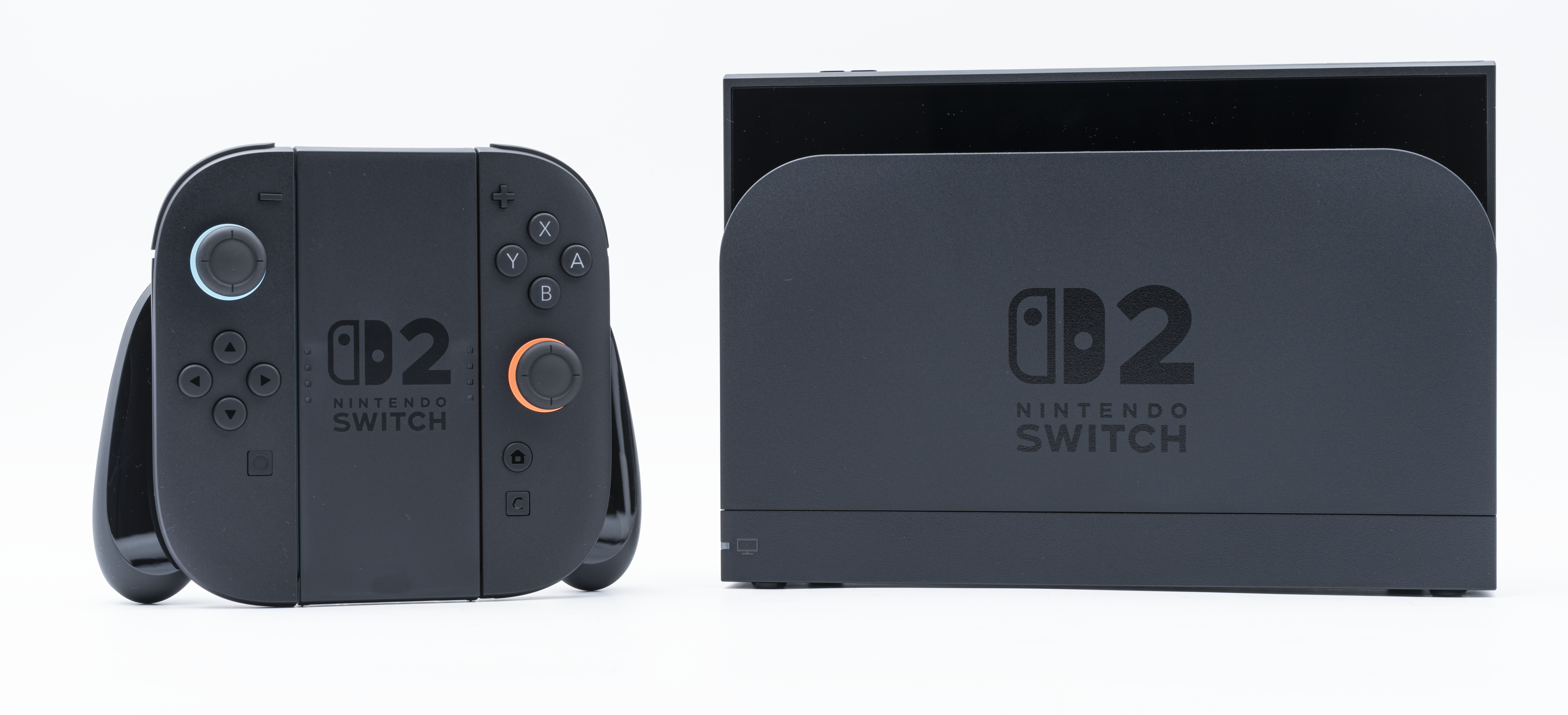
Metroid Prime 4: Beyond was originally announced for the Nintendo Switch (top). An enhanced version was also released for the Switch 2.

Nintendo released the first trailer on June 18, 2024, which revealed the title Beyond. The trailer showcased similar gameplay to previous Metroid Prime games, with Samus exiting her gunship, navigating a research facility using her morph ball and scanning abilities, encountering the bounty hunter Sylux who first appeared in Metroid Prime Hunters, and ending with an establishing shot of a forest world. Nintendo also announced that Metroid Prime 4: Beyond was scheduled for release in 2025.

Nintendo released a second trailer in a Direct presentation on March 27, 2025, introducing the forest planet Viewros setting, new enemies, the Lamorn race, and Samus's psychic powers. In a Direct presentation on April 2, Nintendo announced a version for Nintendo Switch 2, with enhanced visual resolution, the option to use 4K at 60 frames per second or 1080p at 120 frames per second, and optional mouse controls when using the Joy-Con 2 controllers. A 20-minute demo covering the opening level was made playable at Nintendo Switch 2 Experience events held worldwide between April and June, and showcased during a Nintendo Treehouse livestream. The demo was distributed for Switch 2 kiosks in Walmart and Target stores in the US in November.

On September 12, Nintendo released a trailer showcasing a desert environment and Samus's motorcycle, along with the release date, December 4, 2025. Amiibo figures were also announced. A trailer focusing on the Nintendo Switch 2 Edition was released on November 4, and a seven-minute trailer was released on November 14. On the day of the game's release, seven music tracks were released on the Nintendo Music app.

== Reception ==
=== Pre-release ===
At the Game Awards 2024, Beyond was nominated for Most Anticipated Game. In November 2025, media outlets were allowed to play a 90-minute demo, including the opening sequence and a section in the Fury Green area of Viewros. The presentation, puzzles and combat were praised. Ethan Van Allen of Game Informer felt Samus's new psychic powers were "a standout" and praised the mouse controls. Nintendo Life's Alex Olney felt they blended well with the gameplay and were "refreshingly different".

In Video Games Chronicle, Andy Robinson found the preview "solid, if not particularly surprising" and wrote that it featured an entertaining boss battle. IGN writer Logan Plant wrote that while Beyond "likely won't redefine Metroid in any meaningful way – or live up to the unrealistic hype built by nearly a decade of waiting", it features "classic Metroid Prime exploration and combat, an intriguing setup, gorgeous art direction, and great technical performance". Ari Notis of Polygon wrote that while Beyond was not a rehash of the original Metroid Prime games, with some tonal differences, it "plays the series' greatest hits".

Journalists criticized the non-player character Myles MacKenzie, feeling he detracted from the series' sense of isolation. Plant described the period spent with Myles as ranging from "mildly annoying to downright infuriating". Robinson said Myles made him worried that Beyond would not be the Metroid game he hoped for. Olney characterized Myles's dialogue as "sub-Marvel humor" and hoped he suffered "a painful, embarrassing death offscreen". Donaldson hoped the sequence was not indicative of the full game, and Notis said it was "hard to fully convey just how out of place Myles feels". Van Allen thought Myles provided enjoyable comic relief, but hoped that companions were used sparingly.

=== Critical response ===
Reception

Aggregate scores
Aggregator	Score
Metacritic	78/100 (NS2) (Note: Based on 126 reviews)
OpenCritic	78% recommend (Note: Based on 146 reviews)

Review scores
Publication	Score
Destructoid	7.5/10
Edge	4/10
Eurogamer	3/5
Famitsu	8/10, 9/10, 7/10, 8/10 (Note: Each of the four reviewers in Famitsu scored the game on a ten-point scale.)
Game Informer	8.75/10
GameSpot	8/10
GamesRadar+	3.5/5
Giant Bomb	5/5
HobbyConsolas	80%
IGN	8/10
Jeuxvideo.com	17/20
Nintendo Life	(NS) 8/10 (NS2) 9/10
PCMag	5/5
Retro Gamer	68%
Shacknews	9/10
TechRadar	4/5
The Guardian	4/5
Video Games Chronicle	3/5

Metroid Prime 4: Beyond received "generally favorable" reviews according to the review aggregator website Metacritic and received a "strong" approval from critics according to OpenCritic.

Writing for Nintendo Life, Ollie Reynolds described Beyond as "absolutely nothing like [he] imagined — and that's a good thing", and felt it deserved to be regarded as among the best Metroid games. Logan Plant of IGN said Beyond felt more like classic 3D Legend of Zelda games, though he did not see this as a negative, as Zelda and Metroid "shared a lot of the same DNA". Edge criticized its backtracking and final fetch quest, writing: "Nintendo games have tested our patience before, but rarely in so many ways at once, and not without a core brilliance that makes such transgressions forgivable."

Critics commented on the structure and pacing. Reynolds felt Beyond "manages to replicate that magical sense of discovery from the GameCube original while pushing the series in some incredible new directions". Plant said he "never felt truly lost", and felt this would help new players. Rhys Wood of TechRadar likewise felt some areas were too linear, though he did not believe this detracted from the overall quality. Plant praised the shifts between isolated exploration and sci-fi action setpieces, aided by the variety of environments, which he felt helped keep the experience fresh.

The Sol Valley hub area was a point of contention. Reynolds said it initially felt empty but became surprisingly interesting over time, and demonstrated that Metroid did not need to be "confined to dense corridors" to maintain a "classic Metroid experience". Plant felt Sol Valley was devoid of interest and served only to extend the runtime, and emphasized that it was the only location where green crystals required for progression can be collected. Wood echoed this criticism, writing that Sol Valley felt barren and lifeless. Darran Jones of Retro Gamer found the level design poor and "a world away from the tightness of the earlier games".

The atmosphere, art design, and narrative elements were generally praised. Reynolds said the art design was "astonishing", comparing it favorably to Metroid Prime Remastered, and found the soundtrack "incredible". Wood wrote that Beyond had a unique atmosphere comparable to the original Metroid Prime and praised the aesthetic of areas outside Sol Valley. Wood criticized the bosses and enemies as lacking variety, but felt this did not detract from the overall quality.

Despite pre-release apprehension, the companion characters received praise. Reynolds wrote that "none of them are even remotely as irritating as previews suggested", having developed an appreciation for them, and feeling they contributed greatly to the overall story. Wood found the troopers provided "great chemistry". Despite finding Myles MacKenzie annoying, he said they were less overbearing than he had feared and still allowed for long stretches of isolated exploration. Plant found their presence acceptably limited, noting that they had "mostly likeable personalities and provide a few highlights that give Prime 4 its own identity". Jones found them forgettable, Andy Robinson of Video Games Chronicle described their implementation as "clumsy", and Keza MacDonald of The Guardian wrote that "unfortunately they are all annoying".

The Amiibo functionality was criticized for locking certain features. The Samus Amiibo unlocks a radio feature for listening to a selection of the soundtrack in the desert, while the Vi-O-La Amiibo unlocks skins based on how far the player travels.

=== Sales ===
In its first week, Beyond was the third-bestselling game in the UK, behind EA Sports FC 26 and Mario Kart World. The Switch 2 version accounted for 83% of sales. In Japan, the Switch 2 version sold 21,415 physical copies in the first four days. In North America, the Switch 2 version reached number one on the Nintendo eShop chart. In February 2026, a Nintendo representative confirmed that Beyond had sold more than one million copies across both consoles.
