= SA-X =

- Metroid character
- SA-X in Metroid Fusion
- First appearance: Metroid Fusion (2002)
- Designed by: Yoshio Sakamoto; Katsuya Yamano

The SA-X is a fictional character and the main antagonist of the 2002 video game Metroid Fusion. It is a parasite that originally infected the protagonist, Samus Aran, as well as her Power Suit, before Samus was cured by injecting Metroid DNA into her. The SA-X later appears, having replicated her Power Suit, including all of her most powerful weapons from Super Metroid. It is pursuing Samus throughout the game, who is much weaker and thus must avoid it until she is able to fight back against the SA-X.

The SA-X was designed to mimic Samus' movements and actions, with designer Yoshio Sakamoto identifying such a concept as unsettling. The concept of being chased by the SA-X was reused in the video game Metroid Dread with the antagonists, the EMMI, as Sakamoto wanted to reproduce that tension.

The SA-X has been met with generally positive reception, praised as an iconic character as well as one of the scariest characters in video games. Her power, particularly in contrast with Samus', was met with praise, with critics identifying the chase scenes between the SA-X and Samus as the best moments in Metroid Fusion. The EMMI was compared negatively to the SA-X by critics, who found it to be a less effective execution of the idea.

== Concept and creation ==
The SA-X was created for Metroid Fusion by the game's director, Yoshio Sakamoto, who aimed to make the SA-X mimic Samus' movements and action, feeling that it was an unpleasant concept to have someone mimic someone. Enemy programmer Katsuya Yamano identified the SA-X as the thing he spent most of his time on. The SA-X was also designed to have all of Samus' equipment from Super Metroid, contrasting a defenseless Samus. Fusion's sequel, Metroid Dread, features robots called E.M.M.I. that hunt down Samus. Their concept directly comes from the SA-X, as Sakamoto wanted to recreate the tension the SA-X produced in another game. They specifically wanted "expand on the tension that players felt when being chased by the SA-X", by adding the chasing and hiding style of gameplay into "what is considered to be the normal Metroid gameplay".

== Appearances ==
The SA-X originally appeared in Metroid Fusion, having developed from an X parasite originally found on the planet SR388. It first infects both the protagonist Samus Aran and her bio-organic Power Suit on a Galactic Federation mission, causing her to nearly die until being saved by Metroid DNA and having most of her Power Suit surgically removed. The X parasite residing in her Power Suit remains eventually transforms into a replica of Samus, able to use the arsenal of weapons and upgrades she wielded in Super Metroid, while Samus herself is left relatively weakened and unable to survive the SA-X's ice weapons as it stalks Samus throughout the BSL Space Station. Samus later learns that there are multiple SA-Xes, and that the Galactic Federation wanted to weaponize them, causing her to plot to destroy the space station.

She does battle with the SA-X, which goes through multiple forms before being defeated and fleeing. Samus sets the space station to collide with SR388, fleeing to her ship before being attacked by an Omega Metroid. The SA-X appears and attacks the Omega Metroid, but is defeated, allowing Samus to absorb the SA-X and kill the Omega Metroid. She flies away with her ship as the space station collided with the planet, destroying them both.

== Reception ==
The SA-X has been generally well-received by critics, considered one of the best new villains of 2002 by Nintendo Power. Retro Gamer staff called her iconic, attributing her icon status to her overwhelming power and intimidation. Retro Gamer writer Darran Jones also noted her first appearance, where she looks straight at the player with her "cold, dead eyes", which they stated still makes their stomach "turn in terror". She has been identified as a particularly frightening encounter in video games, with GamesRadar+ writer Connor Sheridan finding her the "coolest part" of Metroid Fusion. Hardcore Gaming 101 writer Kurt Kalata considered the moments with the SA-X to be the best part of Metroid Fusion, though felt that the boss battle was too basic. GameSpot writer Jordan Ramée commented on SA-X being "[Samus] at her best", and how it reflected how Samus, now infused with Metroid DNA, was being hunted by herself, reflecting how she once hunted the Metroids to extinction. He praised the writers for creating a character so "chillingly horrifying" that they are still memorable years later.

VG247 writer Fran Ruiz compared SA-X to the titular antagonists of The Thing and The Terminator, as well as Nemesis T-Type from Resident Evil 3: Nemesis, all of whom stalk their respective protagonists. She felt that running and hiding from the SA-X was stressful, but that the final encounter feels "earned and empowering", saying that it is her "personal boogeyman to this day". Yahoo! News staff identified her as the most frightening stalker character in video games, feeling that it is the "real meat of the horror" in Fusion. Nintendo World Report writer James Dawson considered her the standout antagonist in Metroid, saying that encounters with her were among his "most memorable moments in gaming" from his childhood. He noted that his first encounter with it was the first time he felt helpless in a video game.

The SA-X has been compared to other characters in the Metroid series, including the EMMI from Metroid Dread, with the EMMI criticized as being an inconvenience compared to SA-X. Jordan Ramée felt that the EMMI was an evolution of the SA-X concept mechanically, but a step back thematically. He felt that revealing that the EMMI could be killed early in the game took away from its impact, noting that the SA-X being a "terrifying threat" is enhanced by being invulnerable to Samus until the end of the game. Kurt Kalata felt similarly, feeling that EMMI are an improvement mechanically, and while they created "some incredibly tense standoffs", the SA-X were more frightening. Nintendo Life writer Ollie Reynolds argued that Dark Samus, after SA-X's debut, felt redundant and less impactful due to SA-X's more compelling concept.
