= Metroid: Zero Mission =

2004 video game

- North American box art
- Developer: Nintendo R&D1
- Publisher: Nintendo
- Director: Yoshio Sakamoto
- Producer: Takehiro Izushi
- Designers: Takehiko Hosokawa; Masani Ueda; Ryuichi Nakada
- Artist: Hiroji Kiyotake
- Writer: Yoshio Sakamoto
- Composers: Kenji Yamamoto; Minako Hamano
- Series: Metroid
- Platform: Game Boy Advance
- Release: NA: February 9, 2004; AU: March 19, 2004; EU: April 8, 2004; JP: May 27, 2004
- Genre: Action-adventure
- Mode: Single-player

Metroid: Zero Mission (Note: Japanese: メトロイド ゼロミッション, Hepburn: Metoroido Zero Misshon) is a 2004 action-adventure game developed and published by Nintendo for the Game Boy Advance. It is a remake of the original Metroid (1986), with updated visuals and gameplay.

Like other Metroid games, the player controls the bounty hunter Samus Aran. Samus travels to the planet Zebes after learning that the Space Pirates are experimenting with Metroids, hostile parasitic creatures, which they plan to use to take over the universe. The gameplay focuses on exploration, with the player searching for power-ups to reach previously inaccessible areas. The remake adds items, additional areas, mini-bosses, difficulty levels and a rewritten story that explores Samus's past.

Zero Mission received praise for its new content, graphics, gameplay and improvements over the original, but criticism for its short length. Nintendo Power named it one of the best Nintendo games. It was named the best Game Boy Advance game by GameSpot and the ninth-best by IGN.

As of February 2025, Zero Mission had sold over 439,000 copies in the United States and 69,000 in Japan. It was rereleased on the Virtual Console service for Wii U and the Nintendo Classics service for Nintendo Switch.

== Gameplay ==
Samus faces off against Mother Brain. The scene from Metroid is shown on the left, while Metroid: Zero Mission is on the right.

Metroid: Zero Mission takes place on Planet Zebes, a large, open-ended world with areas connected by doors and elevators. The player controls Samus Aran as she travels through the planet's caverns and environments, hunting Space Pirates. Along the way, the player collects power-ups that enhance Samus's armor and weaponry, as well as grant her special abilities. These abilities allow Samus to access previously inaccessible areas, so that the game can be played linearly or non-linearly. For example, the player may come across caverns that bypass certain sections, a method termed sequence breaking. To save their progress, players can enter either Save Rooms or Samus's ship on Crateria. As a remake of Metroid, Metroid: Zero Mission's layout bears a resemblance to the original, and various powerups and items make reappearances from previous games in the series, with similar uses, effects, and appearances, but it adds items, areas, and mini-bosses, as well as a new area named Chozodia.

Zero Mission is the first Metroid game to include a sequence in which the player controls Samus without her Power Suit. In this sequence, Samus is more vulnerable to damage, must crawl through ducts on her hands and knees without her Morph Ball mode, and her only weapon is a weak pistol that briefly stuns enemies. Samus retains all energy tanks she acquired previously.

Completing the game unlocks an emulated version of the original Metroid. Zero Mission allows players to unlock the Metroid Fusion picture gallery by linking between Zero Mission and Fusion cartridges via the Game Boy Advance Game Link Cable.

== Plot ==
Space Pirates attack a Galactic Federation-owned space research vessel and seize samples of Metroid creatures. Dangerous floating organisms, Metroids can latch on to any organism and drain its life energy to kill it. The Space Pirates plan to replicate Metroids by exposing them to beta rays and use the Metroids as biological weapons to destroy all living beings that oppose them. While searching for the stolen Metroids, the Galactic Federation locates the Space Pirates' base of operations on the planet Zebes. The Federation assaults the planet, but the Pirates resist, forcing the Federation to retreat. As a last resort, the Federation decides to send a lone bounty hunter to penetrate the Pirates' base and destroy Mother Brain, the mechanical life-form that controls the Space Pirates' fortress and its defenses. Considered the greatest of all bounty hunters, Samus Aran is chosen for the mission.

Samus lands on the surface of Zebes and explores the planet, traveling through the planet's caverns. She comes across Kraid, an ally of the Space Pirates, and Ridley, the Space Pirates' commander, and defeats them both. Samus finds and destroys Mother Brain. While Samus leaves the planet in her ship, it is attacked by Space Pirates, causing it to crash back onto Zebes, near the Space Pirate Mothership. With both her ship and Power Suit destroyed, Samus infiltrates the Mothership, leading her to Chozodia, where a Chozo Statue offers her a trial. Upon passing the trial, Samus is rewarded with a new fully upgraded Power Suit. Continuing to explore the Mothership, Samus reaches the Mecha Ridley, a robot built in the likeness of Ridley. After defeating it, Samus escapes the planet using one of the Space Pirate's shuttles, while the Mothership self-destructs.

== Development ==
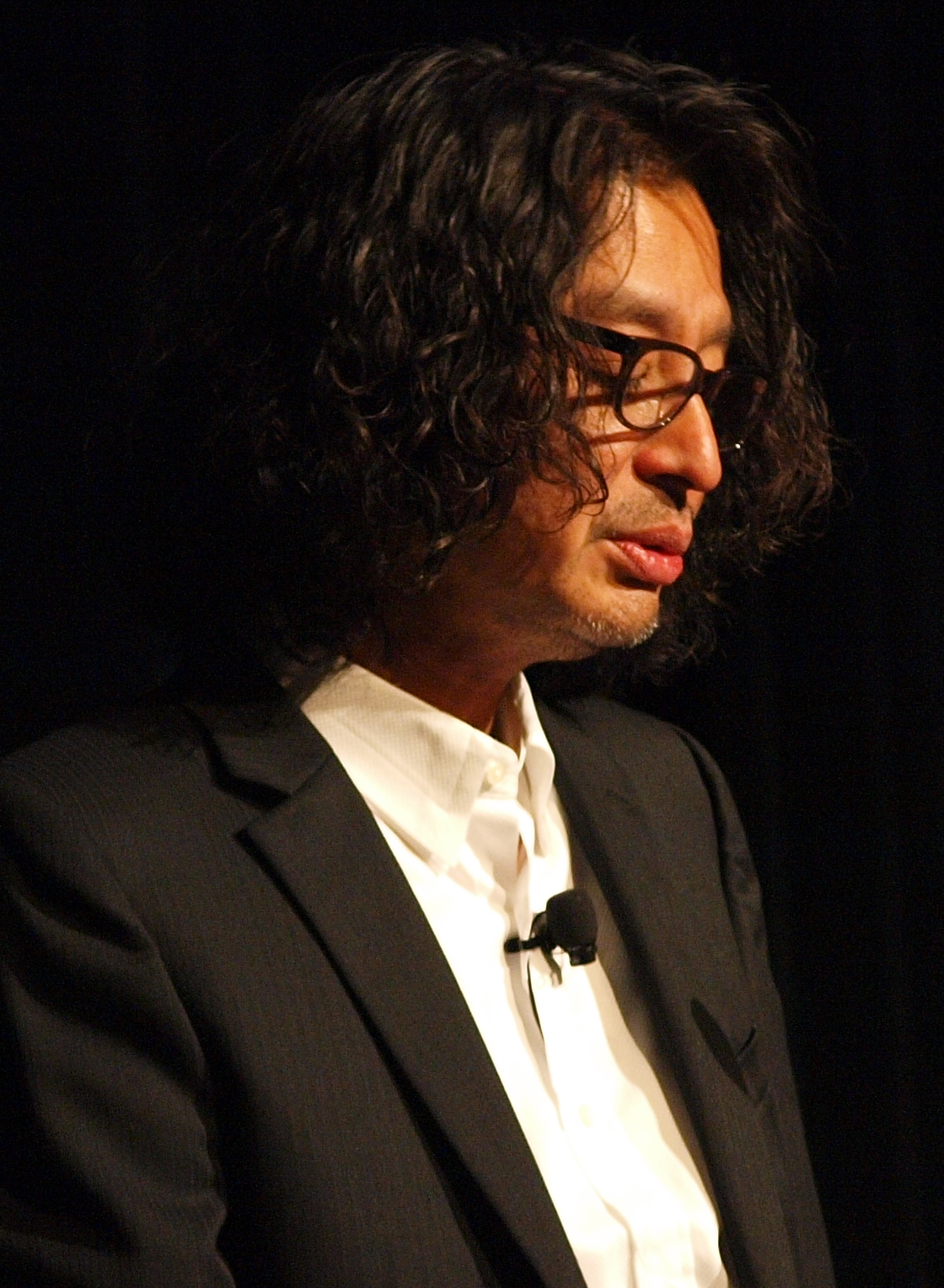
Yoshio Sakamoto in 2010

Metroid: Zero Mission was directed by Yoshio Sakamoto, who had worked on every Metroid game but Metroid II: Return of Samus (1991). He was the only member of the original Metroid (1986) team to work on Zero Mission. While working on the concept for the next Metroid game after Metroid Fusion (2002), one of the developers suggested porting Super Metroid (1994) to the Game Boy Advance, but Sakamoto decided to port the original Metroid instead. The development team decided to return to the roots of Metroid gameplay by creating a game based on the NES original. Sakamoto, noting that Fusion's gameplay and structure were drastically different from previous games, wanted to "show people who had never played a Metroid game prior to Fusion, the roots of the Metroid franchise, that this is what Metroid is, this is the style of gameplay that Metroid sprang from [...] at the same time, retell the story of Samus's original mission".

The team originally used a cuter visual style to evoke the original NES graphics, but reverted to a more realistic style after Nintendo of America said it would harm sales. One of the biggest challenges that the developers faced was adding enough elements to make Zero Mission feel new, while keeping the spirit of the original Metroid. Zero Mission uses a rebuilt version of the game engine used for Fusion. Metroid Fusion had offered connectivity with Metroid Prime on the GameCube, and Zero Mission was planned to offer similar functionality with Metroid Prime 2: Echoes, but these plans fell through. Sakamoto explained that because there was not enough development time for Zero Mission, compounded by the fact that both of their release dates were too far apart, the team was prevented from doing so. They did, however, manage to include the ability for Fusion to connect with Zero Mission.

Zero Mission introduces cinematics to push the story forward. Sakamoto believed in the importance of having a story to complement a game. He found it particularly difficult to convey the plot in a way that the player can understand, because of the sparse use of dialogue in the Metroid series. The story for Metroid: Zero Mission was rewritten to explore Samus Aran's backstory more than in the original Metroid. Cinematics are used to show Samus' memories to move the story forward and to keep the plot open for interpretation. Sakamoto said this was intended to expand the original story while retaining some mystery. The game is the first in the series to let the player choose a difficulty level at the start; each of three levels varies in the amount of damage caused by enemies with the third option only unlocked after finishing the campaign once. The battle with Mother Brain marked the end of the original Metroid, but Zero Mission offers an extra story segment featuring Samus in her blue Zero Suit.

=== Release ===
Nintendo revealed Metroid: Zero Mission at the E3 convention in 2003. It was released in North America on February 9, 2004, in Australia on March 19, in Europe on April 8, and in Japan on May 27. Zero Mission was the best-selling Game Boy Advance game in the United States in its debut month, selling 151,807 units, and was the third-bestselling game across all video game systems in that month. By May, sales dropped to seventh among Game Boy Advance games, with 31,619 copies sold and $938,681 in revenue. By February 2005, it had sold over 439,000 units in the United States and 69,000 in Japan. Zero Mission was released on the Wii U Virtual Console in Japan on June 19, 2014. This was followed by the release in Europe on March 12, 2015, and in North America on January 14, 2016. It was released for the Nintendo Classics service for Nintendo Switch on June 19, 2024.

== Reception ==
Reception

Aggregate scores
Aggregator	Score
GameRankings	90.19%
Metacritic	89/100

Review scores
Publication	Score
1Up.com	A
Eurogamer	9/10
Famitsu	34/40
Game Informer	9.5/10
GamePro	5/5
GameSpot	8.5/10
GameSpy	4/5
GamesRadar+	89%
GameZone	9/10
IGN	9/10
Nintendo World Report	9.5/10
X-Play	5/5

Metroid: Zero Mission received "generally favorable reviews", according to Metacritic. Several reviews named it one of the best Game Boy Advance games. The Japanese magazine Famitsu gave it a score of 34 out of 40. X-Play and GamePro enjoyed the game; X-Play said it was "perfect for blasting space pirates on the go", and GamePro was "constantly surprised" by it. GameZone said it surpassed the "style and addictive action" of Metroid Fusion. Nintendo World Report called the game a masterpiece and the perfect example of a Metroid game, saying it mixed all the best elements from the other games and layered them on top of the original Metroid level design and concepts. Eurogamer appreciated every minute of the game and said it was one of the best games for the Game Boy Advance.

A number of reviews were pleased with the content added to Zero Mission. Game Informer appreciated the new material, and believed that fans of the Metroid series would "absolutely adore" Zero Mission, which they considered one of the greatest games in history. 1UP.com considered Zero Mission one of the "most ambitious, comprehensive and successful" remakes for a game such as Metroid, feeling it expanded on its source material with refined control, gameplay ideas retrofitted from its sequels, new plot elements for later games, and innovations which add complexity to the series.

Criticism focused on the short length. IGN felt Zero Mission said it "looks, sounds, and plays absolutely wonderfully", but was too short and too easy. Eurogamer was also critical of the length. GamesRadar liked the game but felt it should have been longer. GameSpot was disappointed with the length, but blamed the captivating quality that compelled them to complete the game in a few sittings. GameSpy said Zero Mission was "stale" and that players less familiar with Metroid games would get more enjoyment from it.

Nintendo Power named Zero Mission the 46th-best game for any Nintendo system in 2006. In their March 2010 issue, they named Zero Mission the eighth-best game released on a Nintendo console in 2010s. Zero Mission was voted IGN's Game Boy Advance Game of the Month for February 2004, and IGN staff named it the best Game Boy adventure game of 2004 and the ninth-best Game Boy Advance Game. GameSpot also named it the best Game Boy Advance game of February 2004, and nominated it for the year-end "Best Game Boy Advance Game" award. Electronic Gaming Monthly also named it the best handheld game of 2004. During the 8th Annual Interactive Achievement Awards, the Academy of Interactive Arts & Sciences named Zero Mission "Handheld Game of the Year". In 2009, Official Nintendo Magazine ranked the 94th-best Nintendo game. Nintendo Power ranked it the best Game Boy Advance game in its August 2011 issue. In 2020, IGN named Zero Mission the fifth-greatest video game remake.
