= Mother Brain =

Video game villain

- Metroid character
- Mother Brain in Metroid: Zero Mission
- First appearance: Metroid (1986)
- Created by: Gunpei Yokoi
- Designed by: Yoshio Sakamoto
- Voiced by: Levi Stubbs (Captain N: The Game Master)

In-universe information
- Species: Cybernetic supercomputer (instilled with human DNA)

Mother Brain (Japanese: マザーブレイン, Hepburn: Mazā Burein) is a character in the Metroid video game series by Nintendo. She is the main antagonist of Metroid (1986) and Super Metroid (1994).

Mother Brain has been killed multiple times by the protagonist, Samus Aran. Her Super Metroid design was originally milder than its final version, resembling an "old lady living in an apartment complex" when designed by Toru Osawa. This design was altered by Tomomi Yamane, who gave her an overall more monstrous appearance. She takes the form of a large brain that sits within a jar, from which she controls the Space Pirates on the fictional planet Zebes. Since Super Metroid (1994), she has had a single large eye.

Mother Brain has made several appearances in other media, including the animated series Captain N: The Game Master. Mother Brain was named the 9th-best video game villain by IGN and the 36th-best by the Guinness World Records Gamer's Edition.

== Concept and characteristics ==
Mother Brain is depicted as a large brain with cybernetic spikes, usually contained in a glass tube which Samus must break to attack it, but in the Super NES video game Super Metroid, she is seen in a bipedal form. When designing the bipedal version of Mother Brain for Super Metroid, Toru Osawa described what he wanted her to look like as being an "old lady living in my apartment complex". Tomomi Yamane added to the design, giving her dripping saliva, foul breath, and a filthy appearance.

== Appearances ==
Mother Brain serves as the central antagonist in the original Metroid, utilizing the Metroid species as a weapon. After being defeated by Samus, she is rebuilt and continues her activities in Super Metroid. At the end of Super Metroid, she reveals a new, much larger form that nearly kills Samus, but a Metroid which imprinted on Samus at the end of Metroid II sacrifices its life to protect her. The Metroid drains energy from Mother Brain and gives it to Samus, which she uses to defeat Mother Brain and escape. In Metroid Prime 3: Corruption, it is revealed that the Galactic Federation had constructed biomechanical supercomputers called Auroras and that there were plans for a "Future Aurora Complex", which appears to be Mother Brain.

In Metroid: Other M, the scene of Mother Brain destroying the baby Metroid is reenacted in an FMV cutscene. The primary antagonist of Other M, MB, is an android partially constructed from Mother Brain's DNA, hence the initialism (which is shared with its human matrix, Madeline Bergman, from whom Mother Brain was originally grown).

Mother Brain appears as a summonable helper character ("Assist Trophy") in Super Smash Bros. for Nintendo 3DS and Wii U and Super Smash Bros. Ultimate. A reimagining of the character also appears in Captain N: The Game Master and its related comic book media, where she serves as the series' primary antagonist and. In the series, she was voiced by American singer Levi Stubbs.

== Reception ==
Mother Brain was named the ninth-best video game villain by IGN and the 36th-best by the Guinness World Records Gamer's Edition. In particular, the boss fight against her in Super Metroid has been well-received, with 1UP.com staff finding it one of the most emotionally moving battles in video games and GameSpy writer Ryan Scott calling it "jaw-dropping". Boston Phoenix editors Ryan Stewart and Mitch Krpata named Mother Brain the fourth-greatest boss in video game history, as of 2009, stating that while she had triumphant roles in Metroid and Captain N, she did not come into her own until Super Metroid. They cited the overall quality of the ending for why she was so notable in this role. Nintendo Life writer Nile Bowie considered her one of Nintendo's most iconic villains, discussing how difficult the fight with her was in the Metroid remake Zero Mission. He remarked about how much harder he found it, noting that YouTube comments on a video of the boss fight affirmed how he felt about the difficulty. He felt that the Zero Mission version of this fight was easier in some ways and harder in others, noting improved controls as a benefit, while the speed of the fight and comparatively constrained space a detriment.
