= Nintendo Comics System =

Series of comic books

- Cover of the first issue

The Nintendo Comics System was a series of comic books published by Valiant Comics in 1990 and 1991. It was part of a licensing deal with Nintendo, featuring characters from their video games and the cartoons based on them.

== The comics ==
Valiant Comics's Nintendo Comics System series of comic books was published between 1990 and 1991. The comics are based upon Nintendo video game and television intellectual property from Super Mario Bros., Game Boy, The Legend of Zelda, Captain N: The Game Master, Metroid, and Punch-Out!!.

Valiant's Super Mario Bros. comic books are based on the three main Mario games on the Nintendo Entertainment System, as well as The Super Mario Bros. Super Show!. It features the five main characters from the games and cartoon: Mario, Luigi, Princess Toadstool (as the name Peach was not known in America at the time until Yoshi's Safari in 1993), Toad, and Bowser as "King Koopa" (the Super Show version of himself). Wart (the main villain from Super Mario Bros. 2), the Koopalings, and the viruses from Dr. Mario also make minor appearances. New characters are also featured for these comics, including: Stanley the Talking Fish, an annoying fish who often pesters Mario about his dating problems; King Toadstool, the Princess' father, who is not very intelligent; and Wooster, the king's much smarter and more sensible advisor. One particular character created for the comics is Dirk Drain-Head, a comic book superhero favored by Mario and all of Bowser's minions, and disliked by most other characters. Mario's line was renewed for 1991, in which he has two different books: Super Mario Bros. and Adventures of the Super Mario Bros.

The stand-alone Game Boy comic books, despite having that title, are based solely on Super Mario Land since it was the only Game Boy adventure game around at the time. It ended at four issues. The stories feature an original character named Herman Smirch, a quasi-hero of the storyline. He is an ill-willed character whom Tatanga—the villain of source game—could easily hypnotize into doing his bidding due to the bitterness in the man's cynical soul. In each issue, Smirch releases Tatanga and his minions into the real world, and a child then releases a tiny Mario to battle them.

The Legend of Zelda is based on the two Zelda games released on the NES at the time as well as the animated series that aired alongside on The Super Mario Bros. Super Show.

Captain N: The Game Master is based on the animated series of the same name but with some major differences. All third-party characters are excluded due to Valiant not licensing them from Capcom and Konami as the creators of the animated series had done, but the characters made for the show (Kevin Keene, Princess Lana, Duke, and King Charles), as well as Pit, remain. Simon Belmont and Mega Man are replaced by Samus Aran, the Metroid heroine who does not appear in the cartoon, and Mother Brain's second-in-command is Uranos, the demigod from Kid Icarus. For unexplained reasons, Pit's toga is bleached yellow, and in most of the stories, Lana's dress is purple. She, however, has a weapon, which is the scepter she had in concept art but never featured on the show. The comics retain some of the creative license taken by the cartoon's creators for elements of the original game (i.e., Metroid being a place, King Hippo being blue, and Mother Brain's appearance).

Metroid and Punch-Out!! appear as stories in the graphic novel-like issues, and do not have their own books. Samus is portrayed as self-serving and interested in Captain N.

== See also ==
- Nintendo gamebooks
- Valiant Comics
