= Metroid Fusion =

2002 video game

- North American box art
- Developer: Nintendo R&D1
- Publisher: Nintendo
- Directors: Yoshio Sakamoto; Takehiko Hosokawa
- Producer: Takehiro Izushi
- Designers: Tomoyoshi Yamane; Takehiko Hosokawa
- Programmer: Katsuya Yamano
- Artist: Tomoyoshi Yamane
- Writer: Yoshio Sakamoto
- Composers: Minako Hamano; Akira Fujiwara
- Series: Metroid
- Platform: Game Boy Advance
- Release: NA: November 18, 2002; EU: November 22, 2002; AU: November 29, 2002; JP: February 14, 2003
- Genre: Action-adventure
- Mode: Single-player

Metroid Fusion (Note: Japanese: メトロイドフュージョン, Hepburn: Metoroido Fyūjon) (Note: Also known as Metroid 4, a name used in the game's opening cutscene.) is a 2002 action-adventure game developed and published by Nintendo for the Game Boy Advance. It is the fourth main Metroid game. Players control the bounty hunter Samus Aran, who investigates a space station infected with shapeshifting parasites known as X. Along with the GameCube game Metroid Prime, Fusion marked the return of the Metroid series after an eight-year hiatus following Super Metroid (1994).

Like previous Metroid games, Fusion is a side-scrolling game with platform jumping, shooting, and puzzle elements. It introduces mission-based progression that guides the player through certain areas. Fusion can be linked to Prime using the GameCube–Game Boy Advance link cable to unlock additional content for Prime.

Fusion was acclaimed for its gameplay, controls, graphics and music, though its shorter length and greater linearity received criticism. It received awards including "Handheld Game of the Year" from the Academy of Interactive Arts & Sciences, "Best Game Boy Advance Adventure Game" from IGN, and "Best Action Game on Game Boy Advance" from GameSpot. It was rereleased on the Nintendo 3DS's Virtual Console in 2011 as part of the 3DS Ambassador Program, the Wii U's Virtual Console in 2014, and the Nintendo Classics service in 2023. A sequel, Metroid Dread, was released in 2021 for the Nintendo Switch.

== Gameplay ==
Samus Aran fights the Nightmare boss in its Core-X form.

Metroid Fusion is an action-adventure game in which the player controls Samus Aran. Like previous games in the series, Fusion is set in a large open-ended world with elevators that connect regions, which each in turn contains rooms separated by doors. Samus opens most doors by shooting at them, while some only open after she reaches a certain point. Fusion is more linear than other Metroid games due to its focus on storyline; for example, Fusion introduces Navigation Rooms, which tell the player where to go.

The gameplay involves solving puzzles to uncover secrets, platform jumping, shooting enemies, and searching for power-ups that allow Samus to reach new areas. Samus can absorb X Parasites, which restore health, missiles, and bombs. Power-ups are obtained by downloading them in Data Rooms or absorbing a Core-X, which appears after defeating a boss. New features include the ability to grab ledges and climb ladders.

The player can use the GameCube–Game Boy Advance link cable to connect to Fusion and unlock features in the GameCube game Metroid Prime. After completing Prime, they can unlock Samus's Fusion Suit, and after completing Fusion, they can unlock an emulated version of the first Metroid game. In Metroid: Zero Mission (2004), players can connect to Fusion using the Game Boy Advance Game Link Cable to unlock a Fusion picture gallery, which includes its ending images.

== Plot ==
Bounty hunter Samus Aran explores the surface of the planet SR388 with a survey crew from Biologic Space Laboratories (BSL). She is attacked by parasitic organisms known as X. On returning to the BSL station, Samus loses consciousness, and her ship crashes. The BSL ship she was escorting recovers her and transfers her to a Galactic Federation hospital for medical treatment, where it is discovered the X infected Samus' central nervous system. They cure her with a vaccine made from cells taken from the infant Metroid that Samus adopted on SR388. The vaccine gives her the ability to absorb the X nuclei for nourishment, but burdens her with the Metroids' vulnerability to cold. Portions of Samus's infected Power Suit are sent to the BSL station for examination, although the suit was too integrated with her body to remove entirely while unconscious.

After Samus recovers, she is sent to investigate an explosion at the BSL station. The mission is overseen by her new gunship's computer, whom Samus nicknames "Adam" after her former commanding officer, Adam Malkovich. Samus learns that the X parasites can replicate their hosts' appearances, and that the X have infected the station with the help of the SA-X, an X parasite mimicking Samus at full power.

Samus avoids the SA-X and explores the space station, defeating larger creatures infected by the X to recover her abilities. She discovers a restricted lab containing Metroids, and the SA-X sets off the labs' auto-destruct sequence while attacking the released Metroids, who also devour the SA-X. Samus escapes, but the lab is destroyed. Adam berates Samus for ignoring orders and admits that the Federation was secretly using the lab to breed Metroids. It also reveals that the SA-X has asexually reproduced, subsequently cloning itself. Adam then warns Samus that she must escape from the station immediately.

While escaping, Samus kills an X parasite mimicking Ridley, and then arrives at the Sector 1 navigation room, where Adam orders Samus to leave the rest of the investigation to the Federation, which plans to capture SA-X for military purposes. This infuriates Samus, who knows that the X would infect the Federation troops and absorb their spacefaring knowledge to conquer the universe, and states her intention to destroy the station. Although the computer initially stops Samus by locking the doors in the navigation room, she then calls it "Adam", and reveals that Adam died saving her life. (Note: As depicted in Metroid: Other M.) Adam gives in and recommends altering the station's propulsion to crash into SR388, which would vaporize the X population. Samus realizes that the computer is the consciousness of Adam, uploaded after his death. En route to initiate the propulsion sequence, an SA-X confronts Samus, but she defeats it and sets the station on a collision course with SR388. As Samus prepares to leave, she is attacked by an Omega Metroid. The SA-X appears and attacks it, but is destroyed; Samus absorbs its nucleus and uses her newly restored Ice Beam to destroy the Omega Metroid. Her ship arrives, piloted by creatures Samus rescued from the station's Habitation Deck. They escape before the station crashes into the planet, destroying it.

== Development ==
Image from an early version presented at E3 2001

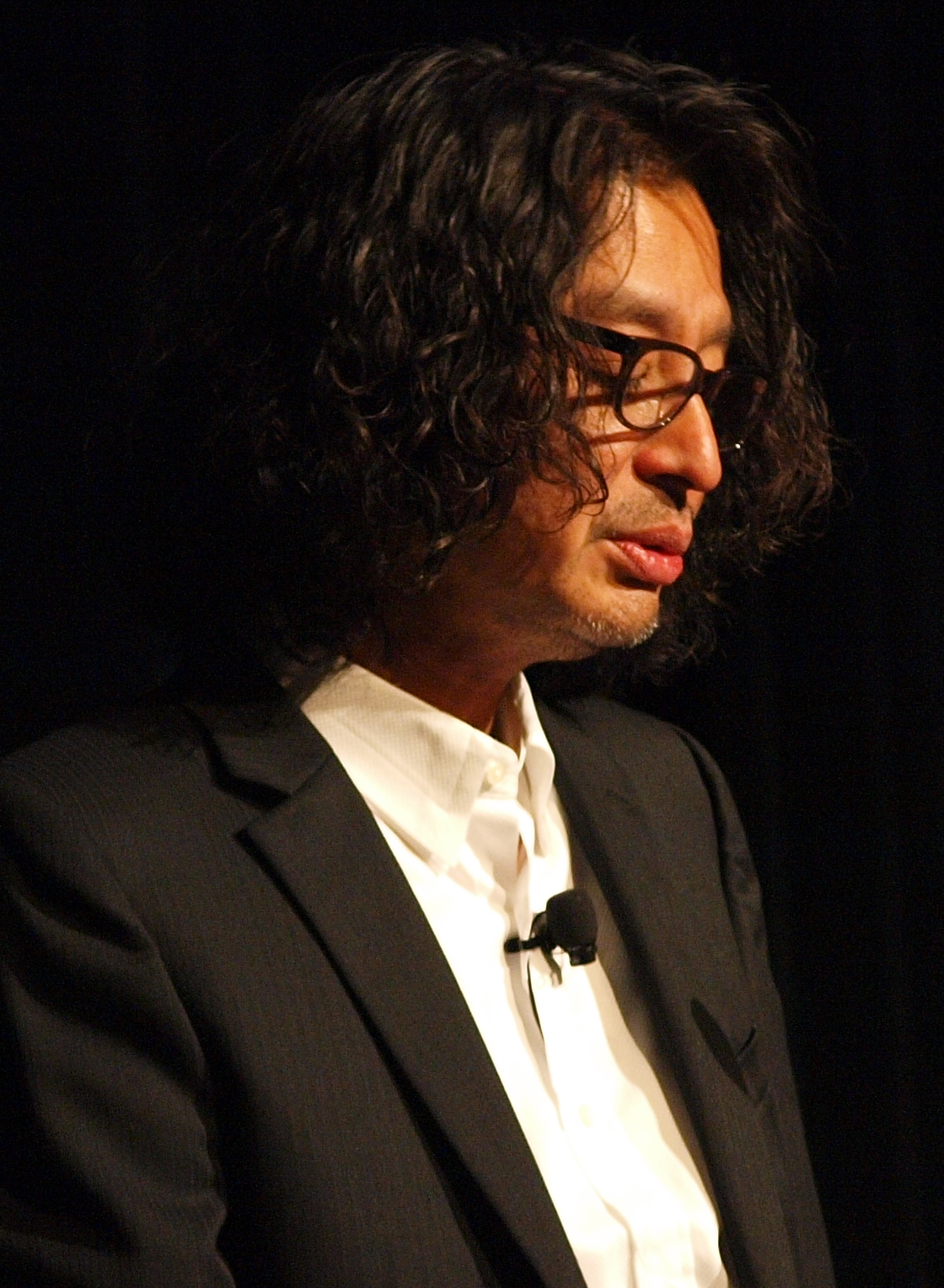
Sakamoto in 2010

Nintendo confirmed a Metroid game for the Game Boy Advance in March 2001, and showed early footage at the 2001 E3 convention under the name Metroid IV. The footage showed Samus in a dark suit, running on walls and ceilings, with simpler, more "Game Boy Color-like" graphics. IGN wrote that the video was disappointing, describing it as "dark" and "muddy". At E3 2002, Nintendo demonstrated the game again, now under the title Metroid Fusion, with updated graphics. IGN awarded Metroid Fusion Best of Show and Best Action Game.

Metroid Fusion was developed by Nintendo Research & Development 1 (R&D1), the same team that created the 1994 Super Nintendo game Super Metroid. The gameplay, screen layout, and controls mimic those of Super Metroid, with enhancements. The story is revealed through text and close-ups. It was written and directed by the series designer, Yoshio Sakamoto, and produced by Takehiro Izushi.

Sakamoto decided to create an original story instead of remaking a Metroid game because he wanted to do "something really unprecedented", and looked forward to the response. Fusion introduces gameplay mechanics such as a more direct, almost mission-based structure that supports the player to explore areas. Objectives are also flexible in how they can be completed, acting "more as a guide for what the player should do instead of giving a completely blank map and saying 'Here you go, figure out what to do and how to do it'".

According to the lead programmer, Katsuya Yamano, Nintendo R&D1 did not consult previous Metroid games for programming techniques, and instead used their 2001 game Wario Land 4 as a reference. Samus's suit design was revamped; the canonical explanation is that this was because an X Parasite had attacked Samus and made her lose all her abilities. Missiles were expanded with two "upgrades", much like the various beam upgrades: the Ice Missile which has a similar effect to the Ice Beam, and the Diffusion Missile which greatly increases the blast radius. Other minor abilities were added to Fusion, such as climbing walls and ceilings. The health and missile drops are replaced by X Parasites released after defeating enemies.

The music was composed by Minako Hamano and Akira Fujiwara. According to Hamano, Sakamoto wanted her to create music in accordance with Adam's dialogue. Hamano aimed for "serious, ambient music rather than melody" because she did not want the exploration themes to be "annoying". She also rearranged jingles from Super Metroid for Fusion. As Nintendo of America wanted the developers to look for "Hollywood-like" voice actors, Hamano added a voice of an announcer. The developers planned to feature voice acting, but the voices were only used for warning announcements due to ROM cartridge limitations.

== Release ==
Metroid Fusion was released in North America on November 18, 2002, in Europe on November 22, in Australia on November 29, in Japan on February 14, 2003, and in China on March 2, 2006. Along with the GameCube game Metroid Prime, released on the same day in North America, it marked the return of Metroid after eight years. A soundtrack album, Metroid Prime & Fusion Original Soundtracks, was published by Scitron on June 18, 2003. The second disc contains tracks from Fusion and an additional track arranged by Shinji Hosoe.

Metroid Fusion was released on the Nintendo 3DS Virtual Console in December 2011 as part of the "3DS Ambassadors" program, one of ten Game Boy Advance games for those who purchased their 3DS consoles before a price drop. Metroid Fusion was among the first three Game Boy Advance games to be released on the Wii U Virtual Console in April 2014. It was released on the Nintendo Classics service in March 2023. A sequel, Metroid Dread, was released in 2021 for the Nintendo Switch.

== Reception ==
Reception

Aggregate scores
| Aggregator | Score |
|---|---|
| GameRankings | 91.23% |
| Metacritic | 92/100 |

Review scores
| Publication | Score |
|---|---|
| Electronic Gaming Monthly | 9.5/10, 9.5/10, 9/10 |
| Eurogamer | 9/10 |
| Famitsu | 34/40 |
| Game Informer | 10/10 |
| GamePro | 4.5/5 |
| GameSpot | 8.6/10 |
| GameSpy | 88% |
| GamesRadar+ | 85% |
| GameZone | 9.5/10 |
| IGN | 9.5/10 |
| Nintendo World Report | 9.5/10 |
| Play | 5/5 |
| X-Play | 5/5 |

Fusion received "universal acclaim" according to review aggregator platform Metacritic. The Japanese magazine Famitsu gave it 34 out of 40. X-Play said it was a "pleasure to play", and praised its "beautiful" graphics and audio. IGN praised it as an "outstanding achievement on the Game Boy Advance". GamesRadar and GamePro felt it was too short, but "love[d] every minute of it", finding the hidden secrets and new power-ups "sublimely ingenious". GameSpot was disappointed that the game ended so soon, but said that Metroid fans would enjoy it. Nintendo World Report and Eurogamer called it the best 2D Metroid game and the best Game Boy Advance game so far. Game Informer agreed, describing it as "everything you could want from a Game Boy Advance game" from beginning to end, giving it a perfect review score. Play described it as a "magnified, modified, and improved" version of everything great from Metroid and Super Metroid.

GameSpot thought that Fusion offered Super Metroid's best qualities packaged in a new adventure. Scott Pelland of Nintendo Power heralded it as a return to the classic Metroid action gameplay. The "perfect" controls were praised by Electronic Gaming Monthly. Fusion did not feel new to GameSpy, which complained that even the final enemy encounter draws heavy inspiration from Super Metroid. GameZone felt that the small screen of the Game Boy Advance was a poor environment in which to play Fusion, but they found it an exciting game.

Fusion received several accolades. It was awarded "Handheld Game of the Year" by the Academy of Interactive Arts & Sciences at the 6th Annual Interactive Achievement Awards. It was also chosen as "Best Game Boy Advance Adventure Game" by IGN and "Best Action Game on Game Boy Advance" by GameSpot, which had named it the handheld's best game of November 2002 earlier in the year. It was a runner-up for GameSpot's annual "Best Sound", "Best Graphics", "Best Story" and overall "Game of the Year" awards among Game Boy Advance games. In 2009, Official Nintendo Magazine called Fusion "sleek, slick and perfectly formed", ranking it the 62nd-best Nintendo game.

=== Sales ===
Fusion sold over 1.6 million copies worldwide. In its debut week, it sold more than 100,000 units in North America. It finished the month of November 2002 with 199,723 copies sold in the United States alone, for total revenues of US$5,590,768, making it the third best-selling Game Boy Advance game that month, and the tenth best-selling game across all platforms. It sold 940,000 copies by August 2006, with revenues of US$27 million. During the period between January 2000 and August 2006, in the United States it was the twenty-first highest-selling game for the Game Boy Advance, Nintendo DS or PlayStation Portable. As of November 2004, Fusion had sold 180,000 copies in Japan.
