= Metroid II: Return of Samus =

1991 video game

- European box art
- Developer: Nintendo R&D1
- Publisher: Nintendo
- Directors: Hiroji Kiyotake; Hiroyuki Kimura
- Producer: Gunpei Yokoi
- Designer: Makoto Kano
- Programmers: Takahiro Harada; Masaru Yamamaka; Masao Yamamoto; Isao Hirano
- Composer: Ryoji Yoshitomi
- Series: Metroid
- Platform: Game Boy
- Release: NA: November 1991; JP: January 21, 1992; EU: May 21, 1992
- Genre: Action-adventure
- Mode: Single-player

Metroid II: Return of Samus (Note: Japanese: メトロイドII RETURN OF SAMUS, Hepburn: Metoroido Tsū Ritān Obu Samusu) is a 1991 action-adventure game developed and published by Nintendo for the Game Boy. The first Metroid game for a handheld game console, it was released in North America in November 1991 and in Japan and Europe in 1992. It follows the bounty hunter Samus Aran on her mission to eradicate the Metroids from their home planet, SR388, before the Space Pirates can obtain them. Players must find and exterminate the Metroids to progress.

Like the original Metroid, released in 1986 for the Nintendo Entertainment System, Metroid II was developed by Nintendo Research & Development 1 and produced by Gunpei Yokoi. It introduced several features that became staples of the series, including Samus's Space Jump, Spazer Beam and the Spider Ball, and round-shouldered Varia Suit.

Metroid II received positive reviews, with praise for its story, setting, and improved gameplay, but was criticized for its graphics and audio. By late 2003, it had sold 1.72 million copies worldwide. It was rereleased on the Nintendo 3DS Virtual Console service in 2011 and on the Nintendo Classics service in February 2023.

A sequel, Super Metroid, was released for the Super Nintendo Entertainment System in 1994, and a remake, Metroid: Samus Returns, was released for the Nintendo 3DS in 2017. An unofficial remake, AM2R, was released in 2016 for Windows.

== Gameplay ==
Samus enters the caverns of the planet SR388. The figures on the bottom of the screen indicate her energy, stock of missiles, and the remaining number of Metroids she must eliminate.

Metroid II is an action-adventure side-scroller game in which the player controls the protagonist Samus Aran on the fictional planet SR388. Players advance through the game by using Samus' weapons to kill a fixed number (47) of Metroid creatures. The player is given a detector that displays the number of Metroids remaining in the area. Once all the creatures are eliminated, an earthquake occurs and the planet's lava levels decrease, allowing Samus to travel deeper through its tunnels. The Metroid creatures are encountered in different evolution stages of their development cycle: original, Alpha, Gamma, Zeta and Omega. The more developed the organism is, the stronger its attack. Metroid II features save modules located around the planet, which allow players to save their progress and continue in another session.

The game features two weapons new to the Metroid series: the tri-splitting Spazer Laser Beam, and the Plasma Beam, which passes through enemies when shot. Samus can only equip one beam at a time, but she can switch between them by returning to where they are first found. Metroid II features the Space Jump, a new suit enhancement that allows Samus to jump infinitely and access otherwise unreachable areas. The game also sees the return of Samus' Morph Ball, a mode in which she curls up into a ball to travel through small tunnels. In addition, the game is the first in the series to feature the Spider Ball and Spring Ball. The Spider Ball allows Samus to climb most walls or ceilings, giving her freedom to explore both the surfaces and ceilings of caverns, and the Spring Ball gives Samus the ability to jump while curled up into a ball in the Morph Ball form.

== Plot ==
In the first Metroid, Samus Aran foiled the Space Pirates' plans to use the newly discovered lifeform known as Metroids. Some time later, the Galactic Federation resolved to ensure that the Metroids' power could never again be used by the Pirates, and sent several teams to the Metroid's home planet SR388 to destroy the species. When the teams disappear, the Galactic Federation contracts Samus to finish the mission.

Samus hunts and kills the Metroids one by one. Each exhibits unique mutations: the Metroids grow from small jellyfish-like creatures into large, hovering lizard-like beasts. After destroying most of the planet's Metroids, Samus kills the Queen Metroid.

Returning to her ship, Samus finds a Metroid egg. A Metroid hatchling emerges and imprints onto Samus, thinking that she is its mother. Unable to commit to her mission of extermination, Samus spares its life. She exits the tunnels while the Metroid helps clear the way. Reaching the planet's surface, Samus and the infant Metroid board the ship together.

== Development ==
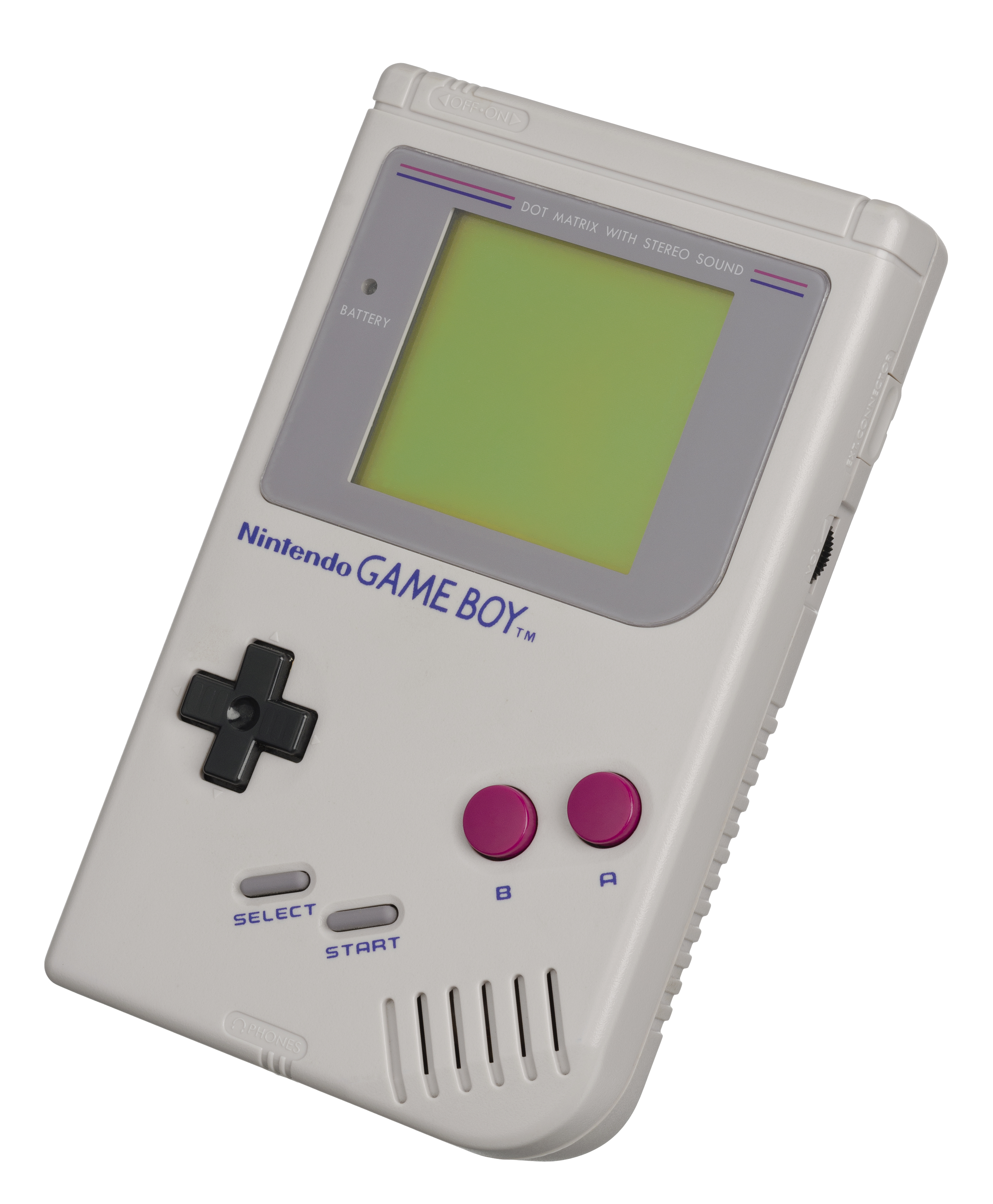
The appearance of Samus's suit was developed in Metroid II due to the Game Boy's greyscale display.

Metroid II was developed by Nintendo Research & Development 1 (Nintendo R&D1), and produced by Gunpei Yokoi; they both also worked on the previous Metroid game for the Nintendo Entertainment System. It was directed by Hiroji Kiyotake and Hiroyuki Kimura, and designed by Makoto Kano, while Takahiro Harada serving as the main programmer. Metroid II marked a "new high point" for handheld game consoles, with graphics that were almost as good as the 8-bit graphics in games for the NES. The game features enhancements from its predecessor that include easier controls which allow Samus to crouch while firing at the same time, and jump while shooting straight down to attack anything below her. The game utilizes the cartridge's battery-backed memory for saving the player's progress. In the 2004 interview for the Nintendo Dream magazine, Kiyotake revealed that the planet SR388 was named after the Yamaha SR400 motorcycle.

The Game Boy's black-and-white graphics resulted in changes to Samus's gear that eventually became permanent. In the original Metroid, color was used to differentiate between Samus's Power Suit and her Varia Suit (an upgraded version), but without color on the Game Boy, the two suits would have appeared similar, requiring the developers to develop a visual indicator for players to determine which suit Samus is wearing. They also updated her Varia Suit, adding round metal shoulders that have been a part of the suit in every Metroid game since.

== Release ==
Metroid II was released in North America in November 1991. This was followed by the release in Japan on January 21, 1992, and in Europe on May 21. It has shipped 1.72 million copies worldwide by late 2003. Nintendo included the game in its Player's Choice marketing label in North America in 1993. It was re-released through the Nintendo Power service in Japan on March 1, 2000. Metroid II, along with other Game Boy games such as Super Mario Land 2: 6 Golden Coins, Mega Man: Dr. Wily's Revenge, and several others were released on the Nintendo 3DS Virtual Console service in 2011. It was released in Japan on September 28, and in North America and Europe on November 24.

=== Remakes ===
An unofficial remake of Metroid II, AM2R, was released in August 2016 for Windows. It received positive reviews, with critics calling it impressive and commenting on the improved visuals compared to those of Metroid II. Shortly after the release, following legal action from Nintendo, development of AM2R was halted and download links were removed. An official remake of Metroid II, Metroid: Samus Returns, was developed by MercurySteam and Nintendo EPD and released for the Nintendo 3DS on September 15, 2017.

== Reception ==
=== Contemporary ===
Reception

Review scores
Publication	Score
Aktueller Software Markt	7/12
The Daily Progress	A
Daily Record	6/10
Entertainment Weekly	A+
Famitsu	6/10, 7/10, 7/10, 5/10
Génération 4	75%
Joystick	76%
Player One	91%
Total!	66%
Video Games	72%

From contemporary reviews, reviewers in Aktueller Software Markt, GB Action, The Daily Progress complimented the sprites and animation in the game. Reviews in Dorset Echo, Famitsu and Daily Record were generally found the graphics as a whole mediocre, with a Famitsu reviewer finding them plain, and a critic writing for Video Games finding them too dark. The reviewer in Video Games said the atmosphere of the game did not come across well through the Game Boy hardware. A Famitsu reviewer said it still had the "dark atmosphere" from the original Metroid. Entertainment Weekly described it as giving "the feeling of being trapped in someone else's nightmare — a quality shared by the best science fiction, be it in the form of books, movies, or video games."

Some reviewers compared the game to the original NES game. Two reviewers in Famitsu found it to be a step down from the first game, while Martin Gaksch of Video Games writing that "expectations were only partially met" as a sequel to Metroid. The Daily Progress commented on the games length and scope, with the former publications writing that as it had a longer playtime than the original, which was "quite an accomplishment." and Entertainment Weekly improves upon the first Metroid by enlarging the terrain and giving its eponymous monsters the ability to mutate, complicating the search-and-destroy mission. A review in Player One found it to be a "rich and challenging game" and that "the length of the game matches the game's longevity".

Discussing the gameplay, a reviewer in Famitsu found there to be plenty of surprises to make it a satisfying Metroid game for the Game Boy. Gaksch found navigating the game too confusing and wished the game had a map feature while Total! said that the game was full of large and empty featureless areas. Gaksch concluded that "instead of "real" action-adventure elements, shooting and running dominate" and that the game was "a good action game" but it "doesn't turn out to be the top-notch game we expected." Génération 4 described it as a "well made and original", GB Action summarized that it was "not among the best games" for the Game Boy, and Aktueller Software Markt concluded that it was a "pretty decent game for young gamers."

In March 1992, Game Players magazine had their Annual Awards for the best video games of 1991. Metroid II was included in their "Excellence Awards" category for Game Boy games, along with Battletoads, Beetlejuice, Hatris, Mega Man: Dr. Wily's Revenge, Prince of Persia and Super R.C. Pro-Am.

=== Retrospective ===
Reception

Review scores
Publication	Score
1up.com	D+
Allgame	4.5/5
Game Informer	8.5/10
IGN	9/10
Nintendo Life	7/10
USGamer	3/5

Retrospectively, Brett Weiss of Allgame felt that Metroid II's controls were tight. He complimented the larger areas to explore, and Game Informer echoed this sentiment, stating it was even larger than Metroid. Both felt that despite Metroid II being larger, there were less secrets to discover than the earlier game. Jeremy Parish, writing for 1up.com in 2004 and again for USgamer in 2017, said that the zoomed-in perspective led to a terrible impediment for a game focused on jumping and ranged combat, although he felt the alien monsters kept the game interesting. Parish wrote that exploration felt "long and repetitive" due to a lack of unique areas, stating that "the brilliant level designs for which the series has become known hadn't yet gelled". He also felt that the small size of the Game Boy's screen did not really suit the exploration Metroid was known for. He felt the music was "downright painful", particularly for a series "known for its moody, atmospheric compositions."

IGN felt the exploration grew tedious and that first-time players were certain to get lost. Conversely, Nintendo Life found the game fairly linear and felt that the lack of an in-game map would not cause problems to players. Nintendo Life found that the music was as a whole was "not really good" and "random bleeps and bloops which are supposed to be environmental tones". IGN found the music "strange", but its lack of aesthetic detail boosted the games atmosphere.

Game Informer described the graphics as "near perfect" while Weiss complimented detailed backgrounds and the quality of Samus Aran's sprite. IGN felt the visuals overall were appropriate for the game while being "a tad plain", specifically noting that the walls were too similar, which led to confusion in navigation. IGN felt the sprites overall looked far better on the Game Boy Color, and recommended that it be played there instead. Parish said the graphics were not bad for the Game Boy, but only Samus's sprite looked great.

Parish summarized retrospective reception to the game, saying "it's still a Metroid game. Which means that as the American gaming press, we can't help but love it a little." Parish concluded that the game "painfully antiquated in 2004" and "best left to completists". In 2017, he wrote that Metroid II made up for its shortcomings by introducing many new ideas to the series, specifically with a wider array of weapons and powers, save points for the player, and a multi-stage lifecycle for the metroids. Parish found the original NES game superior, while feeling Metroid II was "artificial and contrived" compared to later games in the genre, such as Castlevania: Symphony of the Night (1997). He suggested that the game was "nearly forgotten" in Japan. IGN described it as "very good", heightened by its superb suspense and increased variety compared to the average platforming game.

In September 1997, 12 Nintendo Power staff members voted in a list for the top 100 games of all time. The magazine placed Metroid II at 34th place on their list of top 100 games of all time. In their Top 200 Games list, Nintendo Power also ranked the game as the 85th best game on a Nintendo console, and Videogames.com included it in their list of the best Game Boy games. Nintendo Power listed it as the 12th-best Game Boy/Game Boy Color video game, praising it for introducing several staple abilities to the series. In 1998, Game Informer included the game in their list of the "Top 25 Game Boy Games of All-Time". Ben Reeves of Game Informer included it the list of the ninth best Game Boy game and noted that it polarized fans.

== Sequel ==
Super Metroid, the third installment of the Metroid series, was released for the Super Nintendo Entertainment System in 1994. The game's story takes place after the events of Metroid II, and follows Samus as she travels to planet Zebes in an attempt to retrieve an infant Metroid stolen by Ridley. Metroid director Yoshio Sakamoto said at the 2010 Game Developers Conference that he was "very moved" by the ending of Metroid II, which motivated him to create Super Metroid.
