= Metroid Prime Hunters =

2006 video game

- North American box art
- Developer: Nintendo Software Technology
- Publisher: Nintendo
- Director: Masamichi Abe
- Producers: Kensuke Tanabe; Shigeki Yamashiro; Robert Champagne
- Designers: Richard Vorodi; Wing S. Cho; Jonathan Johnson; Michael Harrington; Chris Donovan
- Programmers: Colin Reed; Jonathan Johnson
- Artist: Michael Harrington
- Writers: Richard Vorodi; John Layman
- Composers: Lawrence Schwedler; James Phillipsen
- Series: Metroid
- Platform: Nintendo DS
- Release: NA: March 20, 2006; EU: May 5, 2006; AU: May 23, 2006; JP: June 1, 2006; KOR: December 6, 2007
- Genres: Action-adventure, first-person shooter
- Modes: Single-player, multiplayer

Metroid Prime Hunters is a 2006 action-adventure game developed by Nintendo Software Technology and published by Nintendo for the Nintendo DS. It was released in North America in March 2006, with other territories later. The story takes place in between the events of Metroid Prime and Metroid Prime 2: Echoes. Players assume the role of series protagonist Samus Aran, who investigates a mysterious message that originated from the Alimbic Cluster and comes into contact with a legion of bounty hunters.

The game contains more first-person shooter aspects than previous titles in the Metroid Prime series, emphasizing various multiplayer modes with Wi-Fi and voice chat capabilities. It introduced new bounty hunters with unique weapons and alternative forms as well as the ability to travel to different planets with Samus' gunship, concepts later expanded upon in Metroid Prime 3: Corruption. Hunters was announced by Nintendo at the 2004 Electronic Entertainment Expo. A pack-in demo version of the game, titled Metroid Prime Hunters: First Hunt, was included with the Nintendo DS when it launched in November.

Reviews were generally favorable towards the game; praise focused on its gameplay and graphics, while criticism targeted its control scheme. It also received several honors; including an "Editors' Choice" award from IGN, which also named the game the "Best DS Action Game" of 2006, while Nintendo Power gave it awards for "Best Graphics", "Best Shooter/Action Game", and "Best Wi-Fi Functionality". Over 410,000 copies of the game were sold in North America in its first month of release, and it was the fourth best-selling game during its debut month in Japan. Metroid Prime Hunters was re-released on the Wii U's Virtual Console service in Japan in 2015, and in North America and Europe the following year.

== Gameplay ==
In multiplayer, every character has their own unique interface design. The HUD and touchscreen for the bounty hunter Trace is shown here.

Like the previous titles in the Prime series, Metroid Prime Hunters is generally classified as an action-adventure with navigation and discovery being prominent gameplay elements. The game differs from its predecessors with the removal of assisted aiming, more action-oriented gameplay, and the inclusion of an online multiplayer mode. The player controls Samus Aran, who is equipped with a Power Suit that allows her to access her gunship from anywhere. She can scan almost any object in the game; the gunship will return relevant information retrieved from its database. An Arm Cannon is attached to the Power Suit, which she uses to attack enemies. To enter small tunnels, Samus can roll into a Morph Ball, an alternative form of the Power Suit that decreases her size substantially. In this form, she is given an unlimited supply of bombs but is only allowed to use three at a time. She can use the bombs to defend herself and destroy small objects.

In Metroid Prime Hunters, the Nintendo DS's top screen shows Samus's HUD as seen from her visor, which displays the amount of remaining ammunition for the currently selected weapon along with her health; in multiplayer games, the number of kills and time remaining in the round are also shown. The bottom touchscreen displays the radar. When using the default control scheme, movement is controlled using the D-pad, and aiming is controlled by dragging the stylus along the touchscreen.

Metroid Prime Hunters features a multiplayer mode that supports up to four players and includes voice chat capability. In it, the player is able to control Samus or one of six other bounty hunters featured in the single-player mode. Each bounty hunter has a unique alternative form, such as Samus's Morph Ball, and a special weapon. The game host can set options for point and time limits, and restrict the use of radar. Computer-controlled players of varying skill levels can be added to games if the minimum of four players is not met.

== Synopsis ==
=== Setting and characters ===
Metroid Prime Hunters takes place between Metroid Prime and Metroid Prime 2: Echoes, and is set within the Alimbic Cluster in the Tetra Galaxy, where it was once ruled by the Alimbic race, who disappeared without notice, leaving artifacts scattered throughout the planetary system. In the present, a telepathic message is sent from the Cluster to bounty hunters and other intelligent species, stating the key to the "ultimate power" resides there. The planetary system consists of two planets (Alinos and Arcterra) and two space stations (the Celestial Archives and the Vesper Defense Outpost).

The protagonist of the single-player "adventure mode" is bounty hunter Samus Aran, who investigates the Alimbic Cluster after the Galactic Federation receives a telepathic message. During the investigation, Samus is confronted by six other bounty hunters: Sylux, a deadly sharpshooter who harbors a strong hatred for the Federation and Samus by association; Weavel, a cybernetic Space Pirate warrior who was injured in a battle with Samus; Trace, a feared member of the Kriken Empire; Kanden, a lab experiment and a supersoldier that was invincible; Noxus, a bounty hunter of the proud and reclusive Vhozon race; and Spire, the last of the silicon-based Diamonts.

=== Plot ===
The governing body of the galaxy, the Galactic Federation, receives a strange telepathic message. The Federation broadcasts a message to bounty hunter Samus Aran, asking her to investigate and retrieve the "ultimate power", and should it prove irretrievable, to keep it secret or destroy it outright. Six other bounty hunters intercept the transmission and proceed to the Alimbic solar system to claim the power for themselves.

Through investigation of the planets and space stations that orbit the Alimbic sun, Samus gradually pieces together the history of the Alimbic race. She discovers that they were a peaceful, spiritual, highly evolved society. The Alimbic utopia was shattered when a comet struck the planet (Alinos), and out of it emerged a monstrous creature named Gorea. The creature copied the cellular structure of the Alimbics, physically mimicking them and their weapons, and destroyed their civilization. Unable to stop Gorea's rampage, the last of their race transformed themselves into focused telepathic energy, then confined Gorea into a "Seal Sphere", which they placed in a starship called the Oubliette. The ship was launched into a dimensional rift called the Infinity Void, to be released only when eight keys called "Octoliths" were assembled.

After warding off the other bounty hunters, Samus retrieves the eight Octoliths and opens the Infinity Void. Here, she and the other six hunters confront Gorea, who originated the telepathic message in an attempt to free itself. After the beast absorbs the powers of Samus' rivals, Samus engaged in a proacted battle with it. If she did not heed the words of the Alimbic prophecy by shooting seven colored panels in the arena with their representative sub-weapon in a particular sequence, Gorea's demise would quickly destroy the Oubliette before any of the hunters could evacuate to safety. Otherwise, the panels would transport her and Gorea to another realm for a more definitive final battle where Gorea becomes invincible to all weapons, save for the new Alimbic weapon, the "Omega Cannon", which Samus finds and uses to destroy Gorea once and for all. As Samus and the other hunters evacuate the exploding Oubliette on their respective ships, three Alimbic spirits appear before an armorless Samus, and honor her with a salute.

== Development ==
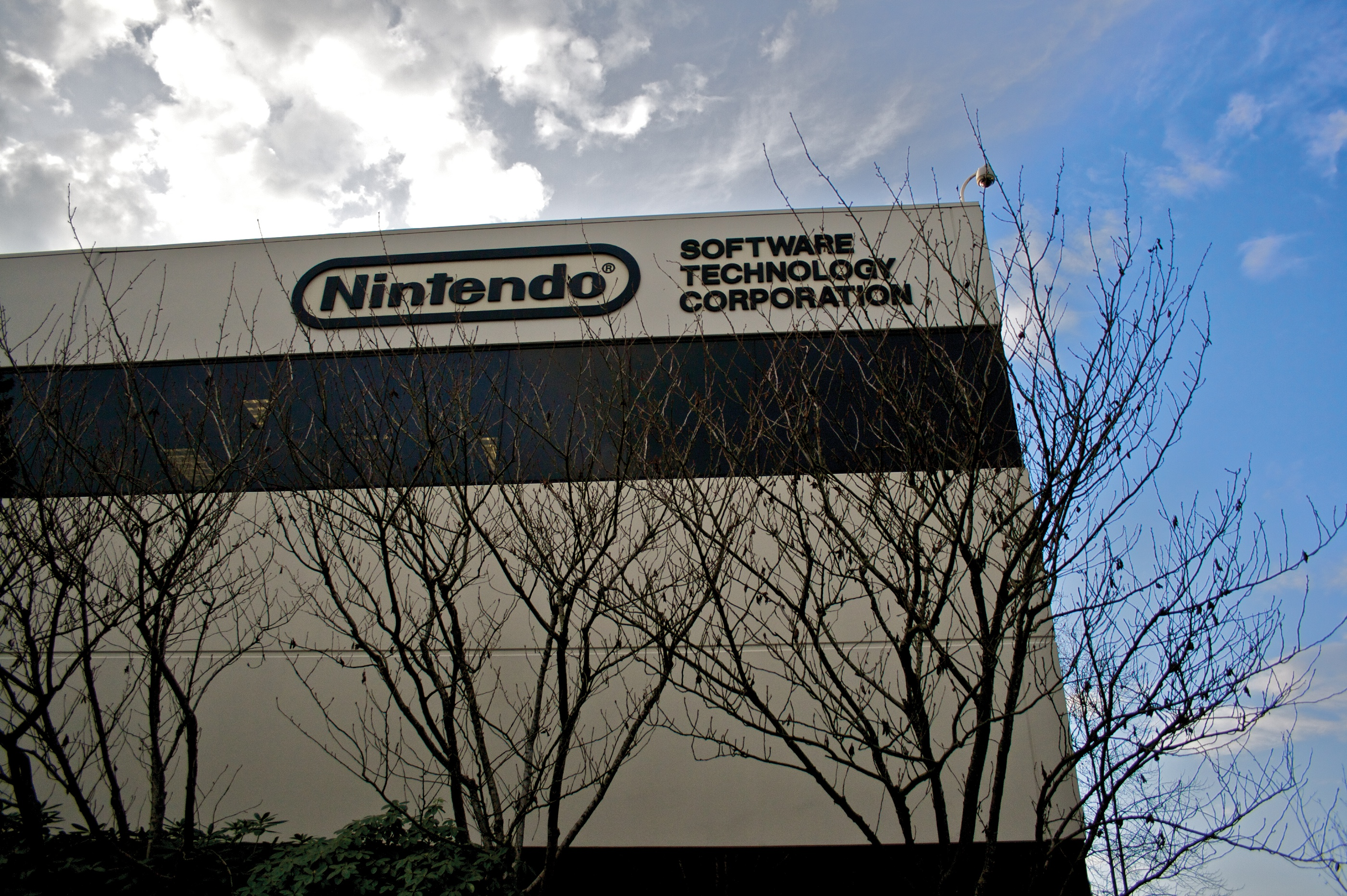
Metroid Prime Hunters was developed by Nintendo Software Technology, which is based in Redmond, Washington.

The development team for Metroid Prime Hunters at Nintendo Software Technology (NST) was led by the game's director, Masamichi Abe and the lead technical engineer, Colin Reed, who had both previously worked together on several games, including the Nintendo games Pikmin and 1080° Snowboarding. The team for Hunters was composed of thirty people, which Abe noted was larger than the development team of most other Nintendo DS games. Kensuke Tanabe of Nintendo came up with the original idea for the game. Retro Studios, which developed previous Metroid Prime games, was unable to develop Metroid Prime Hunters because it was already working on a game. Therefore, Tanabe contacted NST with the idea, and let them develop it instead. NST developed the game instead of Nintendo themselves because Nintendo wanted the division to influence Metroid Prime Hunters with western ideals, styles, and presentation.

While developing the game, most of NST's efforts were focused on its multiplayer aspect because of its first-person shooter gameplay, and to take advantage of the Wi-Fi and voice chat capabilities of the Nintendo DS. One of the game's designers, Richard Vorodi, noted that "the hardware kinda dictated their focus onto the game's multiplayer mode". Wanting to introduce a new element to the Metroid series, Abe created several new bounty hunters after he realized that the game's multiplayer mode and the new bounty hunters could both be implemented seamlessly into the game: "We had this idea early on and thought that would be a good way to introduce Metroid Prime Hunters and the new bounty hunters to the gameplay and take advantage of that in the multiplayer". Metroid Prime Hunters includes several references to previous games in the Metroid Prime series. Samus' ship is from the original Metroid Prime, and her suit is the same one that appears in Echoes. The developers decided to add them because they wanted to show that the technology has evolved, and they also wanted to include something that was instantly recognizable to those who had played previous games in the series. On level design, Abe said that as the game's controls shifted from an analog stick method to touchscreen aiming, the developers wanted to avoid making the gameplay and the control scheme more difficult.

Metroid Prime Hunters was first revealed at the Electronic Entertainment Expo (E3) 2004, with IGN giving the game their Best Nintendo DS Game of E3 award. When Nintendo received negative feedback at E3 2005 about the game's lack of an online feature, the company announced in August that the game's release was delayed to give the developers time to implement Nintendo WFC support. After the game's release was delayed to give NST time to implement the multiplayer feature, the developers took the time to make more changes. They worked on the game's framerate to make the graphics move more smoothly. The game's visuals were improved; a developer added reflections to the Morph Ball. The other developers admired the effect, and added it to other parts of the game. NST collaborated with Retro Studios, the company behind several Metroid games, to design the game's art and characters to make sure that they fit into the overall Metroid series. When asked why Metroid Prime Hunters was placed between Metroid Prime and Metroid Prime 2: Echoes chronologically, Reed noted that the game was not influenced by the story of either game, so there were no continuity issues. He described Hunters as a side story to the Metroid Prime series.

== Marketing and release ==
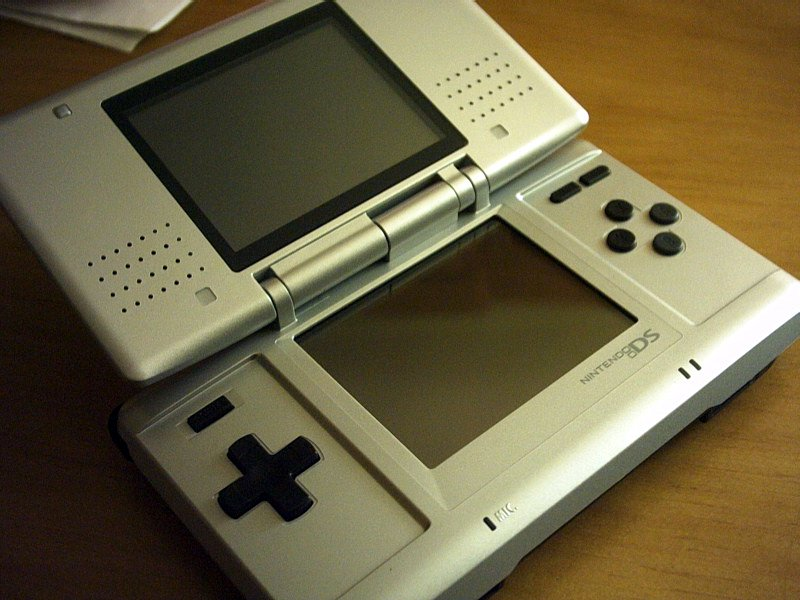
The demo version of the game, Metroid Prime Hunters: First Hunt, was bundled with the Nintendo DS at launch.

A preview of Metroid Prime Hunters was featured at E3 2004, which players control different colored variations of Samus in a deathmatch. A demo version, titled Metroid Prime Hunters: First Hunt, was included as a pack-in game with the Nintendo DS when it launched in North America on November 21. As a single-player game, it consists of training scenarios with no specific plot, while the multiplayer portion allows up to four players to compete via the Nintendo DS' local wireless communications. GamesRadar wrote a positive review for the demo, citing it as "a fine showcase for demonstrating what the Nintendo DS hardware is capable of". In early 2006, a preview video for Hunters was made available for download through the DS Download Station. A playable demo was also available from the Download Station in North America.

In 2006, Nintendo promoted the release of Metroid Prime Hunters in the United States with a television commercial, featuring a gravedigger burying dead bounty hunters in a futuristic setting. The commercial was directed by Len Wiseman, known for his work on the Underworld series, and was produced by the Leo Burnett Worldwide, while the special effects were handled by Ntropic. According to Wiseman, the commercial intends to "give the players a sense of how high the body count is going to be in this game, the amount of mayhem, and just how vicious Samus can be". In May, Nintendo of Europe and HMV held the "Hunt Is On Tournament" competition in several locations throughout the United Kingdom, with BT Openzone providing a video link.

Metroid Prime Hunters was released on March 20, 2006 in North America, followed by the release in Europe on May 5, in Australia on May 23, in Japan on June 1, and in South Korea on December 6, 2007. The game was later re-released on the Wii U's Virtual Console service, in Japan on September 30, 2015, in North America on June 2, 2016, and in Europe on September 15.

== Reception ==
Reception

Aggregate score
Aggregator	Score
Metacritic	85/100

Review scores
Publication	Score
1Up.com	B+
Electronic Gaming Monthly	B
Eurogamer	8/10
Game Informer	8.5/10
GamePro	4.5/5
GameRevolution	B+
GameSpot	8.6/10
GameSpy	4.5/5
GamesRadar+	9/10
GameZone	9/10
IGN	9/10
Nintendo Power	85%
The Guardian	4/5
X-Play	3/5
The Australian	9/10
The Independent	4/5
The Press	90%
The Sunday Times	5/5
The Times	5/5
The Toronto Sun	4.5/5
The Washington Times	3/5

Metroid Prime Hunters was given "generally favorable" reviews, according to Metacritic. Several reviews praised the amount of value that Metroid Prime Hunters offered on the Nintendo DS handheld video game console. GameZone considered the game phenomenal, and believed that it used the DS to its maximum potential regarding graphical ability and innovation. The Toronto Sun remarked that the graphics were big enough selling points on their own for the game, and The Press called Metroid Prime Hunters the best-looking game for the Nintendo DS. The Australian agreed that the graphics are "outstanding" and push the Nintendo DS to its limits, and The Independent asserted that Metroid Prime Hunters was perhaps the best first-person shooter ever for a handheld console. GamePro was surprised how Nintendo squeezed Hunters into a small DS cartridge. Despite a few "small quirks", the magazine noted that Hunters "is a very polished game". The Times concurred with these claims, noting that the touchscreen capability worked very well on the system.

GameRevolution admired the "high-quality work" found in the game's production design and smooth online play. 1UP.com asserted that fans of the Metroid series should recognize the technical achievements that the game showcases. GamesRadar lauded Metroid Prime Hunters' gameplay, and believed that the game was strictly for hardcore gamers "who live for fragfests". Convinced that making a Metroid game different from its slow-paced adventure predecessors into a "nail-biting wrecking ball" was a "risky trick", they appreciated the results. Both GameSpot and Game Informer enjoyed the game's "worthwhile" and "electrifying" multiplayer mode. Nintendo Power praised the game as a "new-school, action-packed" game that makes a "great addition to the growing collection of Wi-Fi titles", and The Guardian claimed the game's multiplayer aspect as their favorite feature. The Sunday Times wrote that Metroid Prime Hunters does a "staggering job" of replicating the style of previous Metroid Prime games.

Complaints about the game stemmed primarily from its control scheme. IGN found that the high learning curve and "cramp-inducing" control scheme made it difficult to play. This sentiment was shared by Electronic Gaming Monthly, which claimed that placing the interface used to switch visors and weapons on the touchscreen made the process unnecessarily complex. The magazine was also disappointed with the game's single-player mode, claiming that it does not live up to the experience offered in previous games in the Metroid Prime series. They criticized the levels as "contrived and predictable", and noted that the designs felt too formulaic "after a few worlds of hunting for keys, fighting repeat bosses, and escaping before the bomb blows". The Washington Times agreed that the game's repetitiveness eventually grew tiring, and that "manipulating the DS controls will be a painfully cramped endeavor".

Concurring with this sentiment, GameSpy noted that using the stylus to play the game felt a bit strange. Eurogamer also expressed their disapproval of the control scheme, predicting it would lead to "the coming years of physiotherapy on [their] arms". They were also unhappy with the game's "flimsy" multiplayer experience, noting that it is best used when played locally with friends who also have the game. X-Play had particularly negative sentiments about the game, feeling that it was poorly implemented into the hardware.

Metroid Prime Hunters was the fourth best-selling game in its debut month in Japan, selling 32,467 units, and has since sold over 90,000 units there. Over 410,000 units of the game were sold in North America in 2006. Hunters received several awards and honors. IGN gave it an "Editors' Choice" award, and named it the "Best DS Action Game" of 2006. The game also received the awards for "Best Graphics", "Best Shooter/Action Game", and "Best Wi-Fi Functionality" from Nintendo Power for 2006.

== Appearances in other games ==
The bounty hunters in Metroid Prime Hunters are featured in Super Smash Bros. Brawl as unlockable character trophies. Sylux also makes a minor appearance in Metroid Prime 3: Corruption, where he follows Samus in the game's ending. Tanabe said in E3 2015 that he wanted to create a story that centers around Samus and Sylux, noting that "there's something going on between them. I want to make a game that touches upon it". With a Nintendo 3DS game, Metroid Prime: Federation Force, Tanabe hoped that Federation Force's plot would lead to future Metroid Prime games based on the relationship between Samus and Sylux, with additional involvement from the Galactic Federation marines. In Federation Force, Sylux appears in the game's special ending, stealing a Metroid. Metroid Prime 4: Beyond features Sylux as the main antagonist, following up on the teases in Corruption and Federation Force.

== Sources ==
- Nintendo Software Technology (March 20, 2006). Metroid Prime Hunters (Nintendo DS). Nintendo.
- Metroid Prime Hunters Official Nintendo Player's Guide. Nintendo of America. March 2006. ISBN 978-1-598-12001-1.
