= List of major Super Smash Bros. Melee tournaments =

This list details major Super Smash Bros. Melee tournaments from 2007 to the present.

== Major tournaments ==
Tournament	Location	Date	Format	Entrants	Prize pool	1st	2nd	3rd	4th	Refs.
Cataclysm 3	Spencer, Massachusetts	March 3–4, 2007	Singles	112	US$1,680	Mew2King	KoreanDJ	ChuDat	PC Chris	
Cataclysm 3	Spencer, Massachusetts	March 3–4, 2007	Doubles	58	US$1,160	Mew2King, Isai	KoreanDJ, JBlaze	ChuDat, Forward	Wife, Husband	
Pound 2	Mount Airy, Maryland	June 16–17, 2007	Singles	201	US$5,000	ChuDat	Mew2King	Jiano	Chillin	
Pound 2	Mount Airy, Maryland	June 16–17, 2007	Doubles	83		Mew2King, PC Chris	Viperboy, KeepSpeedN	Aho, Fonz	Taj, Forward	
The Renaissance of Smash 4	Varberg, Sweden	July 3–6, 2007	Singles	132		Amsah	Aldwyn	Helios	Armada	
The Renaissance of Smash 4	Varberg, Sweden	July 3–6, 2007	Doubles	64		Helios, Ek	Amsah, Faab	Masamune, Kriz	Armada, Aniolas	
MELEE-FC Diamond	South Bend, Indiana	July 12–14, 2007	Singles	256	US$4,550	Mew2King	PC Chris	ChuDat	Drephen	
MELEE-FC Diamond	South Bend, Indiana	July 12–14, 2007	Doubles	123	US$4,050	PC Chris, Cort	ChuDat, Chillin	Xelic, Caveman	Dope, Vidjogamer	
Zero Challenge 3	Santa Fe Springs, California	July 20–22, 2007	Singles	228	US$2,150	PC Chris	Mew2King	ChuDat	Ken	
Zero Challenge 3	Santa Fe Springs, California	July 20–22, 2007	Doubles	79	US$2,100	Isai, The King	Ken, Bombsoldier	SilentSpectre, Tang	Mew2King, ChuDat	
EVO West	San Diego, California	July 27–29, 2007	Singles	128	US$1,280	Mew2King	PC Chris	ChuDat	Edrees	
EVO World 2007	Henderson, Nevada	August 24–26, 2007	Singles	270	US$10,250	Ken	HugS	Mango	PC Chris	
Super Champ Combo	San Bernardino, California	September 29–30, 2007	Singles	201	US$4,000	Mew2King	PC Chris	Mango	Cort	
Super Champ Combo	San Bernardino, California	September 29–30, 2007	Doubles	75	US$1,850	Chillen, Azen	PC Chris, Cort	Mango, Lucky	Mew2King, HugS	
Viva La Smashtaclysm	Torrington, Connecticut	November 10–11, 2007	Singles	188	US$2,820	Azen	ChuDat	KoreanDJ	Mew2King	
Viva La Smashtaclysm	Torrington, Connecticut	November 10–11, 2007	Doubles	75	US$1,500	Chillen, Azen	Mew2King, Vidjogamer	KoreanDJ, ChuDat	PC Chris, Cort	
Pound 3	Baltimore, Maryland	February 2–3, 2008	Singles	224	Unknown	Mango	Mew2King	PC Chris	Cort	
Pound 3	Baltimore, Maryland	February 2–3, 2008	Doubles	109	Unknown	Mew2King, Azen	Mango, Forward	PC Chris, Cort	ChuDat, Chillin	
Epita Smash Arena 2	Villejuif, France	February 23–24, 2008	Singles	231	US$6,926	Amsah	Captain Jack	Armada	Masashi	
Epita Smash Arena 2	Villejuif, France	February 23–24, 2008	Doubles	97	US$2,991	Strawhat Dahean, Overtriforce	Captain jack, Masashi	Calle W, Svampen	Iñf, Poilon	
Revival of Melee	Nanuet, New York	March 7–8, 2009	Singles	136	US$1,350	Mango	Mew2King	DaShizWiz	PC Chris	
Revival of Melee	Nanuet, New York	March 7–8, 2009	Doubles	49	US$960	Mango, PC Chris	Mew2King, Jman	Kage, Vwins	Hungrybox, Colbol	
SMASH ATTACK	Bremen, Germany	April 3–5, 2009	Singles	131		Armada	Zgetto	Amsah	Adam	
SMASH ATTACK	Bremen, Germany	April 3–5, 2009	Doubles			Zgetto, Faab	Amsah, Adam	Armada, Aniolas	Fuzzyness, Yuna	
GENESIS	Antioch, California	July 10–12, 2009	Singles	290	US$5,700	Mango	Armada	Hungrybox	Zhu	
GENESIS	Antioch, California	July 10–12, 2009	Doubles	50	US$3,043	Mew2King, Jman	Scar, Darc	Mango, Lucky	Darkrain, Cactuar	
Revival of Melee 2	Nanuet, New York	November 21–22, 2009	Singles	159	US$1,590	Hungrybox	Dr. PeePee	Kage	Mango	
Revival of Melee 2	Nanuet, New York	November 21–22, 2009	Doubles			Mango, Lucky	Bam, Vwins	Scar, Darc	Hungrybox, Cactuar	
Pound 4	Frederick, Maryland	January 16–18, 2010	Singles	347		Mango	Hungrybox	Amsah	Armada	
Pound 4	Frederick, Maryland	January 16–18, 2010	Doubles	138		Mango, Lucky	Darkrain, SilentSpectre	Dr. PeePee, LoZR	Darc, Hax	
Apex 2010	Rutgers University–New Brunswick	August 6–8, 2010	Singles	220	US$3,300	Hungrybox	Armada	Mew2King	Dr. PeePee	
Apex 2010	Rutgers University–New Brunswick	August 6–8, 2010	Doubles	86	US$860	Mango, Lucky	Mew2King, Jman	Armada, Aniolas	Hax, Hungrybox	
B.E.A.S.T	Gothenburg, Sweden	January 7–9, 2011	Singles	100		Armada	Amsah	Ice	Pasi	
B.E.A.S.T	Gothenburg, Sweden	January 7–9, 2011	Doubles			Armada, Aniolas	Amsah, Zgetto	C, Ivp valle	Luma, Ice	
Pound V	Arlington, Virginia	February 19–21, 2011	Singles	243	US$3,645	Dr. PeePee	Armada	Hungrybox	Axe	
Pound V	Arlington, Virginia	February 19–21, 2011	Doubles		US$2,430	Mew2King, Armada	Manga, G$	Hungrybox, Hax	Dr. PeePee, LoZR	
Genesis 2	Antioch, California	July 15–17, 2011	Singles	228	US$7,425	Armada	Mango	Taj	Hungrybox	
Genesis 2	Antioch, California	July 15–17, 2011	Doubles	74	US$3,900	Mango, Lucky	Mew2King, Dr. PeePee	Hungrybox, Hax	Armada, Aniolas	
Apex 2012	Somerset, New Jersey	January 6–8, 2012	Singles	318	US$6,756	Armada	Hungrybox	Mango	Javi	
Apex 2012	Somerset, New Jersey	January 6–8, 2012	Doubles	98	US$1,960	Armada, Mew2King	Hungrybox, Plup	Dr. PeePee, LoZR	G$, Mango	
Apex 2013	Rutgers University-New Brunswick	January 11–13, 2013	Singles	336	US$6,540	Armada	Dr. PeePee	Mew2King	Mango	
Apex 2013	Rutgers University-New Brunswick	January 11–13, 2013	Doubles	106	US$2,189	Armada, Mew2King	Hungrybox, Plup	Shroomed, PewPewU	DoH, Mango	
Zenith 2013	Morristown, New Jersey	June 1–2, 2013	Singles	126	US$1,260	Mango	Hungrybox	CT | Mew2King	VGBC | Dr. PeePee	
Zenith 2013	Morristown, New Jersey	June 1–2, 2013	Doubles	33	US$660	Mew2King, Hax	Hungrybox, DoH	Dr. PeePee, Unknown522	Mango, Scar	
EVO 2013	Paris Las Vegas	July 12–14, 2013	Singles	709	$7,960	MIOM | Mango	Wobbles	CT | Hungrybox	Armada	
EVO 2013	Paris Las Vegas	July 12–14, 2013	Doubles			Mew2King, Hungrybox	Mango, Lucky	PewPewU, SFAT	Armada, Android	
The Big House 3	Ann Arbor, Michigan	October 12–13, 2013	Singles	172	US$2,400	EMP CT | Mew2King	CT | Hungrybox	VGBC | Dr. PeePee	SFAT	
The Big House 3	Ann Arbor, Michigan	October 12–13, 2013	Doubles	48	US$960	Mew2King, Hungrybox	SFAT, PewPewU	Dr. PeePee, Hax	Kage, VaNz	
Apex 2014	Somerset, New Jersey	January 17–19, 2014	Singles	629	US$10,480	VGBC | Dr. PeePee	CT EMP | Mew2King	MIOM | Mango	Leffen	
Apex 2014	Somerset, New Jersey	January 17–19, 2014	Doubles	160	US$3,200	Mew2King, Hax	Mango, Lucky	Hungrybox, Plup	Armada, Ice	
Get On My Level 2014	York University	May 10–11, 2014	Singles	238	US$2,380	C9 | Mango	Crs. Hungrybox	CT EMP | Mew2King	KirbyKaze	
Get On My Level 2014	York University	May 10–11, 2014	Doubles	57	US$1,140	Mew2King, Hungrybox	Mango, Toph	DJ Nintendo, Sauc3	RaynEX, Riddlebox	
Republic of Fighters 3	Noisy-le-Grand	May 17–18, 2014	Singles	192		Leffen	CT EMP | Armada	VGBC | aMSa	Ice	
Republic of Fighters 3	Noisy-le-Grand	May 17–18, 2014	Doubles	64		Armada, Ice	Leffen, Fuzzyness	Faab, Amsah	Professor Pro, VA	
SKTAR 3	Somerset, New Jersey	May 31–June 1, 2014	Singles	237	US$2,370	EG | PPMD	P4K EMP | Mew2King	C9 | Mango	EMP | Armada	
SKTAR 3	Somerset, New Jersey	May 31–June 1, 2014	Doubles	55	US$1,100	Mew2King, Armada	Mango, PPMD	SFAT, Shroomed	Cyrain, Milkman	
Super SWEET	University of Michigan	June 7–8, 2014	Singles	165	US$1,600	P4K EMP | Armada	P4K EMP | Mew2King	C9 | Mango	Axe	
Super SWEET	University of Michigan	June 7–8, 2014	Doubles	45	US$900	Armada, Mew2King	Mango, Scar	KirbyKaze, RaynEX	Duck, Price Abu	
MLG Anaheim 2014	Anaheim Convention Center	June 20–22, 2014	Singles	325	US$15,000	C9 | Mango	P4K EMP | Armada	P4K EMP | Mew2King	EG | PPMD	
MLG Anaheim 2014	Anaheim Convention Center	June 20–22, 2014	Doubles	403		Armada, Mew2King	Mango, Lucky	Shroomed, S2J	ChuDat, Chillin	
CEO 2014	Orlando, Florida	June 27–29, 2014	Singles	262	US$2,740	P4K EMP | Armada	C9 | Mango	Crs. Hungrybox	P4K EMP | Mew2King	
CEO 2014	Orlando, Florida	June 27–29, 2014	Doubles	40	US$800	Armada, Mew2King	Hungrybox, Plup	Chillin, ChuDat	ZeRo, ESAM	
Kings of Cali 4	Westchester, Los Angeles	July 5–6, 2014	Singles	208	US$1,860	C9 | Mango	P4K EMP | Armada	P4K EMP | Mew2King	Lucky	
Kings of Cali 4	Westchester, Los Angeles	July 5–6, 2014	Doubles	44	US$390	Armada, Mew2King	Fiction, MacD	Mango, Scar	Ken, DEHF	
EVO 2014	Las Vegas, Nevada	July 11–13, 2014	Singles	970	US$9,700	C9 | Mango	Crs. Hungrybox	| Armada	EG | PPMD	
EVO 2014	Las Vegas, Nevada	July 11–13, 2014	Doubles	72	US$2,130	Hungrybox, Plup	Mew2King, Hax	Leffen, Ice	PewPewU, SFAT	
Zenith 2014	The NYU Game Center	August 2–3, 2014	Singles	281	US$3,455	P4K EMP | Mew2King	VGBC | Hax	Zhu	MOR | Axe	
Zenith 2014	The NYU Game Center	August 2–3, 2014	Doubles	60		Mew2King, Hax	ZeRo, Axe	Zhu, Cactuar	Zanguzen, Jsex	
The Big House 4	Romulus, Michigan	October 4–5, 2014	Singles	570	US$5,740	C9 | Mango	EMP P4K | Mew2King	Leffen	EMP P4K | Armada	
The Big House 4	Romulus, Michigan	October 4–5, 2014	Doubles	44	US$2,280	Armada, Mew2King	Hungrybox, Plup	Leffen, Hax	MacD, VaNz	
B.E.A.S.T 5	Hvitfeldtska gymnasiet	January 9–11, 2015	Singles	375	€5020	Leffen	[A] Armada	C9 | Mango	Ice	
B.E.A.S.T 5	Hvitfeldtska gymnasiet	January 9–11, 2015	Doubles	111	€2220	Armada, Android	Leffen, Ice	Mango, Baxon	Zgetto, Adam	
Apex 2015	Somerset, New Jersey	January 30–February 1, 2015	Singles	1,037	US$18,070	EG | PPMD	[A] Armada	TSM | Leffen	C9 | Mango	
Apex 2015	Somerset, New Jersey	January 30–February 1, 2015	Doubles	264	US$2,640	Mew2King, Hungrybox	Armada, Android	Ice, Leffen	Chillin, ChuDat	
I'm Not Yelling!	Oakland, California	April 10–11, 2015	Singles	316		[A] Armada	C9 | Mango	TSM | Leffen	CLG | PewPewU	
I'm Not Yelling!	Oakland, California	April 10–11, 2015	Doubles	50	US$2,640	MacD, Leffen	Armada, Shroomed	PewPewU, SFAT	Mango, Lucky	
MVG Sandstorm	Tempe, Arizona	April 18–19, 2015	Singles	231	US$2,309.50	[A] Armada	Westballz	MVG | Axe	Liquid` Hungrybox	
MVG Sandstorm	Tempe, Arizona	April 18–19, 2015	Doubles	49	US$490	MacD, Leffen	Armada, Mew2King	Hungrybox, Silly Kyle	Axe, Forward	
Press Start	Irvine, California	May 9–10, 2015	Singles	222	US$5,500	C9|Mango	Fly Amanita	MVG | Axe	Liquid`Hungrybox	
Press Start	Irvine, California	May 9–10, 2015	Doubles	41	US$4,250	Mew2King, Hungrybox	Leffen, MacD	Mango, Lucky	SFAT, Alan	
Get On My Level 2015	York University	May 30–31, 2015	Singles	224		Liquid`Hungrybox	Hax	KirbyKaze	MacD	
Get On My Level 2015	York University	May 30–31, 2015	Doubles	57		Hax, Hungrybox	Vwins, Kage	RaynEX, Ryan Ford	Duck, Prince Abu	
CEO 2015	Orlando, Florida	June 26–28, 2015	Singles	466	US$7,830	TSM | Leffen	[A] Armada	C9 | Mango	Westballz	
CEO 2015	Orlando, Florida	June 26–28, 2015	Doubles		US$1,740	Armada, Shroomed	Leffen, Hungrybox	PewPewU, SFAT	Westballz, MacD	
WTFox	Memphis, Tennessee	July 10–11, 2015	Singles	150	US$3,050	TSM | Leffen	C9 | Mango	[A] Armada	COG MVG | Mew2King	
WTFox	Memphis, Tennessee	July 10–11, 2015	Doubles	25	US$1,520	Armada, Mew2King	Leffen, Mango	Westballz, Wizzrobe	Darkatma, Shinobi	
EVO 2015	Bally's Las Vegas, Paris Las Vegas	July 17–19, 2015	Singles	1,869	US$18,690	[A] Armada	Liquid`Hungrybox	EG | PPMD	PG | Plup	
EVO 2015	Bally's Las Vegas, Paris Las Vegas	July 17–19, 2015	Doubles	82		PewPewU, SFAT	Armada, Ice	Hungrybox, Plup	Frootloop, Darkatma	
Super Smash Con 2015	Dulles, Virginia	August 6–9, 2015	Singles	398	US$15,860	TSM | Leffen	MVG COG | Mew2King	Tempo | Axe	Tempo | Westballz	
Super Smash Con 2015	Dulles, Virginia	August 6–9, 2015	Doubles	164	US$3,280	Leffen, MacD	Mew2King, Wizzrobe	DJ Nintendo, The Moon	Colbol, Gahtzu	
PAX Prime 2015	Seattle, Washington	August 28–30, 2015	Singles	187	US$3,500	COG MVG | Mew2King	TSM | Leffen	Tempo | Westballz	[62-Bit] Bladewise	
PAX Prime 2015	Seattle, Washington	August 28–30, 2015	Doubles	39	US$1,500	Leffen, MacD	Mew2King, HugS	Westballz, Nintendude	Zhu, Cactuar	
Paragon Los Angeles 2015	Los Angeles, California	September 5–6, 2015	Singles	547	US$5,470	C9 | Mango	COG MVG | Mew2King	Liquid`Hungrybox	Tempo | Westballz	
HTC Throwdown	San Francisco, California	September 19, 2015	Singles	386	US$13,860	TSM | Leffen	Liquid`Hungrybox	GC | Silent Wolf	TGL | DruggedFox	
HTC Throwdown	San Francisco, California	September 19, 2015	Doubles	113	US$3,130	Mew2King, Hungrybox	MacD, Leffen	PewPewU, SFAT	Mango, Lucky	
DreamHack London 2015	London, United Kingdom	September 19–20, 2015	Singles	110	US$20,000	[A] Armada	Tempo | Westballz	mYi | Ice	ATBT | Tekk	
The Big House 5	Dearborn, Michigan	October 2–4, 2015	Singles	1,317	US$18,170	[A] Armada	Liquid`Hungrybox	COG MVG | Mew2King	C9 | Mango	
The Big House 5	Dearborn, Michigan	October 2–4, 2015	Doubles	224	US$6,480	Armada, Android	Mew2King, Hungrybox	Shroomed, Alan	Bladewise, Javi	
MLG World Finals 2015	New Orleans, Louisiana	October 16–18, 2015	Singles	111	US$10,000	Liquid`Hungrybox	COG MVG | Mew2King	Tempo | Axe	COG | Wizzrobe	
MLG World Finals 2015	New Orleans, Louisiana	October 16–18, 2015	Doubles	32	US$5,000	Mew2King, Wizzrobe	Axe, Chillin	DruggedFox, Nintendude	TaylorHJ, Lee	
Smash Summit	Walnut, California	November 4–8, 2015	Singles	16	US$32,929	[A] Armada	C9 | Mango	COG MVG | Mew2King	PG | Plup	
Smash Summit	Walnut, California	November 4–8, 2015	Doubles	8	US$3,000	PewPewU, SFAT	Armada, Mew2King	Mango, Lucky	Shroomed, S2J	
DreamHack Winter 2015	Jönköping, Sweden	November 26–29, 2015	Singles	353	US$20,000	Liquid`Hungrybox	[A] Armada	PG | Plup	Tempo | Westballz	
DreamHack Winter 2015	Jönköping, Sweden	November 26–29, 2015	Doubles	96	US$10,000	Axe, Hungrybox	MacD, Shroomed	Armada, Android	Mango, S2J	
Genesis 3	San Jose, California	January 15–17, 2016	Singles	1,836	US$23,780	[A] Armada	C9 | Mango	Liquid`Hungrybox	Tempo | Axe	
Genesis 3	San Jose, California	January 15–17, 2016	Doubles	460	US$7.940	Mew2King, Armada	PewPewU, SFAT	Swedish Delight, Slox	Hungrybox, Axe	
PAX Arena	San Antonio, Texas	January 29–31, 2016	Singles	~200	US$3,500	Liquid'Hungrybox	C9 | Mango	Tempo | Westballz	Tempo | Axe	
PAX Arena	San Antonio, Texas	January 29–31, 2016	Doubles	~50	US$1,500	Shroomed, SFAT	Mew2King, Hungrybox	Mango, S2J	Axe, Gahtzu	
Battle of the Five Gods	Austin, Texas	March 17–19, 2016	Singles	20	US$25,000	Liquid'Hungrybox	C9 | Mango	[A] Armada	FX.W PG | Wobbles	
Pound 2016	McLean, Virginia	April 2–3, 2016	Singles	933	US$14,075	Liquid'Hungrybox	C9 | Mango	Hax$	BERT | Swedish Delight	
Pound 2016	McLean, Virginia	April 2–3, 2016	Doubles	122	US$2,400	Hungrybox, Plup	PewPewU, SFAT	Westballz, MacD	Swedish Delight, Slox	
Smash Summit 2	Los Angeles, California	April 21–24, 2016	Singles	16	US$30,000+	[A] Armada	Liquid`Hungrybox	COG MVG | Mew2King	C9 | Mango	
Smash Summit 2	Los Angeles, California	April 21–24, 2016	Doubles	8	US$8,000+	Armada, Mew2King	Hungrybox, Plup	Mango, S2J	PewPewU, SFAT	
DreamHack Austin 2016	Austin, Texas	May 6–8, 2016	Singles	397	US$10,000	C9 | Mango	Liquid`Hungrybox	COG MVG | Mew2King	COG | Wizzrobe	
Get On My Level 2016	Toronto, Ontario	May 20–22, 2016	Singles	509	US$7,695.42	TSM RB | Leffen	C9 | Mango	Liquid`Hungrybox	Lucky	
Get On My Level 2016	Toronto, Ontario	May 20–22, 2016	Doubles	100	US$2288.02	PewPewU, SFAT	Mang0, Lucky	Hungrybox, Leffen	Armada, Shroomed	
Smash 'N' Splash 2	Gurnee, Illinois	June 11–12, 2016	Singles	459		Liquid`Hungrybox	BERT | Swedish Delight	FOX MVG | Mew2King	WFX | Shroomed	
Smash 'N' Splash 2	Gurnee, Illinois	June 11–12, 2016	Doubles	96		S2J, Shroomed	Westballz, Wizzrobe	Mew2King, Prince Abu	Duck, SFAT	
DreamHack Summer 2016	Jönköping, Sweden	June 18–21, 2016	Singles	117	US$10,000	TSM RB | Leffen	mYi | Ice	VwS | Professor Pro	Revo | Fuzzyness	
DreamHack Summer 2016	Jönköping, Sweden	June 18–21, 2016	Doubles	54		Android, Amsah	Zoler, Peki	Daydee, Humpe	Zorc, Askeflink	
CEO 2016	Orlando, Florida	June 24–26, 2016	Singles	678	US$6,780	Liquid`Hungrybox	FOX MVG | Mew2King	CLG | SFAT	PG | Plup	
CEO 2016	Orlando, Florida	June 24–26, 2016	Doubles	106	US$2,210	Mew2King, Hungrybox	Plup, Axe	SFAT, PewPewU	Lucky, Reno	
WTFox 2	Memphis, Tennessee	July 1–3, 2016	Singles	292	US$10,000	C9 | Mango	[A] Armada	FOX MVG | Mew2King	COG | Wizzrobe	
WTFox 2	Memphis, Tennessee	July 1–3, 2016	Doubles	67		Armada, Mew2King	SFAT, dizzkidboogie	Colbol, Wizzrobe	Hungrybox, Iori	
EVO 2016	Las Vegas, Nevada	July 15–17, 2016	Singles	2,372	US$23,720	Liquid`Hungrybox	[A] Armada	PG | Plup	C9 | Mango	
Super Smash Con 2016	Chantilly, Virginia	August 11–14, 2016	Singles	940		C9 | Mango	Liquid`Hungrybox	FOX MVG | Mew2King	Tempo | Axe	
Super Smash Con 2016	Chantilly, Virginia	August 11–14, 2016	Doubles	172		Ice, Mew2King	Mango, S2J	PewPewU, SFAT	DruggedFox, MacD	
Heir 3	Nottingham, England	August 19–21, 2016	Singles	472		[A] Armada	Kingsmen | The Moon	VGBC | ChuDat	Overtriforce	
Heir 3	Nottingham, England	August 19–21, 2016	Doubles	167		Armada, Android	Ice, Professor Pro	Overtriforce, Trifasia	ChuDat, reaper	
Shine 2016	Boston, Massachusetts	August 26–28, 2016	Singles	989		FOX MVG | Mew2King	CLG | SFAT	C9 | Mango	Liquid`Hungrybox	
Shine 2016	Boston, Massachusetts	August 26–28, 2016	Doubles	252		Plup, Mew2King	Shroomed, MacD	Silent Wolf, Professor Pro	Westballz, Prince Abu	
The Big House 6	Dearborn, Michigan	October 7–9, 2016	Singles	1,561		C9 | Mango	[A] Armada	Ice	FOX MVG | Mew2King	
The Big House 6	Dearborn, Michigan	October 7–9, 2016	Doubles	323		PewPewU, SFAT	Armada, Android	MacD, Ice	ChuDat, Chillin	
Eclipse 2	Jessheim, Norway	October 21–23, 2016	Singles	247		[A] Armada	LG | Ice	TSM RB | Leffen	Professor Pro	
Eclipse 2	Jessheim, Norway	October 21–23, 2016	Doubles	80		Armada, Android	Leffen, Ice	Trifasia, Overtriforce	Chillin, Professor Pro	
Canada Cup 2016	Toronto, Ontario	October 28–30, 2016	Singles	232		[A] Armada	Liquid`Hungrybox	FOX MVG | Mew2King	KirbyKaze	
Canada Cup 2016	Toronto, Ontario	October 28–30, 2016	Doubles	38		Armada, Mew2King	Trulliam, Ryan Ford	Prince Abu, Kage	MacD, Zhu	
Smash Summit 3	Los Angeles, California	November 3–6, 2016	Singles	16	US$21,090	[A] Armada	Liquid`Hungrybox	FOX MVG | Mew2King	C9 | Mango	
Smash Summit 3	Los Angeles, California	November 3–6, 2016	Doubles	8	US$5,815	Armada, Mew2King	PewPewU, SFAT	Mafia, Leffen	Mango, S2J	
DreamHack Winter 2016	Jönköping, Sweden	November 24–27, 2016	Singles	242	US$30,000	[A] Armada	Liquid`Hungrybox	TSM RB | Leffen	C9 | Mango	
DreamHack Winter 2016	Jönköping, Sweden	November 24–27, 2016	Doubles	49		Overtriforce, Trifasia	mayhem, Salevits	Rocky, Alejandro	Daydee, peki	
UGC Smash Open	Collinsville, Illinois	December 2–4, 2016	Singles	255	US$17,480	[A] Armada	FOX MVG | Mew2King	Liquid`Hungrybox	TSM RB | Leffen	
UGC Smash Open	Collinsville, Illinois	December 2–4, 2016	Doubles	55	US$6,080	SFAT, PewPewU	Leffen, Ice	Armada, Android	Hungrybox, Mew2King	
Don't Park on the Grass	Seattle, Washington	December 17–18, 2016	Singles	640		TSM RB | Leffen	Liquid`Hungrybox	G2 | Westballz	CLG | SFAT	
Don't Park on the Grass	Seattle, Washington	December 17–18, 2016	Doubles	174		SFAT, PewPewU	Leffen, Ice	Swedish Delight, Hungrybox	The Moon, Professor Pro	
Genesis 4	San Jose, California	January 20–22, 2017	Singles	1,704	$18,440	[A] Armada	C9 | Mango	FOX MVG | Mew2King	Liquid`Hungrybox	
Genesis 4	San Jose, California	January 20–22, 2017	Doubles	381	$7,620	Android, Armada	Leffen, Ice	PewPewU, SFAT	Plup, Axe	
BEAST 7	Gothenburg, Sweden	February 17–19, 2017	Singles	409	€4,090	[A] Armada	TSM | Leffen	LG | Ice	MSF | The Moon	
BEAST 7	Gothenburg, Sweden	February 17–19, 2017	Doubles	133	€2,950	Android, Armada	Leffen, Ice	dizzkidboogie, SFAT	Amsah, Jeapie	
Smash Summit – Spring 2017	Los Angeles, California	March 2–5, 2017	Singles	16	US$46,984	[A] Armada	Liquid`Hungrybox	TSM | Leffen	FOX MVG | Mew2King	
Smash Summit – Spring 2017	Los Angeles, California	March 2–5, 2017	Doubles	8	US$12,500	Mew2King, Armada	Leffen, Ice	Mango, Lucky	PewPewU, SFAT	
Full Bloom 3	Bloomington, Indiana	March 25, 2017	Singles	316		Liquid`Hungrybox	Duck	CLG | SFAT	Tempo | Axe	
Full Bloom 3	Bloomington, Indiana	March 25, 2017	Doubles	63		Hungrybox, SFAT	The Moon, Swedish Delight	S2J, Shroomed	DruggedFox, MacD	
Smash Rivalries	Burbank, California	April 8–9, 2017	Singles	16	US$4,050	Liquid`Hungrybox	Wizzrobe	DruggedFox	CLG | SFAT	
Smash Rivalries	Burbank, California	April 8–9, 2017	Doubles	8	US$4,750	Mango, Lucky	Hungrybox, Mew2King	PewPewU, SFAT	Shroomed, S2J	
CEO Dreamland	Orlando, Florida	April 14–16, 2017	Singles	333		FOX MVG | Mew2King	CLG | SFAT	Liquid`Hungrybox	RNG | Swedish Delight	
CEO Dreamland	Orlando, Florida	April 14–16, 2017	Doubles	78		PewPewU, SFAT	Hungrybox, Mew2King	MacD, DruggedFox	Swedish Delight, Slox	
DreamHack Austin 2017	Austin, Texas	April 28–30, 2017	Singles	430	US$10,000	Liquid`Hungrybox	VGBC | ChuDat	FOX MVG | Mew2King	C9 | Mango	
DreamHack Austin 2017	Austin, Texas	April 28–30, 2017	Doubles	66		Mango, SFAT	Plup, Mew2King	Armada, Android	S2J, Shroomed	
Royal Flush	Atlantic City, New Jersey	May 12–14, 2017	Singles	331	US$8,310	C9 | Mango	[A] Armada	Liquid`Hungrybox	DruggedFox	
Royal Flush	Atlantic City, New Jersey	May 12–14, 2017	Doubles	87	US$1,760	Armada, Android	Leffen, Ice	S2J, Shroomed	The Moon, DJ Nintendo	
Smash'N'Splash 3	Wisconsin Dells, Wisconsin	June 2–4, 2017	Singles	848	US$5,000	Hungrybox	Leffen	Armada	Shroomed	
Smash'N'Splash 3	Wisconsin Dells, Wisconsin	June 2–4, 2017	Doubles	390	US$1,500	Armada, Android	SFAT, PewPewU	Shroomed, S2J	Plup, Axe	
EVO 2017	Las Vegas, Nevada	July 14–16, 2017	Singles	1428	Unknown	Armada	Mango	Hungrybox	Mew2King	
DreamHack Atlanta 2017	Atlanta, Georgia	July 21–23, 2017	Singles	402	US$10,000	Plup	Hungrybox	Mew2King	Axe	
DreamHack Atlanta 2017	Atlanta, Georgia	July 21–23, 2017	Doubles	95	US$1,000	Mew2King, Plup	Ryan Ford, Colbol	Hungrybox, Crunch	SFAT, HomeMadeWaffles	
Get on My Level 2017	Mississauga, Ontario	July 28–30, 2017	Singles	566	Unknown	Leffen	Hungrybox	The Moon	SFAT	
Get on My Level 2017	Mississauga, Ontario	July 28–30, 2017	Doubles	110	Unknown	Leffen, Ice	SFAT, Shroomed	Hungrybox, Westballz	The Moon, DJ Nintendo	
Super Smash Con 2017	Chantilly, Virginia	August 10–13, 2017	Singles	1092	Unknown	Mango	Mew2King	Plup	Hungrybox	
Super Smash Con 2017	Chantilly, Virginia	August 10–13, 2017	Doubles	235	Unknown	SFAT, PewPewU	Mew2King, Plup	Axe, Westballz	Swedish Delight, MikeHaze	
Shine 2017	Boston, Massachusetts	August 25–27, 2017	Singles	1156	US$11,560	Liquid`Hungrybox	C9 | Mango	Tempo | S2J	FOX MVG | Mew2King	
The Big House 7	Detroit, Michigan	October 6–8, 2017	Singles			Liquid`Hungrybox	PG | Plup	TSM | Leffen	[A] Armada	
GENESIS 5	Oakland, California	January 19–21, 2018	Singles	1365	US$14630	PG | Plup	Liquid`Hungrybox	TSM | Leffen	[A] Armada	
Smash 'N' Splash 4	Wisconsin Dells, Wisconsin	June 1–3, 2018	Singles	924	US$14240	[A] Armada	Liquid`Hungrybox	TSM | Leffen	FOX MVG | Mew2King	
EVO 2018	Las Vegas, Nevada	August 3–5, 2018	Singles	1353	US$13530	TSM | Leffen	[A] Armada	PG | Plup	Liquid`Hungrybox	
Super Smash Con 2018	Chantilly, Virginia	August 9–12, 2018	Singles			[A] Armada	FOX MVG | Mew2King	Liquid`Hungrybox	CLG | PewPewU	
Shine 2018	Boston, Massachusetts	August 24–26, 2018	Singles			PG | Zain	Liquid`Hungrybox	C9 | Mango	PG | Plup	
The Big House 8	Detroit, Michigan	October 5–7, 2018	Singles			Liquid`Hungrybox	PG | Plup	C9 | Mango	PG | Zain	
Smash Summit 7	Los Angeles, California	November 15–18, 2018	Singles			Liquid`Hungrybox	TSM | Leffen	C9 | Mango	Wizzrobe	
GENESIS 6	Oakland, California	February 1–3, 2019	Singles	1113	US$11,130	Liquid`Hungrybox	Tempo | Axe	PG | Plup	RB VGBC | aMSa	
Pound 2019	Laurel, Maryland	April 19–21, 2019	Singles	449		Liquid'Hungrybox	C9 | Mango	PG | Plup	PG | Zain	
CEO 2019	Daytona Beach, Florida	June 28–30, 2019	Singles	329	US$3,300	Liquid'Hungrybox	Wizzrobe	CLG SFAT	iBDW	
The Big House 9	Detroit, Michigan	October 4–6, 2019	Singles	909	US$9,090	Mang0	Zain	Leffen	Fiction	
Genesis 7	Oakland, California	January 24–26, 2020	Singles	1,110	US$15,058	Zain	Hungrybox	Mang0	Hax$	
Genesis 7	Oakland, California	January 24–26, 2020	Doubles	476	US$4,760	Mew2King, Plup	PewPewU, SFAT	Rocky, Azel	Ralph, Darkatma	
Smash Summit 9	Los Angeles, California	February 13–16, 2020	Singles	18	US$68,251.56	Liquid'Hungrybox	PG | Plup	C9 | Mango	GG | Zain	
Ludwig Ahgren Championship Series 2	Online tournament	July 25–26, 2020	Singles	64	US$25,001	Zain	Mang0	iBDW	Plup	
Smash Summit 10 Online	Online tournament	November 19–22, 2020	Singles	20	US$14,820	Zain	Mang0	iBDW	Wizzrobe	
Smash Summit 10 Online	Online tournament	November 19–22, 2020	EU Singles	16	US$3,000	Leffen	Professor Pro	Trif	Pipsqueak	
Ludwig Ahgren Championship Series 3	Online tournament	December 19–20, 2020	Singles	64	US$25,002	Mang0	iBDW	Wizzrobe	Axe	
Smash Summit 11	Los Angeles, California	July 15–18, 2021	Singles	16	US$155,372	Mang0	Zain	Hungrybox	Plup	
Riptide 2021	Sandusky, Ohio	September 10–12, 2021	Singles	738	US$7,380	iBDW	Plup	Hungrybox	SFAT	
Riptide 2021	Sandusky, Ohio	September 10–12, 2021	Doubles	208	US$2,080	Hungrybox, Plup	Wizzrobe, Gahtzu	iBDW, SFAT	Tempo, xRunRiot	
Mainstage 2021	Ontario, California	November 12–14, 2021	Singles	559	US$5,590	Wizzrobe	Hungrybox	KoDoRiN	SFAT	
Mainstage 2021	Ontario, California	November 12–14, 2021	Doubles	204	US$2,040	Shroomed, S2J	iBDW, Fiction	bobby big ballz, SFOP	Wizzrobe, Gahtzu	
Smash Summit 12	Los Angeles, California	December 9–12, 2021	Singles	16	US$56,594	iBDW	Mang0	Zain	Wizzrobe	
Smash World Championship 2021	Orlando, Florida	December 17–19, 2021	Championship	40	US$75,000	Plup	Wizzrobe	Polish	Trif	
Smash World Championship 2021	Orlando, Florida	December 17, 2021	Last Chance Qualifier	240		Top 8 qualified into Championship Bracket				
Genesis 8	Oakland, California	April 15–17, 2022	Singles	1,552	US$23,280	Zain	Jmook	iBDW	n0ne	
Genesis 8	Oakland, California	April 15–17, 2022	Doubles	456	US$4,560	aMSa, Plup	Ralph, Darkatma	FatGoku, Ginger	Krudo, Panda	
Super Smash Con 2022	Chantilly, Virginia	August 11–14, 2022	Singles	713		Mang0	Hungrybox	lloD	Zain	
Super Smash Con 2022	Chantilly, Virginia	August 11–14, 2022	Doubles	238		Krudo, Stango	Polish, Drephen	Zuppy, bobby big ballz	joepesci, Darktooth	
Shine 2022	Worcester, Massachusetts	August 26–28, 2022	Singles	475		Zain	Jmook	Hungrybox	Axe	
Shine 2022	Worcester, Massachusetts	August 26–28, 2022	Doubles	200		Krudo, Panda	essy, Polish	Jmook, KoDoRiN	bobbybigballz, Salt	
Riptide 2022	Sandusky, Ohio	September 9–11, 2022	Singles	449		Hungrybox	Plup	Jmook	S2J	
Riptide 2022	Sandusky, Ohio	September 9–11, 2022	Doubles	162		Hungrybox, Plup	Drephen, Axe	Free Palestine, Polish	Azel, Prince Abu	
Lost Tech City 2022	San Antonio, Texas	September 30-October 2, 2022	Singles	154		Mang0	Plup	Hungrybox	aMSa	
Lost Tech City 2022	San Antonio, Texas	September 30-October 2, 2022	Doubles	58		Hungrybox, Plup	Mang0, SFAT	aMSa, Axe	bobby big ballz, Salt	
The Big House 10	Detroit, Michigan	October 7–9, 2022	Singles	982		aMSa	Mang0	iBDW	Zain	
The Big House 10	Detroit, Michigan	October 7–9, 2022	Doubles	364		Jmook, iBDW	FatGoku, Ginger	Darkatma, Ralph	aMSa, SluG	
Ludwig Smash Invitational	Las Vegas, Nevada	October 21–23, 2022	Last Chance Qualifier	60		Top 8 qualified into Singles Bracket				
Ludwig Smash Invitational	Las Vegas, Nevada	October 21–23, 2022	Singles	32	US$52,502	Zain	Hungrybox	Leffen	SluG	
Smash Summit 14	Los Angeles, California	November 3–6, 2022	Singles	16		Mang0	iBDW	aMSa	Hungrybox	
Smash Summit 14	Los Angeles, California	November 3–6, 2022	Doubles	N/A						
Apex 2022	Secaucus, New Jersey	November 18–20, 2022	Singles	461		aMSa	Zain	Hungrybox	iBDW	
Apex 2022	Secaucus, New Jersey	November 18–20, 2022	Doubles	162		Jmook, iBDW	aMSa, Axe	moky, n0ne	Spark, Polish	
Scuffed World Tour	Los Angeles, California	December 18, 2022	Singles	16	$25,000	aMSa	Hungrybox	Mang0	Axe	
