= Axe (gamer) =

American professional esports player

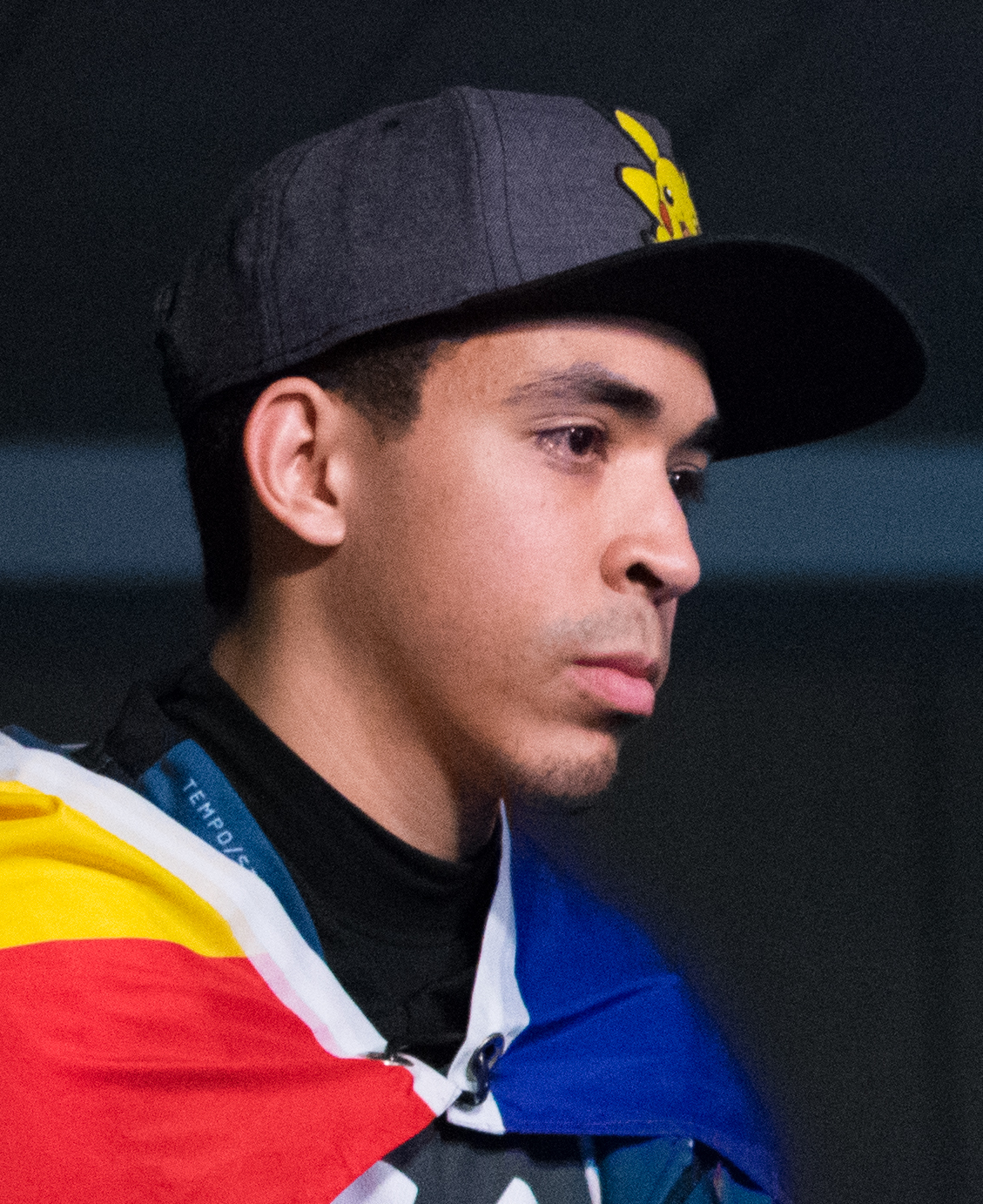
- Williamson in 2018

Personal information
- Name: Jeffrey Williamson
- Born: April 7, 1991 (age 35); Germany
- Nationality: American

Career information
- Game: Super Smash Bros. Melee
- Playing career: 2007–present

Team history
- 2014–2015: Mortality eSports
- 2015: Most Valuable Gaming
- 2015–present: Tempo Storm

Career highlights and awards
- Smash Summit 8 champion (2019)

Twitch information
- Channel: AZ_Axe
- Followers: 73,200
- Last updated: April 12, 2024

Jeffrey Williamson (born 1991), known professionally as Axe, is an American professional Super Smash Bros. Melee player. As of 2025, he is ranked as the 7th best Melee player in the world and has finished in the top ten of formal rankings presented by Red Bull and esports team Panda Global every year between 2016 and 2022. Some of his notable tournament placements at major Melee tournaments include first place at Smash Summit 8, second place at GENESIS 6, and fifth place at EVO 2014.

Williamson has primarily competed using Pikachu and is widely considered to be the best Melee Pikachu player of all time. Commentators have noted his fast-paced style of play. He has been sponsored by the esports team Tempo Storm since 2015. A 2021 list compiled by PGstats ranked Williamson as the twelfth-greatest Melee player of all time.

== Career ==
=== Early career and sponsorship (2007–2015) ===
Williamson started playing Super Smash Bros. Melee upon its release in 2001. He would only discover the competitive Super Smash Bros. scene five years later when he competed in his first tournament in high school. He formally became involved with the competitive scene after he started attending local tournaments in 2007, taking inspiration for his handle "Axe" from the Axe product brand. By the end of the year, he became one of the top ten Melee players in the rankings for his home state of Arizona. He began competing at national tournaments after attending Genesis in 2009, and was ranked as the best player in his state's rankings in 2010. After defeating several high-ranked players at Apex 2010, he began to solidify his status as a top player through high placements at major tournaments.

In 2014, Williamson tied for 5th place at MLG Anaheim after defeating top player Juan "Hungrybox" DeBiedma. In July, he signed a sponsorship deal with esports team Mortality eSports, and quit his job later that year to fully dedicate his time to professional competition. He has also been affiliated with esports team Most Valuable Gaming. Representing Mortality eSports, Williamson tied for 5th place at EVO 2014, where he notably defeated Otto "Silent Wolf" Bisno, completing a four-stock in Game 3 in under a minute. He departed from Mortality eSports after six months. In April 2015, he attended MVG Sandstorm, a national tournament, where he placed in third after defeating top players William "Leffen" Hjelte and Joseph "Mang0" Marquez. In July, he signed a sponsorship deal with Tempo Storm alongside fellow Melee professional Weston "Westballz" Dennis. Later that month, he tied for 7th place at EVO 2015. In October, he placed in 17th at The Big House 5.

=== Formal ranking and continued success (2016–present) ===
Williamson attended GENESIS 3 in January 2016, and took 4th place after defeating top players Mang0 and Zachary "SFAT" Cordoni. Subsequently, he placed in at least 6th place at EGLX 2016, CEO 2016, and Super Smash Con 2016. For his overall performance through 2016, he was ranked as the ninth best Melee player by SSBMRank, a biannual power ranking presented by Red Bull. He began 2017 with a 7th-place finish at GENESIS 4, and continued to attend many major tournaments through the first half of the year. He was one of sixteen top Melee players invited to Smash Summit Spring 2017 in March, where he placed in 5th. He subsequently took 3rd place at CEO 2017, and then tied for 9th place at EVO 2017 after losing to Adam "Armada" Lindgren. In the second half of the year, he took 4th place at DreamHack Atlanta 2017, 3rd place at DreamHack Denver 2017, and 5th place at Smash Summit 5, with the latter two performances including victories against Jason "Mew2King" Zimmerman. Williamson was ranked as the seventh best player in 2017 by SSBMRank.

The first major Melee tournament of 2018 was GENESIS 5, where Williamson tied for 7th place. Subsequent performances included a 9th-place finish at EGLX 2018, 2nd place at Flatiron 3, and 3rd place at Get On My Level 2018, defeating Leffen and Mew2King at the latter two tournaments, respectively. The latter portion of the year included a victory at Runback 2018, a local Arizona tournament, as well as a 5th-place finish at Smash Summit 7, a major tournament. Panda Global Rankings, a biannual power ranking that superseded SSBMRank, ranked Williamson as the tenth best Melee player in 2018. Williamson took 2nd place at the first two major tournaments of 2019, GENESIS 6 and Get On My Level 2019, after losing to the number one-ranked Hungrybox in the finals of both tournaments.

Later that year he won Smash Summit 8 after defeating Justin "Wizzrobe" Hallett in the finals. With this victory, he became the first player to win a major Melee tournament using Pikachu, a character often described as being in the "mid-tier" of the game's roster of characters in terms of fighting ability. In September, Williamson placed 2nd at Mainstage 2019. He was ranked as the fourth best player in the Panda Global Rankings for his performance in 2019.

Before the Panda Global Rankings suspended the 2020 competitive season amidst the COVID-19 pandemic, Williamson attended Smash Summit 9 in February. He tied for 5th place at the tournament, after losing to Mang0 in the quarterfinals. In November, he tied for 13th place at Smash Summit 10, an online tournament. He finished 7th at Smash Summit 14 in November 2022.

== Style of play ==
Williamson mainly competes using Pikachu, and is considered to be the best Pikachu player in the world. In a 2016 interview, Williamson stated that he chose to continue using the character in Melee after originally playing the character in Super Smash Bros., the first installment in the Super Smash Bros. series. Esports journalists have highlighted the complexity and speed of his style of play, which incorporates "tricky movement options" and "lightning-quick movement" that allows him to anticipate his opponent's attacks and swiftly retaliate against them.

== Personal life ==
Williamson was born in 1991 in Germany to parents in the U.S. military. He was raised in Sierra Vista, Arizona. He has two older siblings.
