= Evo 2016 =

Fighting game event in Las Vegas, Nevada

2016 Evolution Championship Series

Tournament information
- Location: Las Vegas, Nevada, United States
- Dates: July 15–17, 2016
- Tournament format: Double elimination
- Venue(s): Las Vegas Convention Center; Mandalay Bay Events Center

Final positions
- Champions: SFV: Seon-woo "Infiltration" Lee; SSBM: Juan "Hungrybox" Debiedma; GGXrdR: Masahiro "Machaboo" Tominaga; UMvC3: Christopher "NYChrisG" Gonzalez; MKXL: Dominique "SonicFox" McLean; KI: Darnell "Sleep" Waller; PT: Hisharu "Tonosama" Abe; SSB4: Elliot "Ally" Carroza-Oyarce; T7:FR: Jin-woo "Saint" Choi

Tournament statistics
- Attendance: 15,000

The 2016 Evolution Championship Series (commonly referred to as Evo 2016 or EVO 2016) was a fighting game event held in Las Vegas on July 15–17. Being hosted on the twentieth anniversary of the Evolution Championship Series, the event offered tournaments for various video games, including Street Fighter V, Super Smash Bros. Melee, and Pokkén Tournament. Participation reached record-breaking numbers, with over 5,000 people registering for the Street Fighter competition alone. 2016 was the first time the Evo Grand Finals were held in an arena and were broadcast by ESPN2 in addition to Twitch.

The Street Fighter V competition was won by Infiltration, winning over $50,000 USD, with second place going to Fuudo. Hungrybox won the Super Smash Bros. Melee competition for the first time, defeating previous champion Armada with a one-stock difference. Super Smash Bros. for Wii U was won by Elliot "Ally" Carroza-Oyarce for the first time.

== Venue ==
The elimination rounds of each game took place in the Las Vegas Convention Center on July 15 and 16, 2016. The grand finals were held in the 12,000-seat Mandalay Bay Events Center and featured five of the nine games: Street Fighter V, Super Smash Bros. Melee, Marvel vs Capcom, Mortal Kombat X, and Guilty Gear. This was the first year the first rounds of Evo took place in a convention center rather than a ballroom. Street Fighter broadcaster Ryan "Gootecks" Gutierrez stated to ESPN that "for it to be at the convention center is a huge step in the right direction. Evo is a little more spread out this year, but that's what happens to large events in Las Vegas."

== Games ==
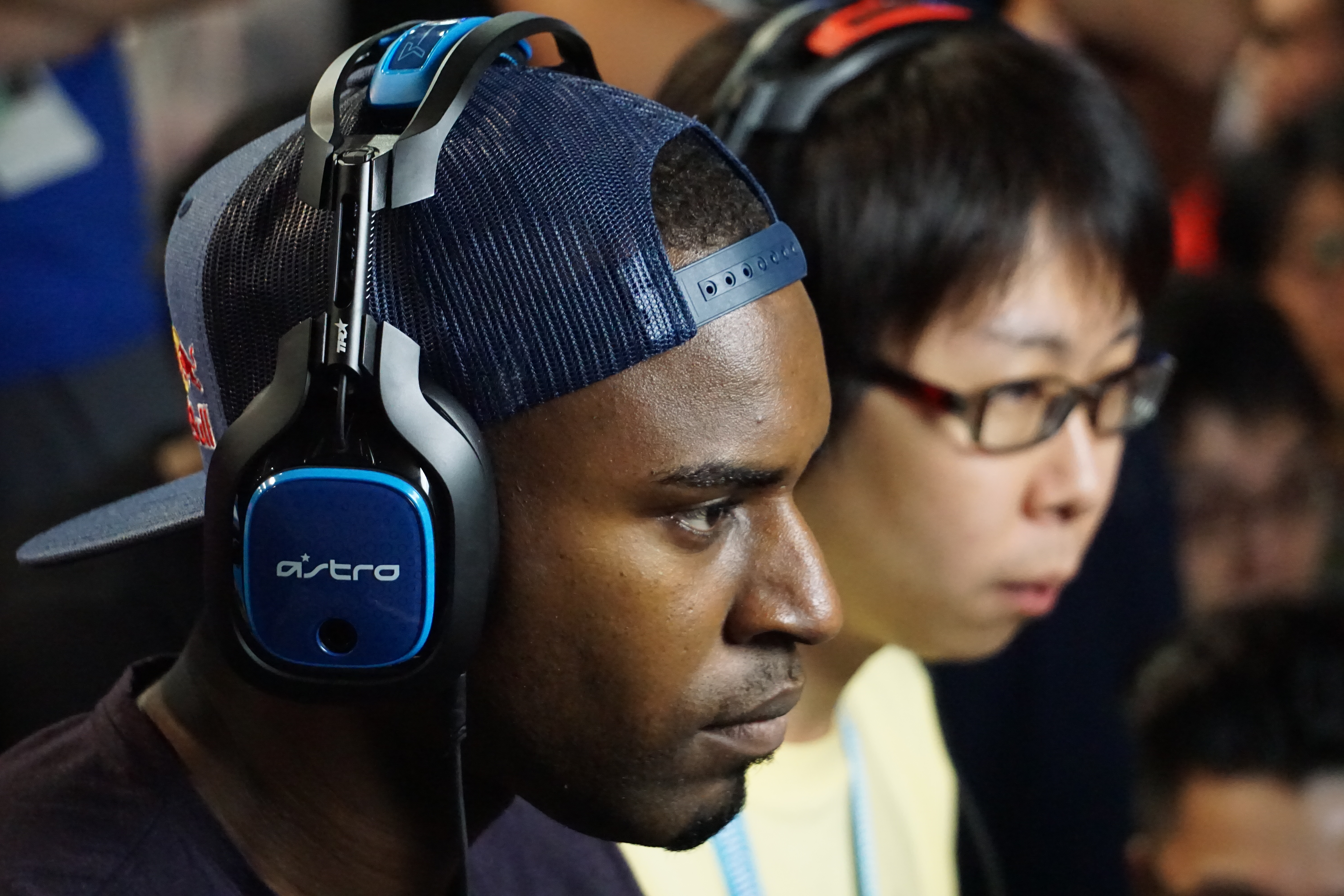
Darryl "Snake Eyez" Lewis (left) and Goichi "GO1-3151" Kishida at Evo 2016.

The nine games played at Evo 2016 were announced in January 2016 during a special announcement stream on Twitch, with event co-founder Joey Cuellar discussing the inclusion of each game. The games set to be contested were largely very recent releases. Street Fighter V would be added to the tournament for the first time, effectively replacing Street Fighter IV, which had been a competition mainstay since EVO 2009. Another new arrival was Namco Bandai's Pokkén Tournament, a Pokémon-based fighting game that was available in Japanese arcades at the time and would see a Wii U release later that year. Evo 2016 marked the fifth year Super Smash Bros. Melee at EVO, having previously been at EVO during the 2007, 2013-2015 editions. Melee's second sequel, Super Smash Bros. for Wii U joined the lineup along with its predecessor as with 2015's edition. Super Smash Bros. fans lobbied for the former's return due to their belief that it is the "ideal version" in the series for competitive tournaments. Many of the other video games were set to receive major DLC or an updated release in 2016.

The nine games competed at Evo 2016 were:

- Street Fighter V
- Super Smash Bros. Melee
- Super Smash Bros. for Wii U
- Guilty Gear Xrd Revelator
- Mortal Kombat X
- Pokkén Tournament
- Killer Instinct
- Ultimate Marvel vs. Capcom 3
- Tekken 7: Fated Retribution

Veteran player Justin Wong stated in an interview with ESPN that he would like to see Street Fighter IV stay relevant in the fighting game community after the release of its sequel, suggesting that it would benefit the dominant Japanese scene. Meanwhile, community members Ryan "Gootecks" Gutierrez and David "ultradavid" Graham stated that Street Fighter IV not being there was "the right call", as according to Graham, "the only times they've ever had multiple games from the same series is when those games have significantly different player bases," such as with Super Smash Bros. during this year's Championships.

=== Side events ===
Brawlout, a Super Smash Bros.-inspired fighting game by Angry Mob Games, set for release in the first quarter of 2017, was one of the video games playable at the Evo 2016 Indie Showcase. Side events were held throughout the weekend, including an event for the upcoming King of Fighters XIV, a competitive Catherine tournament, and a Mobile Suit Gundam: Extreme Vs. Full Boost tournament.

== Participants ==
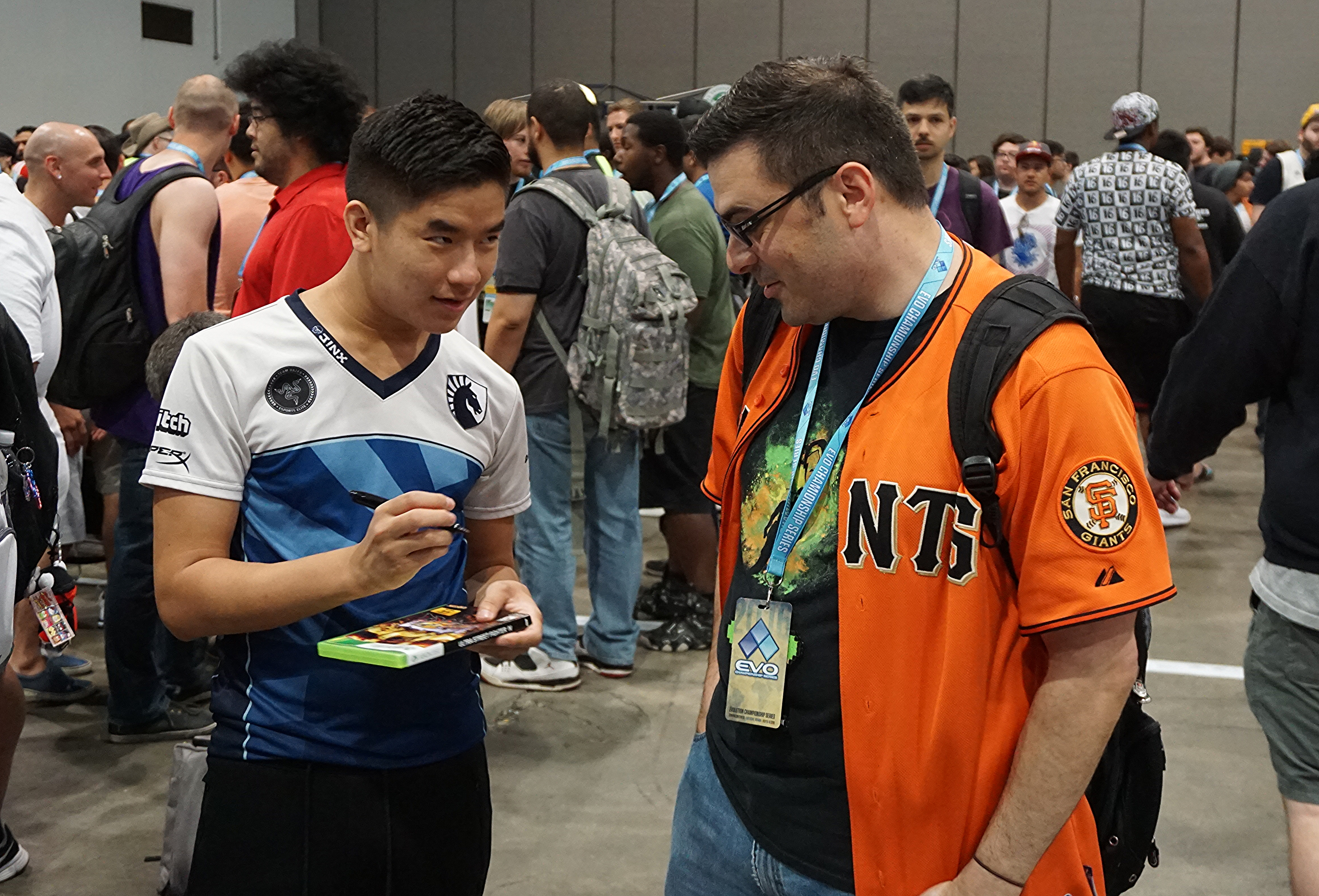
Team Liquid's NuckleDu (left) at Evo 2016

The Evolution Championship Series has historically been the largest fighting game tournament in the world, allowing free registration for anyone who wants to compete. Registration for the event closed on July 1, shortly after which the organization announced that the event had reached record-breaking entrant numbers. The Street Fighter V tournament had 5,107 registered entrants, making the biggest single-location tournament in fighting game history, doubling the number of entrants for Ultra Street Fighter IV the previous year. Evo 2016 also broke records for largest Super Smash Bros. tournament (2,662 entrants for Wii U, and 2,372 for Melee), largest Pokken Tournament tournament (1,180 entrants), and largest Killer Instinct tournaments (546 entrants). Guilty Gear Xrd Revelator saw 910 entrants, while Ultimate Marvel vs Capcom 3 and Mortal Kombat XL both saw over 700 competitors (782 for the former, 713 for the latter). Tekken 7: Fated Retribution reached a turn-out of 549 competitors.

Evo 2016 had around 15,000 attendees, most of which competed in at least one tournament. According to Evo co-founder Tom Cannon, players from 72 countries were set to compete in the event.

== Broadcasting ==
ESPN2 televised the finals of the Street Fighter V tournament on July 17. The program was also made available through WatchESPN. Vice president of programming and acquisitions, ESPN Digital Media, John Lasker, stated that "the Street Fighter V World Championship will be one of the must-see competitions from the Evo finals," while Joey Cuellar, chief executive officer of Evo, stated that the organization was "excited to bring the energy and excitement of our world finals to a wider audience."

As every year, the entire tournament was streamed through the Twitch streaming service. The tournament was broadcast across six different streams: four Evo-run streams provided coverage of all games throughout the weekend, while Capcom ran its own stream that featured additional coverage of Street Fighter V on Friday and Saturday, and Namco provided a stream with additional coverage of Tekken 7.

The hype video made for Evo 2016's Street Fighter V finals featured a track by Lupe Fiasco titled "Killers", which was made specifically for the video.

== Tournament summary ==
=== Street Fighter V ===
==== Background ====
There are no gods in Street Fighter V. No match-up has been solved, no mechanics perfected, and players are learning new elements every day.

— —Eric van Allen, Paste Magazine

Street Fighter V made its Evo debut in 2016, despite its launch earlier that year being less than optimal, with the game missing a story mode and basic multiplayer features. Eric van Allen of Paste Magazine stated that "this was not a game polished and prepped, but released early in order to make the cut for the e-sports season." Van Allen also stated that the season of competitive Street Fighter before Evo was dynamic, with many new players rising to the top and sinking just as fast and strategies shifting on a weekly basis. Only two weeks prior to Evo 2016, two new characters (Balrog and Ibuki) were introduced to the game, and both were legal to play in the tournament. Regardless, players and commentators frequently mentioned how fun the game is to learn.

Joseph Bradford described the Top 8 Street Fighter finalists as "an interesting bunch", as fan-favorite players like Yusuke Momochi, Tokido, Daigo Umehara, Justin Wong, and Eduardo "PR Balrog" Perez were all eliminated beforehand. The finalists included six Japanese players – Fuudo, MOV, Yukadon, Nemo, Goichi Kishida, and Eita – one Korean player: Infiltration – and one United States player: Joseph "L.I. Joe" Ciaramelli. Bradford stated that many of marquee match-ups that many Evo viewers were looking forward to happening during the final elimination rounds on July 16, including match between Daigo Umehara and Justin Wong, which was won by the latter. Infiltration beat Gamerbee during the elimination rounds as well.

==== Grand Finals ====
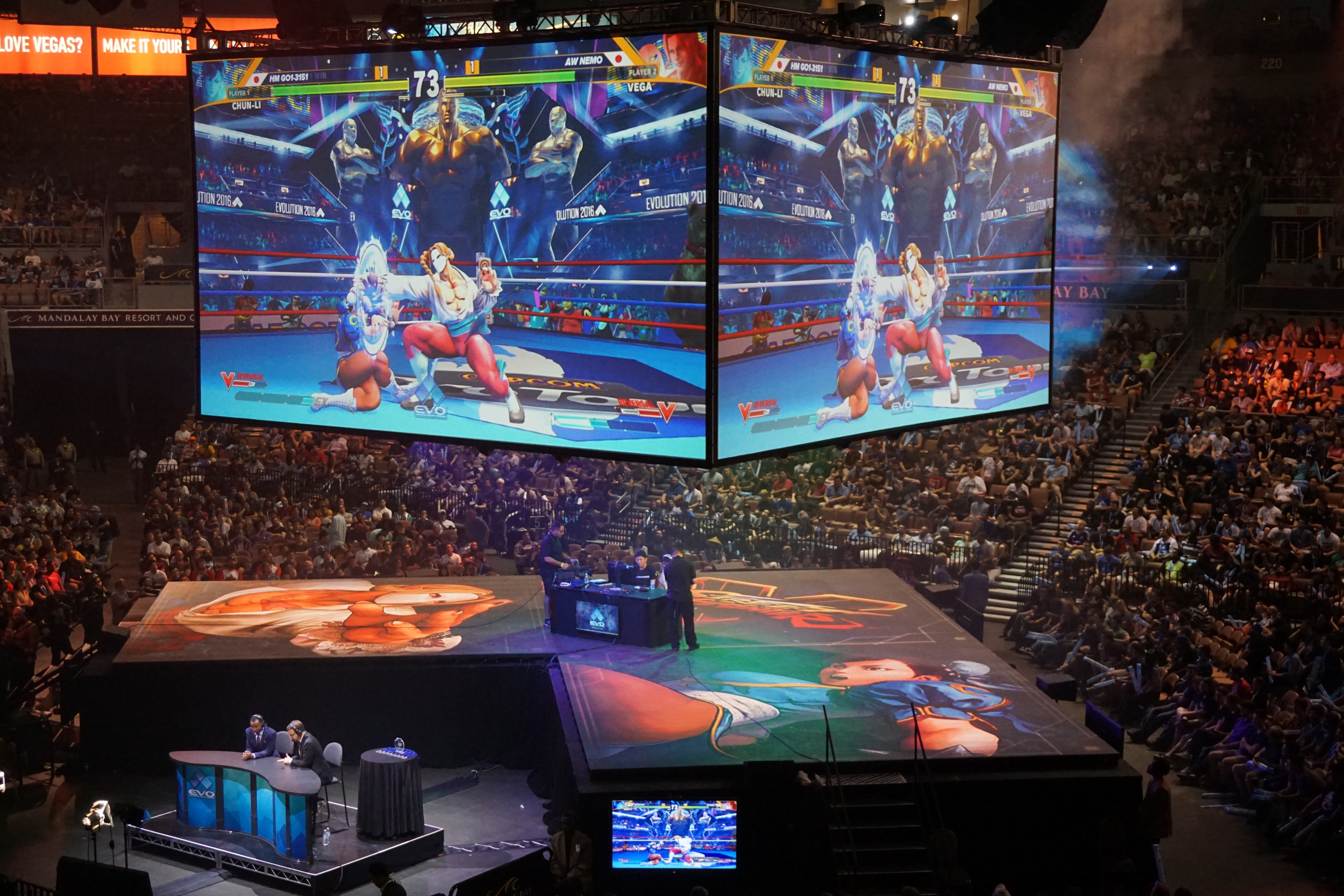
Street Fighter V being played at the Mandalay Bay Events Center

Infiltration, who came in third behind Gamerbee and Momochi during Evo 2015, lost against Fuudo during the first round of the winner's bracket of the Street Fighter Top 8, but both achieved a series of wins throughout the rest of the tournament and the two faced of again in the finals. Here, Infiltration beat Fuudo, delivering three perfect rounds. When asked what adjustments he had made to his strategy, Infiltration responded simply with "download complete", suggesting he had identified and understood Fuudo's techniques when he was matched against him for the second time.

L.I. Joe, the sole American player, was a fan-favorite during the Grand Finals: him defeating Eita in a "thrilling match" whipped the Las Vegas crowd in a frenzy, though he lost to Yukadon later on. FanSided's Daniel George stated that L.I. Joe handled his loss "with the grace of a champion."

The Street Fighter V Grand Finals were successful among TV audiences watching it on ESPN2, and the tournament reached a peak viewership of 194,000 viewers on the official Twitch stream. Capcom released new downloadable content during the Evo Grand Finals, including a new stage that includes banners that change depending on the event that is taking place at the time.

=== Super Smash Bros. Melee ===
Armada, Hungrybox and Mango, who had dominated most major Melee tournaments in 2016 and perched at the top of the rankings, all competed at Evo 2016. Anna Washenko of Mashable stated up front that "the big question for Evo this year is who, if anyone, will be on their game enough to challenge this seemingly unshakeable top tier." Other high-ranked players that competed included Mew2King, Plup, Westballz, Axe, Shroomed, Wobbles, and Wizzrobe. Kevin "PPMD" Nanney withdrew from the event two weeks prior due to health concerns, while William "Leffen" Hjelte missed Evo 2016 due to ongoing visa issues that had kept him out of the United States since late 2015.

Hungrybox matched off against returning champion Armada after beating Mango in the loser's bracket semifinals and Plup in the loser's finals. Armada played Fox in order to play against Hungrybox' Jigglypuff in his advantage, but lost the first two games. Armada made a comeback in the two games after that, but Hungrybox turned it around again and managed to reset the set. Hungrybox and Armada then went back and forth trading games, until Hungrybox beat Armada with a single stock left in the fifth game of the second set, winning the tournament.

=== Super Smash Bros. for Wii U ===
The Evo 2016 Super Smash Bros. for Wii U competition featured a large variety of characters, both conventional and unconventional. Although many favorites had made Top 8, there were many unexpected upsets that caused several top players to finish outside top 16. Unsponsored player Elliot "Ally" Carroza-Oyarce ended up claiming the grand title, after reaching the Super Smash Bros. for Wii U Evo Top 8 twice before. Takuto "Kamemushi" finished 2nd on his first time entering an overseas tournament, after making waves in Japan with then considered mid-tier Mega-Man, notably eliminating Gonzalo "ZeRo" Barrios. The tournament's schedule was a common complaint, due to it being the second-largest tournament at the event. The competition's tight schedule put some serious strain on some of the event's competitors.

=== Pokkén Tournament ===
Pokkén Tournament's Nintendo-approved presence at Evo 2016 was notable as just three years prior, Nintendo attempted to block Super Smash Bros. Melee from the tournament. Yet, the inclusion of the game was also controversial among fighting game fans as popular fighting games like Street Fighter IV and Blazblue were bumped from the event in favor of Pokkén Tournament. Players from across the world traveled to Las Vegas in order to see how they would match up against the game's Japanese playerbase, where the game was released for a much longer time. Red Bull's Ian Walker stated that Pokkén Tournament grew a strong community at Evo 2016, with many low-level players enjoying being among like-minded players. Walker suggested that due to the game's younger player-base, it could go on to bolster the fighting game community strongly.

Some well known fighting game players joined the Pokkén Tournament competition, including Justin Wong, Steven "Coach Steve" Delgado, and Yuta "Abadango" Kawamura. Meanwhile, Omari "BadIntent" Travis, made a switch from the competitive scene of the main Pokémon role-playing series to Pokkén Tournament. The tournament was won by Japanese player Hisharu "Tonosama" Abe. Because they reached the Grand Finals, Tonosama and runner-up Buntan directly qualified for the Pokkén Championship World Finals.

=== Tekken 7: Fated Retribution ===
Though the game was not publicly available in the United States during the event, the Tekken 7 tournament was won by Korean player Saint, who defeated fellow-Korean player Knee in the finals 3–2.

One of the highlights of the Tekken 7 tournament was Korean Street Fighter V player Chung-gon "Poongko" Lee and his character choice of Street Fighter's Akuma; who functions very similar to his appearance in the Street Fighter IV series. Poongko notably upset EVO 2015's 5th-place finisher Yota "Pekos" Kachi and made it all the way to Winner's Finals, but was subsequently double-eliminated by Saint and Knee to receive third place.

=== Guilty Gear Xrd Revelator ===
The Grand Finals of Guilty Gear Xrd Revelator were dominated by Japanese players, the highest six players all originating from the country. The competition saw Tominaga "Machaboo" Masahiro heading straight for a victory, almost beating Omito Hashimoto 3–0 in the finals, though the latter made a strong come-back and brought the Grand Finals back to 2-2 and close to a bracket reset. Machaboo managed to defeat Omito 3–2 in the end, winning the tournament. Viewership of the competition peaked at 133,000 on the main Twitch channel, marking a modest improvement from the largest total seen in Marvel vs Capcom 3.

== Reveals ==
At their panel, SNK announced that Garou: Mark of the Wolves would be receiving a PlayStation 4 and PlayStation Vita port courtesy of Code Mystics with cross-buy support, as part of the 25th Anniversary of the Fatal Fury franchise. Before the Killer Instinct grand finals between Flipside Tactics' Darnell "Sleep" Waller and Ultra Arcade's Kenneth "Bass" Armas begun, Iron Galaxy and Microsoft revealed Eyedol as the last character added for Killer Instinct: Season Three's lineup.

Shortly after the Guilty Gear Xrd -REVELATOR- finals had ended and right before the Super Smash Bros. Melee finals begun, Daisuke Ishiwatari went on the Mandalay Bay stage to showcase a trailer for the character Dizzy, who would be released the day after EVO 2016 ended. Between the Super Smash Bros. Melee and Street Fighter V finals; Tekken producer Katsuhiro Harada and Michael Murray went on the Mandalay Bay stage to reveal two characters for Tekken 7: Fated Retribution, one returning (Bob) and one new (Master Raven).

== Prize pool ==
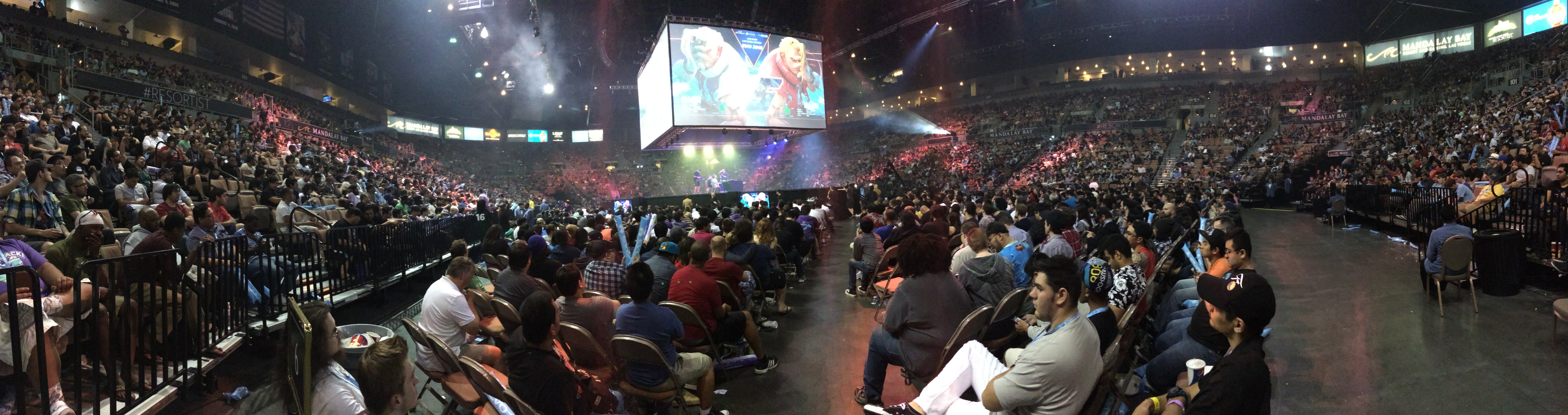
Panorama of the Mandalay Bay Events Center during Evo 2016

As with every year, base entry fees were US$10 per player for each tournament.

- Street Fighter V featured the largest prize pool for an open tournament in fighting game history. The top eight players shared a pot of over $100,000 USD, with just over half of the money going to the winner. US$50,000 was courtesy of Capcom due to the tournament's place on the Capcom Pro Tour.
- Pokkén Tournament featured a $10,000 bonus pot courtesy of The Pokémon Company as it was a Major Qualifier for the Pokkén Tournament Championship Series. The total pot was around US$20,000.
- Mortal Kombat XL received US$50,000 from NetherRealm and Warner Bros. The total pot was around US$57,000.
- Killer Instinct received US$15,000 from the KI Ultra Tour funding. The total pot was around US$20,000.
- Guilty Gear Xrd -REVELATOR-'s bonus pot was US$10,000 coming from North American publisher Aksys Games. The total pot was around US$19,000.

Every other game had a base pot which was formed from entrant fees based on final registration numbers.

== Controversy ==
After 19-year old commentator Victoria "VikkiKitty" Perez reported that she was sexually assaulted by Smash 4 player Cristian "Hyuga" Medina at Evo 2016, several members of the competitive Smash Bros. community called for Hyuga to be banned from future tournaments. VGBootCamp, the media organization producing live streams for Smash Bros. events, along with being Hyuga's former sponsor, cut all ties with Hyuga after they confirmed the allegations, though VikkiKitty did not consider taking legal action due to the impact it would have on her family. According to Medina, he did not recall the incident because he was blackout drunk.

The Ultimate Marvel vs. Capcom 3 Grand Final played host to a memorable incident, in which a shirtless man climbed on to the stage at Mandalay Bay Events Center and reportedly demanded to challenge NYChrisG, the newly crowned champion, to a game of UMvC3, before being escorted away by security. The man's identity remains unknown.

== Results ==
Street Fighter V
Place	Player	Alias and Team	Character(s)
1st	(South Korea) Seon-woo Lee	RZR|Infiltration	Nash, F.A.N.G
2nd	(Japan) Keita Ai	RZR|Fuudo	R. Mika
3rd	(Japan) Atsushi Fujimura	Yukadon	Nash
4th	(Japan) Goichi Kishida	HM|GO1-3151	Chun-Li
5th	(Japan) Joe Egami	MOV	Chun-Li
5th	(United States) Joe Ciaramelli	LI Joe	Nash
7th	(Japan) Naoki Nemoto	AW|Nemo	Vega
7th	(Japan) Hiroyuki Nagata	HM|Eita	Ken
9th	(United States) Kenneth Pope	Kenneth Pope	Necalli
9th	(Japan) Ryota Inoue	GGP|Kazunoko	Cammy
9th	(Taiwan) Bruce Hsiang	Twitch|GamerBee	Necalli
9th	(Singapore) Kun Xian Ho	RZR|Xian	F.A.N.G
13th	(Japan) Hajime Taniguchi	Tokido	Ryu
13th	(Taiwan) Li-wei Lin	ESR|OilKing	Rashid
13th	(United States) Justin Wong	EG|Justin Wong	Karin
13th	(United States) Gerald Anton Herrera	YP|Filipinoman	Chun-Li

Super Smash Bros. Melee
Place	Player	Alias and Team	Character(s)
1st	(United States) Juan Debiedma	Liquid|Hungrybox	Jigglypuff
2nd	(Sweden) Adam Lindgren	[A]|Armada	Peach, Fox
3rd	(United States) Justin McGrath	PG|Plup	Sheik, Fox
4th	(United States) Joseph Marquez	C9|Mang0	Falco, Fox
5th	(United States) Jason Zimmerman	FOX|Mew2King	Marth, Sheik
5th	(United States) Johnny Kim	Tempo|S2J	Captain Falcon
7th	(United States) Kevin Toy	CLG|PewPewU	Marth
7th	(United States) Weston Dennis	G2|Westballz	Falco, Fox
9th	(United States) James Ma	Duck	Samus
9th	(United States) James Liu	BERT|Swedish Delight	Sheik
9th	(United States) Julian Zhu	CG|Zhu	Falco
9th	(United States) DaJuan McDaniel	WFX|Shroomed	Sheik
13th	(United States) Michael Brancato	SPY|Nintendude	Ice Climbers
13th	(United States) Sami Muhanna	TGL|DruggedFox	Fox
13th	(United States) Jose Aldama	Selfless|Lucky	Fox
13th	(United States) Colin Green	SS|Colbol	Fox, Marth

Guilty Gear Xrd -REVELATOR-
Place	Player	Alias and Team	Character(s)
1st	(Japan) Masahiro Tominaga	Machaboo	Sin
2nd	(Japan) Omito Hashimoto	Omito	Johnny
3rd	(Japan) Hisatoshi Usui	Rion	Ky
4th	(Japan) Takahiro Kitano	Nakamura	Millia
5th	(Japan) Ryota Inoue	GGP|Kazunoko	Raven
5th	(Japan) Kenichi Ogawa	Ogawa	Zato-1
7th	(South Korea) Gyung-woo Yu	TopGaren	Zato-1
7th	(United States) Kyohei Lehr	PG|MarlinPie	Zato-1

Ultimate Marvel vs. Capcom 3
Place	Player	Alias and Team	Character(s)
1st	(United States) Christopher Gonzalez	NYChrisG	Morrigan/Doctor Doom/Vergil
2nd	(Chile) Nicolás González	KaneBlueRiver	Hulk/Sentinel/Haggar
3rd	(United States) Armando Mejia	BT|Angelic	Wolverine/Dormammu/Shuma-Gorath, Dormammu/Vergil/Shuma-Gorath
4th	(United States) Kevin Barrios	NB|DualKevin	Deadpool/Dante/Hawkeye
5th	(United States) Juan Corona	Priest	Magneto/M.O.D.O.K/Doctor Doom, M.O.D.O.K/Dormammu/Doctor Doom
5th	(United States) Vineeth Meka	ApologyMan	Firebrand/Doctor Doom/Super-Skrull
7th	(United States) Justin Wong	EG|Justin Wong	Wolverine/Storm/Akuma, Vergil/Storm/Akuma
7th	(United States) Luis Cervantes	Paradigm	Arthur/Rocket Raccoon/Haggar, Haggar/Dormammu/Doctor Doom, Haggar/Doctor Doom/Rocket Raccoon

Mortal Kombat XL
Place	Player	Alias and Team	Character(s)
1st	(United States) Dominique McLean	cR|SonicFox	Erron Black (Gunslinger), Alien (Acidic), Cassie Cage (Hollywood), Jason (Unstoppable)
2nd	(Bahrain) Sayed Hashim Ahmed	PLG|Tekken Master	Kotal Kahn (War God, Blood God), D'Vorah (Swarm Queen)
3rd	(United States) Brad Vaughn	PG|Scar	Sonya Blade (Demolition)
4th	(United States) Ryan DeDomenico	EVB|Big D	Ermac (Mystic, Spectral)
5th	(Canada) Alexandre Dubé-Bilodeau	Orbit.MTL|Hayatei	Takeda (Ronin, Lasher)
5th	(United States) Ryan Gonzalez	cR|Wound Cowboy	Shinnok (Bone Shaper)
7th	(United States) Michael Lerma	YOMI|Michaelangelo	Quan Chi (Summoner)
7th	(United States) Ryan Walker	EVB|Dragon	Alien (Acidic, Tarkatan)

Killer Instinct
Place	Player	Alias and Team	Character(s)
1st	(United States) Darnell Waller	F3|Sleep	Arbiter, Gargos
2nd	(United States) Kenneth Armas	UA|Bass	Spinal, Jago, Cinder
3rd	(United States) Jamill Boykin	BH|SeaDragon	Aria, Hisako
4th	(United States) Nicholas Iovene	Circa|Nicky	Fulgore
5th	(United States) Jacob Runsewe	RL|Runex	Omen, Rash
5th	(United States) Paul Ramos	Paul B	Sabrewulf, Hisako
7th	(United States) Josue Herrera	BH|Grief	Sadira, Aria
7th	(United States) Angel Gonzalez	GnarlyFeats	Orchid, Rash

Pokkén Tournament
Place	Player	Alias and Team	Character(s)
1st	(Japan) Hisharu Abe	Tonosama	Braixen, Sceptile
2nd	(Japan) Kazunori Ageta	Buntan	Suicune
3rd	(United States) Willie Barr	Swillo	Mewtwo
4th	(Japan) Masami Sato	Potetin	Mewtwo, Pikachu Libre, Weavile, Chandelure
5th	(United States) James Rosseel Jr.	RvL|Bosshog	Garchomp
5th	(United States) Christian Patierno	Circa|Suicune Master	Suicune
7th	(United States) Thomas Mclaurin	Thulius	Mewtwo
7th	(Japan) Kazuyuki Koji	KojiKOG	Charizard

Super Smash Bros. for Wii U
Place	Player	Alias and Team	Character(s)
1st	(Canada) Elliot Carroza-Oyarce	Ally	Mario
2nd	(Japan) Takuto Ono	Kamemushi	Mega Man, Cloud, Yoshi
3rd	(Chile) Gonzalo Barrios	TSM|ZeRo	Diddy Kong, Sheik
4th	(United States) James Makekau-Tyson	CLG|VoiD	Sheik
5th	(Japan) Ryuto Hayashi	Ranai	Villager
5th	(Japan) Yuta Kawamura	Abadango	Mewtwo, Rosalina & Luma
7th	(United States) Samuel Buzby	dT|Dabuz	Rosalina & Luma
7th	(United States) Larry Holland	eLv|Larry Lurr	Fox, Donkey Kong
9th	(Japan) Tomoyasu Yamakawa	Earth	Pit
9th	(United States) Vincent Cannino	iQHQ|Vinnie	Sheik
9th	(United States) Tyler Martins	Marss	Zero Suit Samus
9th	(United States) Alberto Miliziano	PG|Trela	Ryu
13th	(Japan) Kengo Suzuki	Naifu|KEN	Sonic
13th	(United States) Nairoby Quezada	Liquid|Nairo	Zero Suit Samus
13th	(United States) Eric Weber	SS|Mr. E	Marth
13th	(United States) Daniel Facey	VexX|Day	Lucario

Tekken 7: Fated Retribution
Place	Player	Alias and Team	Character(s)
1st	(South Korea) Jin-woo Choi	Saint	Jack-7
2nd	(South Korea) Jae-min Bae	Knee	Bryan, Akuma, Heihachi
3rd	(South Korea) Chung-gon Lee	Secret|Poongko	Akuma
4th	(United States) Anthony Jaimes	GeeseMaster	Feng
5th	(South Korea) Jung-joong Joo	Narakhof	Claudio
5th	(Japan) Nakayama Daichi	Yamasa|Nobi	Dragunov
7th	(United States) Stephen Stafford	Circa|Speedkicks	Hwoarang, Lars
7th	(Japan) Aoki Takehiko	Take	Bryan
