= List of Project M tournaments =

This list includes Project M tournament results.

== Major tournament results ==
Tournament	Location	Date	Format	Entrants	Prize pool	1st	2nd	3rd	4th
Apex 2014	Somerset, New Jersey	January 17–19, 2014	Singles	382	US$4,150	CT EMP | Armada	CT EMP | Mew2King	DEHF	Rolex
SKTAR 3	Somerset, New Jersey	May 31–June 1, 2014	Singles	256	US$2,560	Emukiller	P4K EMP | Mew2King	Reign | Professor Pro	ESAM
SKTAR 3	Somerset, New Jersey	May 31–June 1, 2014	Doubles	64	US$1,280	ZeRo, Rolex	Mew2King, Armada	DEHF, K9	ESAM, MVD
CEO 2014	Orlando, Florida	June 27–29, 2014	Singles	255	US$3,170	ZeRo	Wizzrobe	P4K EMP | Mew2King	MOR | ChuDat
CEO 2014	Orlando, Florida	June 27–29, 2014	Doubles	34	US$680	Wizzrobe, Plup	Mew2King, ZeRo	Chillin, ChuDat	Armada, Hungrybox
Zenith 2014	The NYU Game Center	August 2–3, 2014	Singles	281	US$3,455	ZeRo	Junebug	Emukiller	P4K EMP | Mew2King
Zenith 2014	The NYU Game Center	August 2–3, 2014	Doubles	60		Mew2King, ZeRo	Junebug, Pink Fresh	Rolex, Emukiller	Cruzy Cakes, Jreed
The Big House 4	Romulus, Michigan	October 4–5, 2014	Singles	333	US$3,300	ZeRo	VwS | Professor Pro	EMP P4K | Mew2King	Junebug
The Big House 4	Romulus, Michigan	October 4–5, 2014	Doubles	52	US$1,040	ZeRo, Mew2King	Wizzrobe, Plup	Junebug, Pink Fresh	Oro?!, Ripple
B.E.A.S.T 5	Hvitfeldtska gymnasiet	January 9–11, 2015	Singles	158	€790	C9 | Mango	VwS | Professor Pro	[A] Armada	Leffen
Smash 'N' Splash 2	Gurnee, Illinois	June 11–12, 2016	Singles	261		EE | Mr. Lz	FX | Lunchables	Marshall	Si S | ThundeRzReiGN
Smash 'N' Splash 2	Gurnee, Illinois	June 11–12, 2016	Doubles	69		Mr. Lz, Mew2King	Dakpo, Lunchables	Ally, Dirtboy	Ripple, Junebug
EVO 2016	Las Vegas, Nevada	July 15–17, 2016	Singles	142		Sosa	VGz | Junebug	VGz | Ilod	Hyperflame
Clutch City Clash	The Woodlands, Texas	August 6–7, 2016	Singles	106		R3 | Sosa	Si S | ThundeRzReiGN	FS | Boiko	Aero
Clutch City Clash	The Woodlands, Texas	August 6–7, 2016	Doubles	31		ThundeRzReiGN, Sosa	Ally, Mew2King	Aero, iPunchKidsz	Lunchables, Oracle
Olympus	Atlantic City, New Jersey	October 28–30, 2016	Singles	203	US$1000	Si S | ThundeRzReiGN	FX | Lunchables	Gallo	R3 | Sosa
Olympus	Atlantic City, New Jersey	October 28–30, 2016	Doubles	105	US$500	Dakpo, Lunchables	Darc, Silver	Junebug, Malachi	Sosa, Jose V
