= Evo 2018 =

Esports event in Las Vegas, Nevada

2018 Evolution Championship Series
- Evolution Championship Series logo

Tournament information
- Location: Las Vegas, Nevada, United States
- Dates: August 3–5, 2018
- Tournament format: Double elimination
- Venue: Mandalay Bay

Final positions
- Champions: SFVAE: Benjamin "Problem X" Simon; DBFZ: Dominique "SonicFox" McLean; T7: Sun-woong "LowHigh" Youn; SSBM: William "Leffen" Hjelte; GGXrdR2: Omito "OMITO" Hashimoto; SSB4: Bharat "Lima" Chintapall; BBTAG: Heiho; I2: Curtis "Rewind" McCall

Tournament statistics
- Attendance: ~10,000

The 2018 Evolution Championship Series (commonly referred to as Evo 2018 or EVO 2018) was a fighting game event held in Las Vegas on August 3 to 5 as part of the long-running Evolution Championship Series. The event offered tournaments for various video games, including Street Fighter V, Tekken 7, and Dragon Ball FighterZ. Over 10,000 people registered for the event with Dragon Ball FighterZ receiving the most entrants.

== Venue ==
Just like the previous edition of the event, Evo 2018 took place in the Mandalay Bay resort for all three days of the event. The first two days of the event were held at the Mandalay Bay Convention Center, and the final day was held at the Mandalay Bay Events Center.

== Games ==
The eight games played at Evo 2018 were announced on February 6, 2018, during a special announcement stream on Twitch, with event co-founder Joey Cuellar discussing the inclusion of each game. The games set to be contested consisted of new releases, FGC contemporaries, and updated releases. New additions included BlazBlue: Cross Tag Battle and Dragon Ball FighterZ while Street Fighter V: Arcade Edition would replace Street Fighter V. Regarding the Smash community, Super Smash Bros. Melee's finals were once again held during the Sunday Finals, contrast to its Saturday spot in the previous year. For the third consecutive year, the Street Fighter V: Arcade Edition tournament was a Capcom Pro Tour Premier event.

The eight games being competed in officially at Evo 2018 were:

- Street Fighter V: Arcade Edition
- Tekken 7
- Guilty Gear Xrd REV 2
- Injustice 2
- Super Smash Bros. Melee
- Super Smash Bros. for Wii U
- Dragon Ball FighterZ
- BlazBlue: Cross Tag Battle

When asked about the exclusion of Marvel vs. Capcom: Infinite, Joey Cuellar responded: "I don't think people are playing it, and that's the problem". This statement is a reflection of the title's status as a commercial failure. A side tournament for the game was conducted, however.

=== Side events ===
Evo featured competitions for many additional games as side events, such as Fighting EX Layer, Ultra Street Fighter IV, Super Street Fighter II Turbo, and Marvel vs. Capcom: Infinite. Exhibitions for then-upcoming fighters Dead or Alive 6, Super Smash Bros. Ultimate and Soulcalibur VI also took place.

As with the previous three years, the AnimEVO series of side tournaments, which is dedicated to airdasher fighting games, was held at the event with over twenty-six games to compete in, including Under Night In-Birth EXE: Late(st), Samurai Shodown V Special, Garou: Mark of the Wolves, Windjammers, and Catherine, as well as former EVO titles The King of Fighters XIV, BlazBlue: Central Fiction, Persona 4 Arena Ultimax and Tatsunoko vs. Capcom.

== Participants ==
The Evolution Championship Series has historically been the largest fighting game tournament in the world, allowing free registration for anyone who wants to compete. Registration for the event closed on July 20, which Joey "Mr. Wizard" Cuellar had announced the final registration numbers. The three largest games from last year: Street Fighter V, Super Smash Bros. for Wii U, and Super Smash Bros. Melee have once again seen decreases in numbers with the games going from 2622 to 2421, 1515 to 1303, and 1435 to 1302 respectively. Dragon Ball FighterZ became the first game in years to surpass the entrant numbers of a Street Fighter game becoming the most entered game at Evo 2018, the first for a non-Street Fighter game. Tekken 7 once again saw an increase in entrant numbers going from over 1,200 entrants to 1,504 becoming the third largest game at the event.

Evo 2018 has received over 11,000 attendees in competition.

== Broadcasting ==
As with every year since Evo 2012, the entire tournament is streamed through the Twitch streaming service. The tournament is broadcast across eight different streams: seven Evo-run streams provide coverage of all games throughout the weekend, while Capcom runs its signature Capcom Fighters stream that features coverage of Street Fighter V matches on Friday and Saturday. The EVO1 channel provides coverage of the show The Jump Off, which airs on EVO6 whenever an exhibition or Top 8 takes place.

== Reveals ==
Although it was not revealed at the event, during the Evo 2018 lineup reveal, Arc System Works announced Yang Xiao Long from RWBY as a DLC character for BlazBlue: Cross Tag Battle. Along with her announcement, the company stated that she and Blake Belladonna would be released free-of-charge, which would allow players to play as Team RWBY without having to pay for them.

On the Saturday of the tournament, to coincide with the game's inclusion among the AnimEVO side events, DotEmu announced a port of Windjammers for the Nintendo Switch. Shortly after the BlazBlue: Cross Tag Battle finals ended, Arc System Works revealed nine new characters for the title to be released as DLC on August 6: Izayoi, Nine the Phantom, and Mai Natsume of BlazBlue; Mitsuru Kirijo, Akihiko Sanada and Labrys of Persona 4 Arena; and Merkava, Yuzuriha Sougets, and Mika Returna of Under Night In-Birth. In addition, following the Fighting EX Layer side tournament, Arika revealed the game would be receiving an arcade port and announced a release window for forthcoming characters Pullum Purna and Vulcano Rosso. They also teased returning Street Fighter EX characters Area and Sharon and guest character Terry Bogard of Fatal Fury and The King of Fighters as future DLC.

Following Sunday's Guilty Gear Xrd REV 2 finals, Arc System Works announced an organized eSports circuit with the reveal of the ArcRevo World Tour. The circuit focuses on Guilty Gear Xrd REV 2, BlazBlue: Cross Tag Battle, and BlazBlue: Central Fiction. Prior to the Super Smash Bros. Melee grand final, Nintendo announced a special Nintendo Direct presentation for Super Smash Bros. Ultimate, which was later streamed on August 8. Before the Tekken 7 finals, Bandai Namco announced that Astaroth and Seong Mi-na would be playable in Soulcalibur VI./ At the end of the finals, series producer Katsuhiro Harada announced a second season of DLC for the Tekken 7, including six new playable characters. Three characters were revealed at the event: returning fighters Anna Williams and Lei Wulong, and special guest character Negan from The Walking Dead. After the Dragon Ball FighterZ finals concluded, Bandai Namco announced an August 8 release date for the game's fifth and sixth DLC characters, base form Goku and Vegeta, as well as a reveal trailer for the seventh DLC character, Cooler. Finally, just before the Street Fighter V finals, Capcom showed the first gameplay of the remaining two Season 3 DLC characters, G and Sagat, and confirmed they would be released the next day.

== Results ==
Street Fighter V: Arcade Edition
Place	Player	Alias	Character(s)
1st	(United Kingdom) Benjamin Simon	MOUZ|Problem X	M. Bison, Abigail
2nd	(Japan) Hajime Taniguchi	FOX|Tokido	Akuma
3rd	(Japan) Dohn Mamboyo	CYG|Dragunov	R. Mika
4th	(Japan) Tsunehiro Kanamori	Gachikun	Rashid
5th	(Japan) Atsushi Fujimura	FD|Fujimura	Ibuki
5th	(France) Olivier Hay	RB|Luffy	R. Mika
7th	(Dominican Republic) Christopher Rodriguez Nade	RISE|Caba	Guile
7th	(United States) Marcus Redmond	TheCoolKid93	Abigail

Dragon Ball FighterZ
Place	Player	Alias	Character(s)
1st	(United States) Dominique McLean	FOX|SonicFox	Bardock/Fused Zamasu/Android 16
2nd	(Japan) Goichi Kishida	CO|GO1	Cell/Bardock/Vegeta
3rd	(Japan) Shoji Sho	CO|Fenritti	Cell/Bardock/Vegeta
4th	(Japan) Naoki Nakayama	Ponos|Moke	Kid Buu/Cell/Trunks
5th	(United States) Perry Vinson	W2W|KnowKami	Android 21/Cell/Goku Black, Cell/Fused Zamasu/Kid Buu
5th	(Japan) Ryota Inoue	GGP|Kazunoko	Kid Buu/Adult Gohan/Yamcha
7th	(Japan) Tsutomu Kubota	Kubo	Adult Gohan/Android 16/Goku
7th	(United States) Steve Carbajal	NRG|Supernoon	Kid Buu/Cell/Vegeta

Tekken 7
Place	Player	Alias	Character(s)
1st	(South Korea) Sun-woong Youn	Fursan|LowHigh	Shaheen
2nd	(South Korea) Byeong-mun Son	UYU|Qudans	Devil Jin
3rd	(United States) Terrelle Jackson	ITS|Lil Majin	King
4th	(South Korea) Hyun-jim Kim	FOX|JDCR	Dragunov
5th	(Thailand) Nopparut Hempamorn	AR|Book	Jin
5th	(South Korea) Hyun-ho Jung	Fursan|Rangchu	Panda
7th	(Japan) Takumi Fujimura	AMD|Chirichiri	Shaheen
7th	(Japan) Takumi Hamasaki	COOAS|Noroma	Jack-7, Dragunov

Super Smash Bros. Melee
Place	Player	Alias	Character(s)
1st	(Sweden) William Hjelte	TSM|Leffen	Fox
2nd	(Sweden) Adam Lindgren	[A]|Armada	Fox, Peach
3rd	(United States) Justin McGrath	PG|Plup	Sheik
4th	(United States) Juan Debiedma	Liquid|Hungrybox	Jigglypuff
5th	(United States) Justin Hallett	Wizzrobe	Captain Falcon
5th	(United States) Joseph Marquez	C9|Mango	Falco
7th	(United States) James Liu	OG|Swedish Delight	Sheik
7th	(United States) Johnny Kim	Tempo|S2J	Captain Falcon

Guilty Gear Xrd REV 2
Place	Player	Alias	Character(s)
1st	(Japan) Omito Hashimoto	Omito	Johnny
2nd	(Japan) Masahiro Tominaga	Surugaya|Machabo	Ky
3rd	(United States) Eli Rabadad	LostSoul	Elphelt
4th	(Japan) unknown	Nage	Faust
5th	(Japan) Hisatoshi Usui	Rion	Ky
5th	(Japan) unknown	YOSHIMOTO|Zadi	Raven
7th	(Japan) Fukuda Norihiro	Mikado|Teresa	Jam
7th	(Japan) Harukuni Suga	Fumo	Elphelt

Super Smash Bros. for Wii U
Place	Player	Alias	Character(s)
1st	(United States) Bharat Chintapall	Lima	Bayonetta
2nd	(United States) Zack Lauth	CaptainZack	Bayonetta
3rd	(Japan) Yuta Uejima	DNG|Nietono	Sheik, Diddy Kong
4th	(Canada) Tamim Omary	EMG|Mistake	Bayonetta
5th	(United States) Eric Weber	W2W|Mr E	Lucina
5th	(United States) Jestise Negron	PG|MVD	Diddy Kong
7th	(Japan) Tetsuya Ishiguro	CND|Raito	Duck Hunt
7th	(Japan) Toshimasa Hayakawa	YOSHIMOTO|Choco	Zero Suit Samus

BlazBlue: Cross Tag Battle
Place	Player	Alias	Character(s)
1st	(Japan) unknown	Heiho	Ruby/Gordeau
2nd	(United States) Jeronte Latham	PAG|Fame96	Yu/Jin
3rd	(Japan) Ryuji Utsumi	BE|DoraBang	Hazama/Nu-13
4th	(Japan) Kazuyuki Koji	KojiKOG	Tager/Waldstein
5th	(Japan) Ryota Inoue	GGP|Kazunoko	Ruby/Gordeau
5th	(Japan) Shoji Sho	CO|Fenritti	Jin/Hyde
7th	(Japan) unknown	Gouda	Gordeau/Nu-13
7th	(Japan) Kohki Hayashi	DettyWhiteRock	Yang/Waldstein

Injustice 2
Place	Player	Alias	Character(s)
1st	(United States) Curtis McCall	Noble|Rewind	Catwoman, Black Adam, Blue Beetle, Firestorm
2nd	(United States) Tommy Tweedy	Noble|Tweedy	Starfire, Doctor Fate
3rd	(United States) Dominique McLean	FOX|SonicFox	Starfire, Firestorm, Red Hood, Black Manta
4th	(United States) Ryan DeDomenico	Big D	Poison Ivy
5th	(Canada) Alexandre Dubé-Bilodeau	PG|Hayatei	Robin
5th	(United States) Andrew Fontanez	Noble|Semiij	Catwoman
7th	(United States) Mo Amaechi	Method|SylverRye	Hellboy
7th	(Canada) Matthew Commandeur	BC|Biohazard	Bane, Cheetah, Starfire, Black Manta
