= Westballz =

American professional esports player

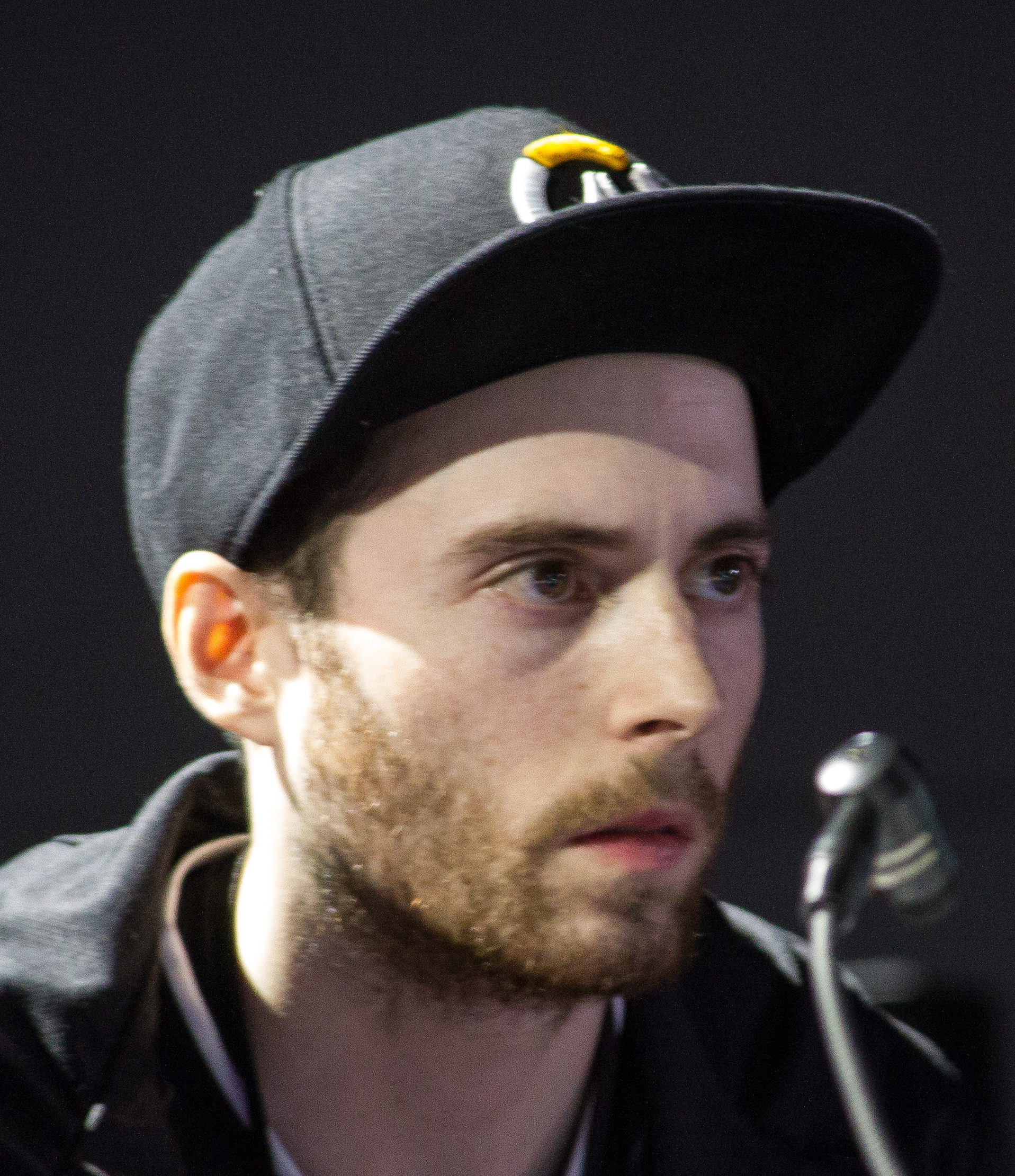
- Westballz in 2017

Personal information
- Name: Weston Dennis
- Nationality: American

Career information
- Game: Super Smash Bros. Melee

Team history
- 2015–2016: Tempo Storm
- 2016–2019: G2 Esports
- 2019-2020: Thunder Gaming

Weston Dennis, better known as Westballz, is an American professional Super Smash Bros. Melee player from Burbank, California. Widely considered one of the game's best and most technical Falco players, he has defeated several top professional players in tournament including Joseph "Mango" Marquez, Juan "Hungrybox" DeBiedma, Kevin "PPMD" Nanney and William "Leffen" Hjelte. A 2021 list compiled by PGstats ranked Dennis as the 26th-greatest Melee player of all time.

Dennis has previously been sponsored by Tempo Storm, G2 Esports and Thunder Gaming.

== Personal life ==
Dennis grew up in Burbank, California and attended John Burroughs High School.
