= Leffen =

Swedish professional gamer (born 1998)

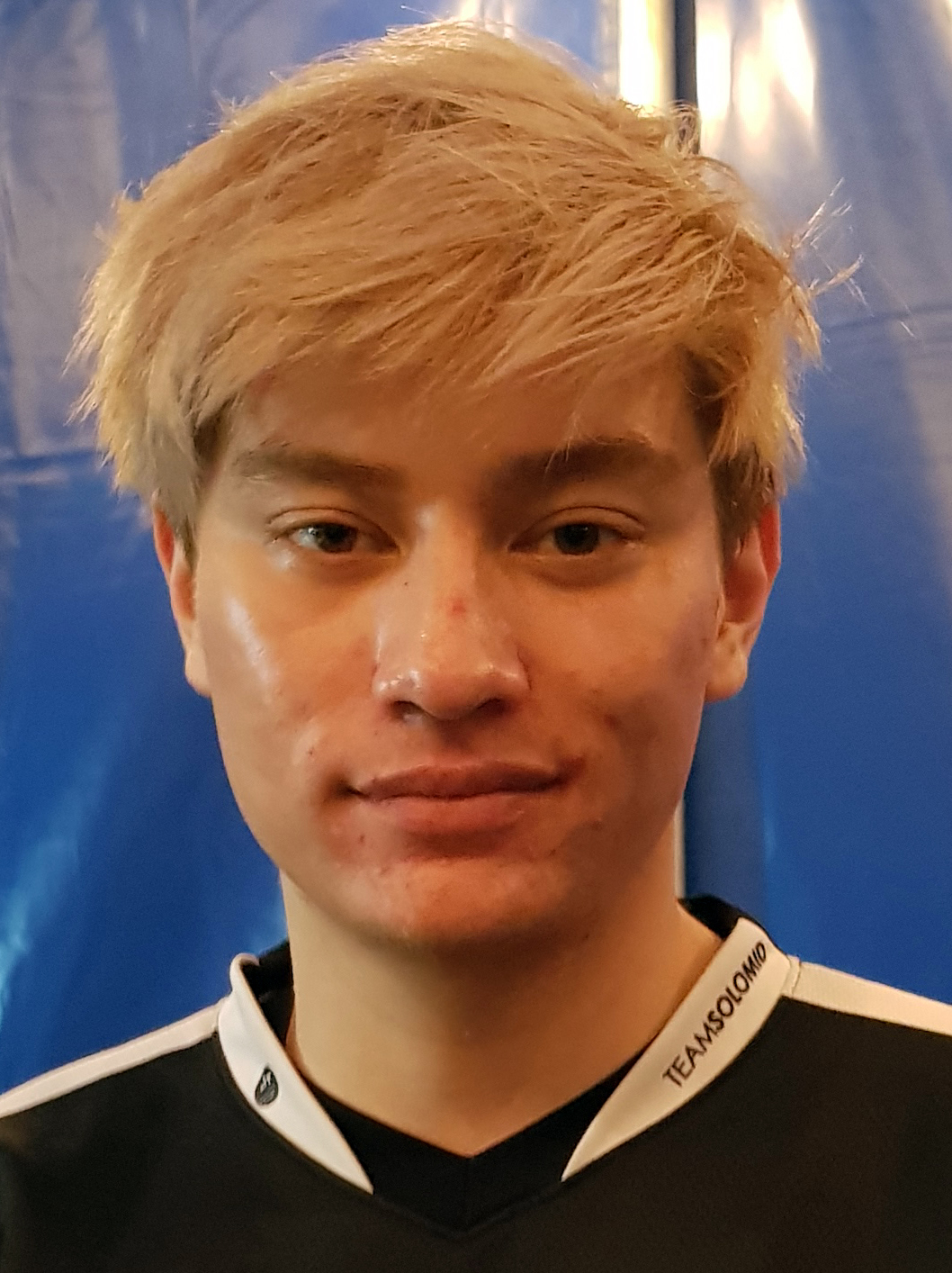
- Leffen at the tournament Heir 5 in Oadby in August 2018

Personal information
- Name: William Peter Hjelte
- Nickname: God Slayer
- Born: 16 October 1994 (age 32)
- Nationality: Swedish

Career information
- Games: Super Smash Bros. Melee; Super Smash Bros. Ultimate; Project M Guilty Gear Strive; Dragon Ball FighterZ
- Playing career: 2011–present

Team history
- 2015–present: Team SoloMid

Career highlights and awards
- Super Smash Bros. Melee (13 majors won): 2× Super Smash Con champion (2015, 2019); 2× Get On My Level champion (2016, 2017); B.E.A.S.T 5 champion (2015); Community Effort Orlando champion (2015); FC Smash 15XR: Return champion (2015); WTFox champion (2015); HTC Throwdown champion (2015); Don't Park on the Grass champion (2016); EVO champion (2018); Battle of BC 4 champion (2022); Ludwig Ahgren Championship Series 5 champion (2023); Super Smash Bros. Ultimate: DreamHack Winter champion (2019); Guilty Gear Strive: EVO champion (2023)

William Peter Hjelte (born 16 October 1994), better known by his gamertag Leffen, is a Swedish professional fighting game player and streamer. Although mostly known as a Super Smash Bros. Melee player, he has also competed in Dragon Ball FighterZ, Guilty Gear Strive, and Super Smash Bros. Ultimate. In Melee, Hjelte plays the character Fox, and is considered one of the best players in the world, having been ranked as one of the top seven Melee players in the world every year since 2014. A 2021 list compiled by PGstats ranked Hjelte as the sixth greatest Melee player of all time.

A Super Smash Bros. competitive player since 2009, he rose to international success in 2014, becoming the first player to beat each of the "Five Gods of Melee" —Armada, Mew2King, Hungrybox, Mang0, and PPMD— in tournaments over the course of his career (a feat only accomplished since by Plup), earning him the nickname of "God Slayer". He has won many tournaments ranked as majors in his career, starting with the Swedish tournament B.E.A.S.T 4 in 2014, which saw him become the first person other than one of the Five Gods to win a major since 2008. Since then, some of his most notable tournament wins include the 2015 and 2019 editions of Super Smash Con, CEO 2015, and Evo 2018. Since Armada's retirement in 2018, Leffen has been considered the undisputed best Melee player in Europe.

== Career ==
Hjelte started playing Super Smash Bros. in 2009, when he was introduced to Super Smash Bros. Melee. He initially started as a Yoshi and Falco player before switching to Fox. Leffen feels that he made the gradual switch from Falco to Fox because he views Falco as requiring more discipline and Fox being more suited to his play style.

He placed 9th in the Swedish national tournament B.E.A.S.T 2 within his first year of playing Melee. Throughout 2014 Leffen began placing highly in tournaments and defeating the top five Melee players regularly. Prior to EVO 2014, Joe Cribari of Nintendo Enthusiast listed Leffen among the three "underdogs" with the greatest chance to win the tournament. He finished 9th at EVO 2014.

In VGBootCamp's Apex 2015 Salty Suite, Hjelte defeated Kashan "Chillin" Khan in a first-to-five set without dropping a single game, and gained the "rights" to use Fox's default color. Mang0 subsequently challenged Hjelte to a US$1,000 money match if they were to face-off in the Apex Singles bracket. Hjelte would in turn beat Mango when they played in Winners' Semifinals. After defeating Mew2King at Apex 2015 in singles bracket, Hjelte has taken at least one set off each of the "five gods" of Melee. Hjelte ultimately finished third in Apex 2015 Melee singles.

On March 9, 2015, Hjelte was signed by Team SoloMid as its first player on their Super Smash Bros. division, as well as their first fighting game player. At CEO 2015 in Orlando, Florida, Leffen won his first American major, defeating Armada. He placed 5th at EVO 2015 later that year, despite being a favorite to win. He was upset by Panda Global's Plup who played Samus. Melee it on Me ranked Leffen as the 2nd best player in the world in their summer 2015 mid-season rankings. Leffen was barred from entering the United States just before The Big House 5 tournament because he was travelling on an Electronic System for Travel Authorization (ESTA) and employed by US-based Team SoloMid.

On February 16, 2016, Leffen became sponsored by Red Bull as an official Red Bull Athlete. As of 2018, he was no longer with Red Bull.

=== Visa issues and EVO 2018 ===
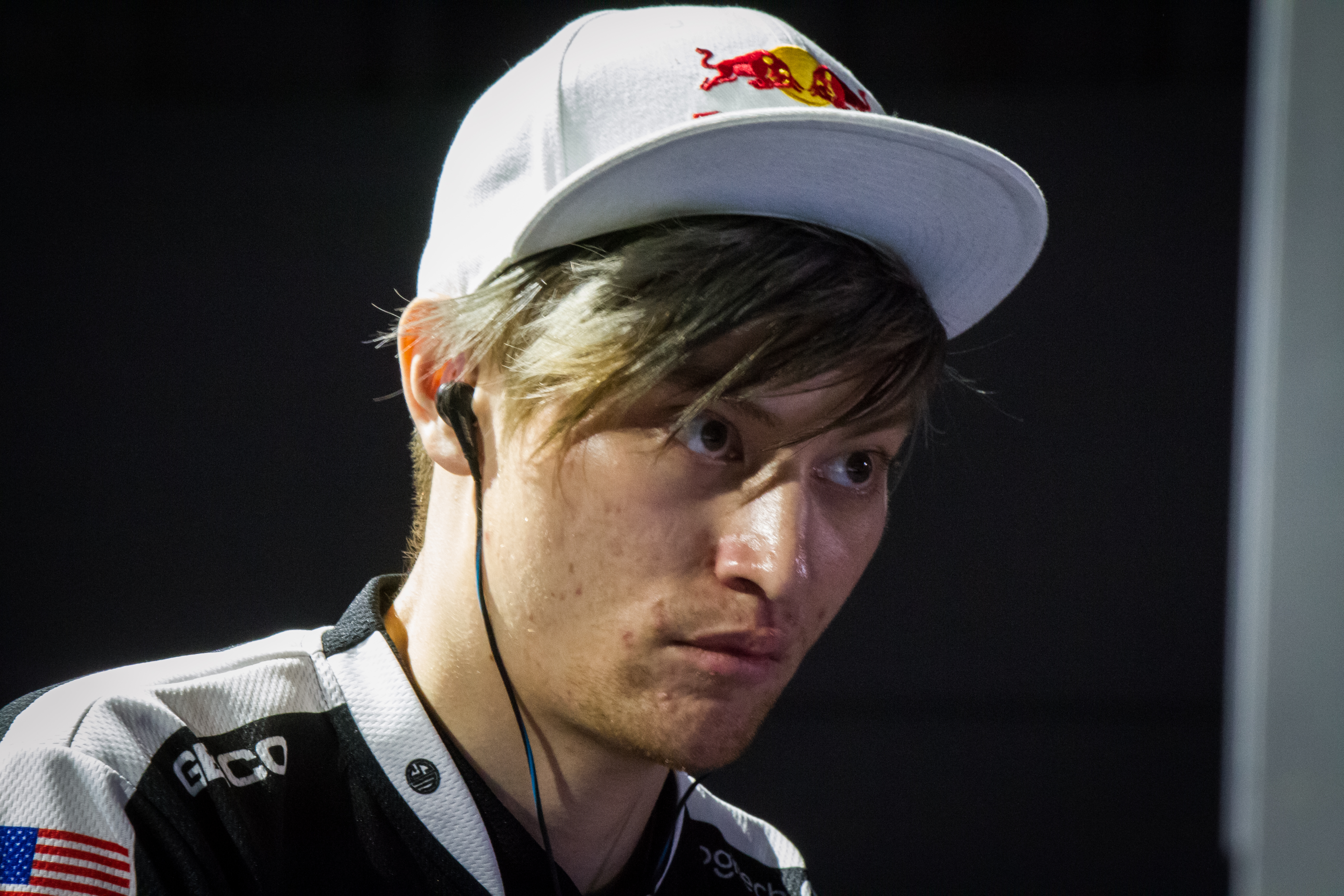
Leffen in 2017

On April 29, 2016, Leffen announced that his Form I-129 petition to obtain a visa had been denied by United States Citizenship and Immigration Services. On 4 May 2016 it was initially announced that Team SoloMid was able to secure a P1 Visa for Leffen so he can be able to attend US-based tournaments throughout July which includes EVO 2016 and that TSM was working on extending this visa for the long term. However, on July 14 Leffen announced that he had run into additional delays in the visa approval process and would miss EVO. Finally, on October 3, Leffen's visa was approved, allowing him to compete in US-based tournaments again, in time for The Big House 6. In August 2018, Leffen won Evo 2018, defeating Armada 3–0 in grand finals to claim the trophy.

=== Other games ===
Hjelte has competed in fighting games including Dragon Ball FighterZ, Ultra Street Fighter IV, Ultimate Marvel vs. Capcom 3, and The King of Fighters XIII. According to the PGRZ, Hjelte is considered the 28th best Dragon Ball FighterZ player of all time. In an interview with EventHubs prior to Apex 2015, he suggested he might play Guilty Gear Xrd on his Twitch stream after Apex 2015 concluded. As of the release of Guilty Gear Strive, Hjelte has been hosting online tournaments for the game, hosting the title's first major, the Big LEVO. At Evo 2022, Leffen placed 3rd out of 2,161 entrants in Guilty Gear Strive, making this the first time that a player has made Top 8 at EVO in both a Smash title as well as a traditional fighting game. The following year, Leffen would take 1st out of 2,474 entrants in the same game at Evo 2023, becoming the first person to hold victories in both Smash and a traditional fighting game in EVO.

== Personal life ==
Hjelte is Korean-Swedish; his mother is a native Swede, while his father is a South Korean adoptee. Hjelte says his family does not regularly follow Korean cultural traditions.

== Awards and nominations ==
Ceremony	Year	Category	Result	Ref.
The Streamer Awards	2021	Best Super Smash Bros. Streamer	Nominated	
