= Supernova (tournament) =

Annual Super Smash Bros. convention

- Super Smash Con logo

Tournament information
- Game: Super Smash Bros.
- Location: Chantilly, Virginia
- Established: 2015
- Number of tournaments: 7: 64; Melee; Brawl; Wii U; Ultimate; Rivals of Aether; Rivals 2
- Format: Double-elimination
- Website: supernova.gg

Current champion
- Singles; Smash 64: Kurabba; Melee: Zain; Brawl: Player-1; Wii U: falln; Ultimate: Miya

Supernova (formerly known as Super Smash Con) is an annual Super Smash Bros. convention and tournament series, previously held at the Dulles Expo Center in Chantilly, Virginia, and at Baltimore Convention Center since 2026. The event is held in early August and focuses on the video game series published by Nintendo along with other video games, and features tournaments for every entry in the series. Side events have featured other platform fighters, including Rivals of Aether, Slap City, and Nickelodeon All-Star Brawl.

== History ==
Super Smash Con was established in 2015 by Justin Wykowski.

It is notable among Super Smash Bros. majors as one of the only tournaments to include brackets for every game in the series released to date. It is considered not just a tournament but also a convention celebrating the series, hosting a wide array of vendors, contests, events, and live music. Of particular note is the Combo Contest, in which entrants attempt to complete elaborate and flashy combos in the original Super Smash Bros before a panel of judges, sometimes with multiple controllers or self-imposed handicaps such as playing with ones feet. The Smashies, an annual awards ceremony, also takes place during Supernova. Hosted by longtime competitor and commentator Coney, it awards achievements within the Smash Bros. community during the past year. In 2025, Supernova became the largest Super Smash Bros. Melee tournament ever by number of entrants.

Supernova has expanded to run brackets for new and popular platform fighters in recent years. In 2021, a Nickelodeon All-Star Brawl tournament was hosted. It has also held brackets for Rivals of Aether II since its 2024 release, featured as part of its Championship Series of tournaments.

Due to the COVID-19 pandemic, Super Smash Con 2020 was cancelled, returning in late 2021 with Super Smash Con Fall Fest.

In 2023, Nintendo updated their guidelines regarding community tournaments, forbidding them from using their IP in any tournament names, even in a modified state. The following year, the event was rebranded to Supernova, the name chosen in part due to its location in northern Virginia, a prominent Smash Bros competitive region.

In 2026, after the closure of Dulles Expo Center, the venue was moved to Baltimore Convention Center.
