= Hungrybox =

Argentine-American professional esports player

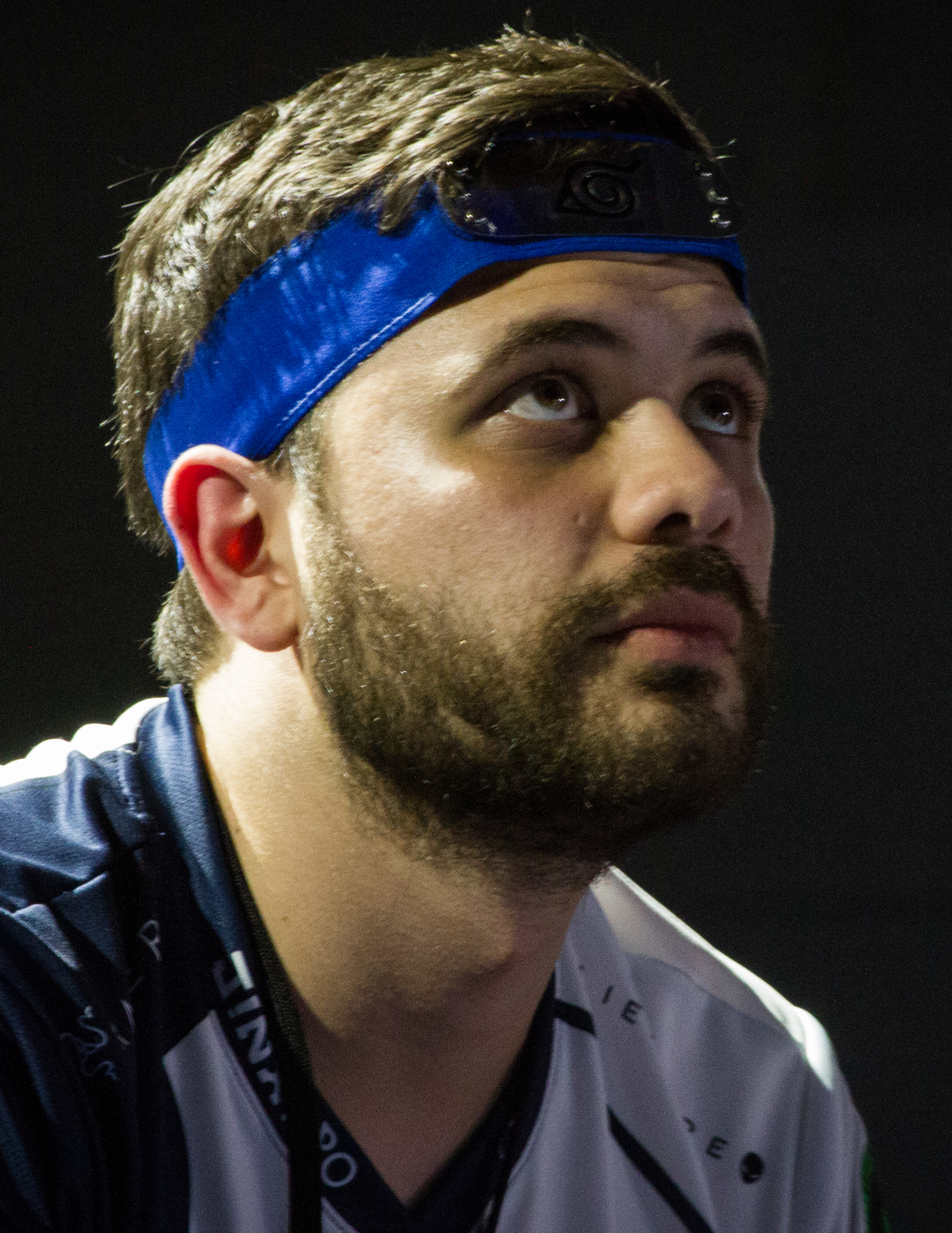
- Hungrybox at Get On My Level 2017

Personal information
- Name: Juan DeBiedma
- Nickname(s): Hbox; Clutchbox; Hgod; Clutchgod
- Born: June 21, 1993 (age 33); Argentina
- Nationality: Argentinian and American

Current team
- Team: Team Liquid
- Game: Super Smash Bros. Melee Super Smash Bros. Ultimate

Career information
- Games: Project M; Super Smash Bros. Brawl; Super Smash Bros. for Wii U; Super Smash Bros. Melee; Super Smash Bros. Ultimate
- Playing career: 2007–present

Team history
- 2013–2014: CLASH Tournaments
- 2014–2015: Team Curse
- 2015–present: Team Liquid

Career highlights and awards
- 8× CEO champion (2010, 2011, 2016–2019, 2025-2026); 5× DreamHack champion (2015, 2017, 2017, 2018, 2019); 3× Get On My Level champion (2015, 2018, 2022); 3× Smash Summit champion (2017, 2018, 2020); 3× EGLX champion (2016, 2018, 2019); 2× Smash 'N' Splash champion (2016, 2017); 2× Pound champion (2016, 2019); 2× Shine champion (2017, 2019); 2× The Big House champion (2017, 2018); 2x Full Bloom champion (2017, 2018); 2× GameTyrant Expo champion (2017, 2018); 2x Low Tier City champion (2018, 2019); 2x Genesis champion (2019, 2025); 2x Riptide champion (2022, 2026); Revival of Melee 2 champion (2009); Apex champion (2010); MLG champion (2015); Paragon Orlando champion (2015); Battle of the Five Gods champion (2016); EVO champion (2016); Smash Rivalries champion (2017); Mainstage champion (2019); Wavedash champion (2022); Luminosity Makes Moves Miami champion (2025)

Twitch information
- Channel: Hungrybox
- Followers: 505,000
- Last updated: April 23, 2026

Juan Manuel DeBiedma (/dəˌbiːˈɛdmə/; born June 21, 1993), better known by his alias Hungrybox, is an Argentine–American professional Super Smash Bros. player, streamer, tournament organizer and commentator. Recognized as one of the greatest and most successful Super Smash Bros. Melee players of all time, he is considered one of the historical "Five Gods of Melee" along with Adam "Armada" Lindgren, Jason "Mew2King" Zimmerman, Joseph "Mang0" Marquez, and Kevin "PPMD" Nanney, and is regarded as the greatest Jigglypuff player in history. He is also an active competitor in Super Smash Bros. Ultimate, and has been a member of Team Liquid since 2015, becoming its co-owner in December 2021. He is currently ranked as the 3rd best Melee player in the world for 2025.

DeBiedma has won over forty major Melee Singles tournaments between 2009 and 2025, including editions of Apex, The Big House, CEO, DreamHack, EVO, GENESIS, the MLG National Championship, and Smash Summit. He has been ranked one of the top ten Melee players in the world every year since formal rankings began in 2013, achieving the top rank a record three consecutive times from 2017 to 2019; retroactive rankings establish him as a top ten player in the world every year since 2009, and rank him number one for 2010. A 2021 list compiled by PGstats ranked DeBiedma as the third-greatest Melee player of all time after Mang0 and Armada. Despite his "God" status, he is considered one of the most polarizing figures in the Melee community, in part due to the unpopularity of his defensive, counterattack-centric playstyle among part of the community.

Born in Argentina, DeBiedma grew up in Orlando, Florida, and became a U.S. citizen in 2017. DeBiedma has also competed in Super Smash Bros. games subsequent to Melee, and won both Project M and Ultimate tournaments. Although primarily known as a Singles player, he also has an extensive career in Melee Doubles, and partnered up with a variety of other players, most notably Mew2King and Justin "Plup" McGrath, both of whom he won major Doubles tournaments with; he has been managed by his lifelong best friend Luis "Crunch" Rosias for the entirety of his career. He also regularly acts as commentator, and is the creator of the mostly-online The Box series of Super Smash Bros. tournaments created in 2020, which include Coinbox, the largest online Ultimate tournament series.

== Early life ==
Juan Manuel DeBiedma was born in Argentina on June 21, 1993, to Juan Daniel Debiedma, a diplomat for Argentina, and Lucia Violante, a flight attendant. He has two older brothers, Gaston, the oldest, and Fermin. In the mid-1990s, DeBiedma's family moved to Orlando, Florida, after which Violante became a real estate agent.

DeBiedma played piano and sang a capella while growing up. He discovered video games at a young age, particularly enjoying the Super Mario Advance series, and started playing Melee when he was little after the stepson of one of his father's co-workers introduced him to the game. He would also often play Super Smash Bros. Brawl with Fermin. DeBiedma and his lifelong best friend and future manager, Luis "Crunch" Rosias, met in fifth grade in Orlando, and they would often play Melee together. He originally used Ness as his main character, but switched to Jigglypuff after realizing the effectiveness of the "Rest" move.

His eventual nickname, "Hungrybox", came from middle school after he failed to forge his mother's signature, producing a drawing instead. He kept on recreating the drawing when bored in class, eventually resulting in a "hungry box" character resembling a box with eyes and a jagged mouth.

DeBiedma was abandoned by his father Juan Daniel when he was 15 years old; they last saw each other July 20, 2008, when Juan Daniel dropped him off at the venue for the Brawl tournament Fast 1 before flying back to Argentina.

== Esports career ==
=== Early career (2007–2013) ===
DeBiedma discovered the Super Smash Bros. competitive scene sometime between 2006–2007 and started to perform at small local tournaments in 2007. In July 2008, he volunteered to host several players at his parents' home for the upcoming 122-player Brawl tournament named Fast 1. He himself took part of the tournament, finishing in 25th place.

In 2009 at a local Tampa tournament, Twilight Showdown 6, he placed 3rd for the first time in any tournament, earning $27.50, his first prize money; he recognizes this as the first moment he considered becoming professional. After finishing in 7th place at Revival of Melee on March 7, DeBiedma placed 3rd at GENESIS for Melee on July 11, his first high placement at a major Melee tournament, while placing 97th on Brawl the following day. DeBiedma won his first-ever tournament at Revival of Melee 2 on November 21, 2009. He then went on to place in high positions repeatedly on tournaments, with Apex 2010 on August 8 marking his first win in a major tournament.

For the following years, DeBiedma remained one of the top Melee players, and established himself as the best Jigglypuff player in the world. Results in major tournaments included placing 2nd at both Apex 2012 and The Big House 3 in 2013. He won both the Singles and Doubles tournaments at CEO 2010 (with ChuDat in Doubles), and then again at CEO 2011 (with Linguini in Doubles). In parallel, he continued to compete on Brawl, to lesser success, and on the Brawl mod Project M, winning several minor tournaments.

=== Early "Five Gods" Era (2013–2017) ===
In 2013, Evo, the most prominent fighting game event worldwide, announced Melee as part of the Evo 2013 line-up, after the game had only previously been featured at Evo 2007. The event is considered the full beginning of the "Era of the Five Gods" (or "Platinum" Era), which marked a surge in prominence and popularity for the Melee competitive scene, and its near-total domination by five players: DeBiedma, Adam "Armada" Lindgren, Jason "Mew2King" Zimmerman, Joseph "Mango" Marquez, and Kevin "PPMD" Nanney, with every Melee tournament ranked Supermajor (the highest rating for a Smash tournament) or Major (the second-highest) for several consecutive years being won by one of the "Gods", and them rarely losing to anyone but another "God". At Evo 2013, DeBiedma finished in 3rd place, losing to Wobblez in the losers finals after a controversial finish; in parallel, he took part in a Melee Doubles Evo side-event, teaming up with Mew2King to win the tournament.

On July 3, 2013, DeBiedma was picked up by team CLASH Tournaments alongside fellow Super Smash Bros. player Aziz "Hax" Al-Yami. On April 17 of the following year, he left CLASH Tournaments and joined Team Curse. On January 6, 2015, Team Curse merged with Team Liquid, leading DeBiedma to be picked up by Team Liquid along with his teammate Kashan "Chillin" Khan, joining other Smash Bros. players Ken Hoang and Daniel "KoreanDJ" Jung.

In 2014, DeBiedma placed top three in nine Melee tournaments, including a victory at Fight Pitt V. At Evo 2014, he reached the Grand Finals for the first time, losing to Mango and finishing in 2nd place; he once again won the Doubles side-event, this time teaming up with Justin "Plup" McGrath.

In 2015, DeBiedma won the Melee Singles tournament at Paragon, defeating Mew2King in the Grand Finals. At Evo 2015 in July, he finished in 2nd place, losing to Armada in the Grand Finals; the following month, he announced that he would be becoming less active in competitive Smash, as he began his career as an engineer. At Paragon Los Angeles, his next tournament after Evo, he finished 3rd in Melee after being eliminated by Mew2King with a score of 2–3. In parallel to his Melee career, he competed on the newly released Super Smash Bros. for Nintendo 3DS and Super Smash Bros. for Wii U to little success; at Paragon Los Angeles in 2015, the largest Project M tournament in history, DeBiedma finished 4th after being defeated by Mew2King 3–1.

DreamHack Winter 2015 from November 26 to November 29, 2015, marked DeBiedma's first time winning both the Singles and Doubles tournaments at a Super Major event, winning Singles by defeating Armada 3–1 in the second set of Grand Finals after losing 3–0 in the first set, and Doubles by teaming up with Axe to defeat DaJuan "Shroomed" McDaniel and McCain "MacD" LaVelle 3–1 in the grand finals. His win in the Singles tournament earned him $10,000, his first five-figure payout; he broke into tears during his post-match interview. In early 2016, DeBiedma won two additional singles Super Major tournaments, Pound and CEO 2016.

On July 17, 2016, DeBiedma participated in the Evo 2016 Melee tournament and reached the Grand Finals for the third consecutive year, against Armada for a second consecutive time. In the Grand Finals, DeBiedma won two consecutive best-of-five sets, both with a score of 3–2, to win Evo for the first time in his career.

The following October, DeBiedma competed at The Big House 6, where he placed 5th, losing to Armada in the losers quarter-finals; although he had been juggling his entire e-sports career with full studies and/or working, DeBiedma, disappointed by his performance, decided to quit his job as process engineer for WestRock to become a full-time professional player for the first time.

=== Domination of Melee (2017–2020) ===
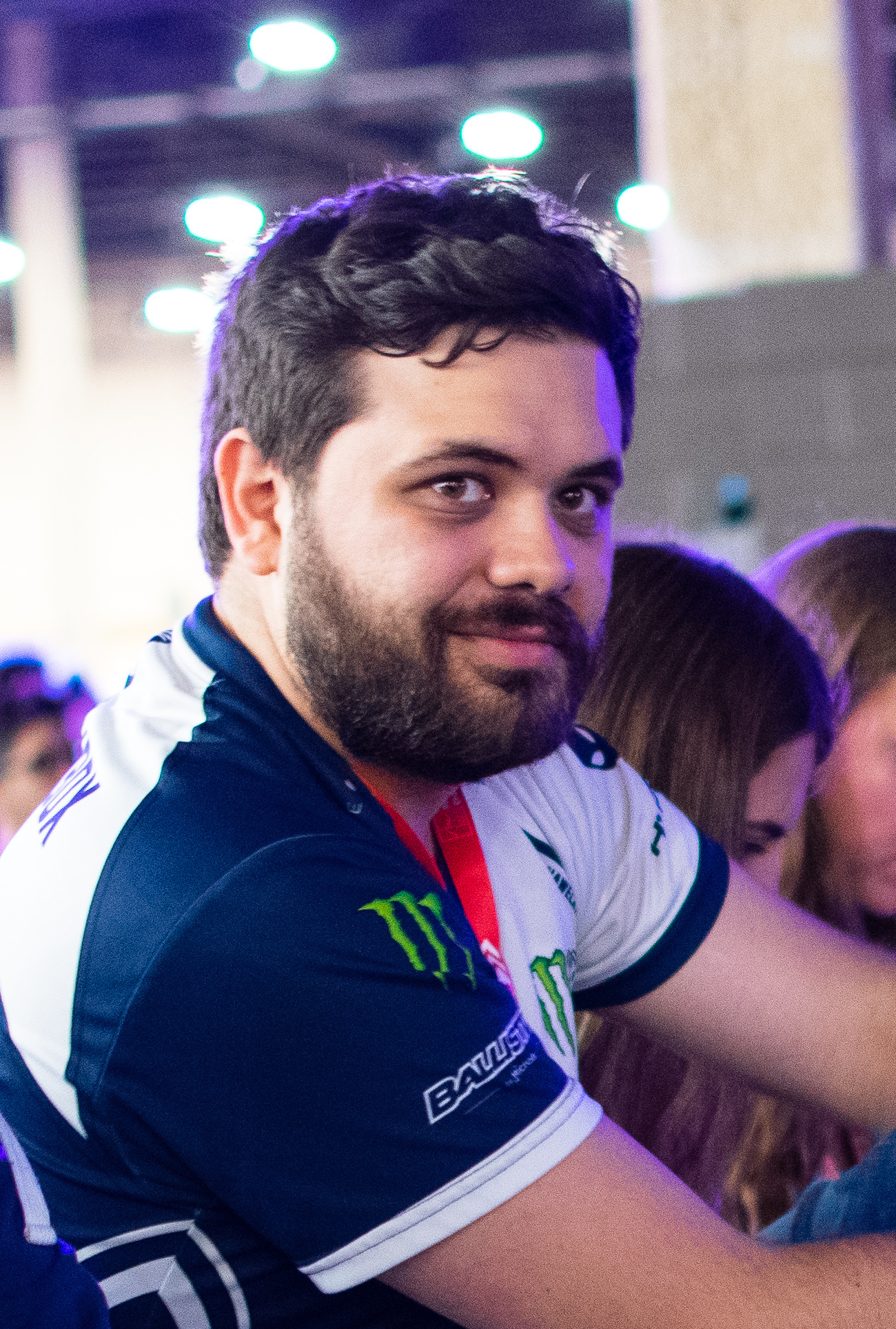
DeBiedma at Evo 2018

In 2017, DeBiedma won multiple tournaments, including the Supermajor tournament The Big House 7, and four Super Major tournaments: Shine 2017, DreamHack Austin 2017, DreamHack Denver 2017, and Smash Summit 5; for the latter, he set a new record for most money won in a single Melee tournament, receiving $29,315.30 as prize money.

In 2018, DeBiedma continued to consistently rank high on tournaments, winning a total of 18, including three Supermajors: Shine 2017, CEO 2018, and The Big House 8. At Evo 2018, DeBiedma lost to Armada in the losers semifinals and ranked 4th. DeBiedma would go on to score five consecutive tournaments wins at the end of the year, including the Singles tournament at Smash Summit 7 on November 15.

In February 2019, DeBiedma won GENESIS 6, his first GENESIS win after participating in all five previous editions of the Singles Melee tournament. He went on to win more Majors, including Pound 2019, Low Tier City 7, CEO 2019, Shine 2019, and Mainstage.

Following the release of Super Smash Bros. Ultimate in December 2018, DeBiedma started entering Ultimate tournaments as part of events in which he was also competing as a Melee player; his Ultimate endeavors were less successful. In his first Ultimate tournament, the 385-entrant Ultimatum on December 29, he finished in 65th place. At GENESIS 6, the biggest Ultimate tournament at that point with 2105 entrants, DeBiedma placed 193rd in Singles, and 257th in Doubles with Kashan "Chillindude" Khan. His best Ultimate ranking for 2019 was at Mango's Birthday Bash, where he finished in 7th place; in addition, he performed as a Melee player, finishing 2nd in both singles and Doubles tournaments (teaming up with Zain for the latter).

=== COVID-19 and Ultimate (2020–2021) ===
DeBiedma won GatorLAN Spring 2020, before finishing 2nd at GENESIS 7 after losing to Zain in the Singles Grand Finals, while teaming up with him to rank 5th in Doubles. He went on to win Smash Summit 9 in February. At CEO Dreamland, he won both the Singles tournament, and the Doubles tournament with Kilmer "mayb" Varela.

He won his first Ultimate tournament by finishing 1st in The Salad Online 13's Ultimate Singles bracket.

Starting in March 2020 the COVID-19 pandemic caused the Smash community to either cancel events or move them online. Due to Melee not having an online mode, the Melee community became de facto inactive, apart from tournaments using a fan-made online mod of Melee. DeBiedma failed to win any for the rest of the year. He achieved his worst Melee placement in 13 years in July at LACS 2, finishing 13th. The following November at Perfect Series 3: ONLINE on November 3, he finished in 17th place.

=== Return to in-person competition and organizer (2021–present) ===
From July 15 to July 18, 2021, DeBiedma took part in the Melee Major tournament Smash Summit 11, the first offline Super Smash Bros. Major in North America since Frostbite in February 2020. At the end of the three-day singles tournament, he took third place, losing to Zain in the winner's finals and then to eventual tournament winner Mang0 in the loser's finals. He and Plup also took 2nd place in a special single-elimination doubles tournament where players could only pick each character once per set, losing to Mang0 and SFAT in the finals. Mang0's first-place prize in the singles tournament of $46,700 surpassed the all-time record of $29,315 DeBiedma had earned for winning Smash Summit 5 in 2017.

At Riptide on September 10–12, 2021, DeBiedma took third place in the singles tournament after losing to iBDW in Winners Finals and to Plup in losers finals. He and Plup also won the doubles tournament. DeBiedma and four of his fellow Team Liquid members became co-owners of the team in December.

On July 3, 2022, DeBiedma won Get On My Level 2022 in Canada, marking his first Singles major won in two and a half years since his last major win at Smash Summit 9 in February 2020; he would later score his second major win of that year at Riptide in September in the United States. He would ultimately be ranked 5th in the world for Melee in 2022 (the first official yearly rankings since 2019's due to COVID-2019), officially losing his rank as top player in the world and receiving his lowest Melee ranking since 2014. OrionRank (a group with rankings larger than UltRank, the main ranking entity for Ultimate, which is limited to 100 players) also ranked him the 199th Ultimate player in North America for 2022.

On February 16, 2025, DeBiedma won the eleventh installment of annual tournament GENESIS, which is seen as "one of the most prestigious international tournaments in the fighting game scene." This was his first time winning a major since Riptide 2022.

== Style and public image ==
=== Playstyle ===
Largely credited with elevating the Melee community's perception of Jigglypuff's viability in competition and setting the standard of how to play the character, DeBiedma relies heavily on a defensive, counterattack-centric playstyle revolving around avoiding his opponent until he finds an opportunity to attack and capitalize on their mistakes; it is considered a "high-risk high-reward" playstyle, as DeBiedma's usual goal is to eventually hit his opponent with "Rest", a move unique to Jigglypuff which inflicts abnormally high knockback on opponents and is able to take the opponent's stock at much lower damage percentages than other moves of its responsiveness. The move has a very small range, making it hard to land without setting up a combo that finishes with it and, regardless of whether it successfully hits or not, it leaves Jigglypuff asleep and completely vulnerable to enemy attack for three seconds afterwards; as such, failure to hit the opponent via "Rest" can result in drawbacks such as massive damage inflicted on Jigglypuff via combos or, if damage is already high, in an instant kill, since Jigglypuff is the second lightest character in the game and is prone to losing stocks quickly as a result. Even if the move is successful and takes a stock, Jigglypuff might not wake up fast enough to avoid getting attacked and potentially killed in return upon her foe respawning, leaving DeBiedma little room for mistakes during a game.

DeBiedma claimed in 2013 that he "got good using gimmicks" and that his hands were not fast enough for technical skill. Liking Melee for its "unorthodox value", he claimed in 2014 that he disliked traditional head-to-head fighting games. In 2014, he stated: "In my playstyle, I'm a greedy novel editor — I'll catch every last mistake or typo you make, and punish you harshly for it."

DeBiedma has earned the nickname "Clutchbox" due to his frequent clutch performances, pulling off comebacks when in difficult positions, particularly when in the middle of losing sets or after being sent to a losers bracket.

=== Public perception ===
DeBiedma is unanimously seen as one of the best players in Melee history, as well as the best Jigglypuff player in the game's history. However, he has remained a polarizing figure for Melee fans and players all throughout his career, with part of the community criticizing his playstyle as annoying and too slow and Jigglypuff as an unpleasing character to watch; he has also been accused of hurting the community, with some alleging that his playstyle was driving viewers away. ESPN stated in 2016: "There is no question that Juan 'Hungrybox' Debiedma is the most polarizing figure in the realm of Super Smash Bros. Melee. Ten years deep as a competitor, he's seen fans discount him, his performances, and his character selection, some even believing that he's killing the game with each set." In another article in 2019, they stated that he "has been the recipient of a significant amount of hate throughout his career."

DeBiedma also attracted criticism for his tendency to loudly and flashily celebrate his wins (called "pop-offs" within the community), which some considered disrespectful to his defeated opponents. According to DeBiedma, the Melee community's partial rejection of his playstyle started very early in his career, claiming that "people didn't like that at all" when he started placing high in local tournaments in 2008.

He has admitted to suffering from the way part of the community treats him, also stating that the community's perception of him was a factor in him starting to drink excessively in 2017 and resuming having a day job despite being the No. 1 Melee player in the world.

In the Grand Finals of DreamHack Austin 2017 in which he faced Daniel "ChuDat" Rodriguez in several highly contested games described by ESPN as "high-level spectacle", DeBiedma won the final game, and therefore the tournament, by camping and avoiding contact with ChuDat's Ice Climbers until the clock ran out, giving DeBiedma the win due to his statistical advantage in stocks and damage ratio. Bleeding Cool reported the event with the headline "DreamHack Austin Champion Wins In The Most Pathetic Way Possible". In April 2018, DeBiedma claimed on Twitter that a stranger attracted his attention while he was shopping at Walmart earlier during the day, before saying "Fuck you and your family Hungrybox", as well as "some other stuff about [him]".

=== Controversial tournament events ===
DeBiedma's match against Zac "SFAT" Cordoni in the losers semifinals at Evo 2017 attracted controversy after DeBiedma called his coach, Luis "Crunch" Rosias, over for advice in between games, which was as a violation of the event's "No Coaching After Pools" rule; as the discussion between DeBiedma and Crunch was ongoing, Gordon "G$" Connell, a friend of SFAT, approached and mocked the other two by mimicking a coach-like discussion with SFAT. As the result, Evo considered that both players had violated the rule, and let the match's original result, a win for DeBiedma, stand; both players nevertheless received a yellow card as punishment for their actions. This upset part of the fans, who believed that, as SFAT was not actually being coached, he should have won by disqualification. Others pointed out that, according to the official Evo ruleset, if such an incident is not reported at the time it took place, then it is ignored, and that, as neither DeBiedma nor SFAT reported the other, neither should have been carded in the first place. DeBiedma eventually lost the following round, the losers finals, against Mango, finishing 3rd in the tournament while SFAT placed 4th as the result of his loss.

One of the most infamous moments in Melee history took place in April 2019 at Pound 2019 hosted in Maryland, when, after DeBiedma won the Melee Singles tournament by defeating Mango in the Grand Finals, a member in the crowd, presumably upset by his win, threw a dead crab at DeBiedma, barely missing him. After a moment of incredulousness, an infuriated DeBiedma took the crab and angrily addressed the crowd, demanding to know who threw it, questioning if they knew how hard he worked for his results before throwing it at the ground as the crowd attempted to console him. The individual in question was later identified and ejected from the building, with a Pound official announcing that they had been permanently banned from future Pound events and that their name would be privately disclosed to other Smash tournament organizers. DeBiedma then apologized on Twitter for losing his temper, later stating: "I was just so disappointed. I looked down and I'm like 'who threw this? Why would you throw this at me?'", later making fun of the incident by eating a crab during a live stream. DeBiedma would later state during a 2025 livestream that he was intent on retiring during the plane ride home, but decided not to after seeing the outpour of support towards him on Twitter. The crab incident became viral and was relayed by a variety of media outlets, quickly becoming a meme within the Smash community.

== Personal life ==
After abandoning his family and returning to Argentina in 2008, DeBiedma's father Juan Daniel died from a heart attack in late 2015. This was shortly before DeBiedma won both the Singles and Doubles Melee tournaments at DreamHack Winter 2015, earning his first five-figure payout and marking his first time winning both Singles and Doubles at a Super Major tournament; in a post-win interview, he broke into tears and opened about his father's lack of support. Conversely, DeBiedma credits his mother Lucia Violante for being consistently supportive since the beginning.

DeBiedma's lifelong best friend and manager is Luis "Crunch" Rosias. DeBiedma credits Rosias with training him and helping him develop his skills at Melee, most notably in how to win against Fox, who is often considered the best character in the game and has a favorable matchup against DeBiedma's character, Jigglypuff.

While competing professionally in Melee, DeBiedma continued to be a full-time student, graduating Freedom High School in 2011, and the University of Florida with a bachelor's degree in chemical engineering in 2015; after getting his degree, he relocated from Jacksonville, Florida to Buford, Georgia, and then again to Demopolis, Alabama, in order to find work that could still allow him to continue his full-time Super Smash Bros. career. In 2015, he began working as a process engineer for WestRock, but quit his job the following year after underperforming at The Big House 6, in order to pursue a full-time eSports career. In March 2018, however, the decline of his mental health in 2017 following a break-up led him to take a regular job once again at ServiceNow in Florida; his feeling that the Melee community's perception of him was deteriorating also weighed heavily on him and was a factor in this decision. In June 2019, after winning CEO for the fourth time, he announced that he would be leaving the workforce to pursue eSports full-time once again.

On August 15, 2017, DeBiedma became a U.S. citizen.

== Awards and nominations ==
Ceremony	Year	Category	Result	Ref.
The Game Awards	2016	Esports Player of the Year	Nominated	
The Esports Awards	2022	Esports Content Creator of the Year	Won	
The Streamer Awards	2021	Best Super Smash Bros. Streamer	Nominated	
The Streamer Awards	2023	Best Fighting Games Streamer	Nominated	

== Media ==
DeBiedma's early Melee career was documented in an episode of the 2013 documentary series The Smash Brothers. He also is present in another documentary about the competitive Smash scene called Metagame. DeBiedma has been a vocal advocate for the competitive Super Smash Bros. scene, praising the technological advancements created for Melee, and criticizing Nintendo for their lack of support towards the community. On January 26, 2020, YouTuber EmpLemon uploaded a video entitled "there will Never Ever be another Melee player like HungryBox" detailing key moments in DeBiedma's career and his impact on the Melee community. The video has since garnered over 10 million views, the most popular on EmpLemon's channel.
