= Super Smash Bros. in esports =

Super Smash Bros.
- Highest governing body: None
- First played: 2002

Characteristics
- Type: Video game, esports
- Equipment: GameCube, Wii, Nintendo 64, Wii U, Nintendo Switch

Professional Super Smash Bros. competition involves professional gamers competing in the Super Smash Bros. series of crossover fighting games published by Nintendo. Organized tournament competition began in 2002 with Super Smash Bros. Melee, released for the GameCube in 2001; however, in the series' native Japan, there have been tournaments as early as 1999 with the original Super Smash Bros. for the Nintendo 64. Later tournaments have featured the other games in the series, with the two largest and most popular Smash Bros. scenes revolving around Melee and Super Smash Bros. Ultimate for the Nintendo Switch. Smaller scenes exist for the original game and Project M, a popular fan modification of Super Smash Bros. Brawl for the Wii, and to a lesser extent, Brawl itself. Major Smash Bros. tournaments include the GENESIS, Evolution Championship Series (EVO), Super Smash Con and The Big House annual series. Major League Gaming (MLG) has also previously included Smash Bros. games in its Pro Circuit.

The competitive Smash Bros. community is well known in the wider fighting game community for its decentralized, grassroots scene. No official governing body or tournament circuit exists for professional Smash Bros., a byproduct of Nintendo's historical reluctance to directly promote the scene.

== History of competitive Super Smash Bros. Melee ==
=== Early years: 2002–2007 ===
The first publicized western Super Smash Bros. Melee tournaments were held in early 2002, centering around the Tournament Go series hosted in California by Matt "MattDeezie" Dahlgren. Due to the lack of an agreed upon standardized ruleset, tournaments in this period often featured wildly different rules, with frequent disputes among competitors regarding the legality of items and the legal stagelist. A standardized ruleset was eventually developed over several years which banned all items and narrowed the list of stages to a select few. On March 1, 2003, the International Video Game Federation hosted the first corporate sponsored Super Smash Bros. tournament, the IVGF Northwest Regionals, won by Jeremy "Recipherus" Fremlin.

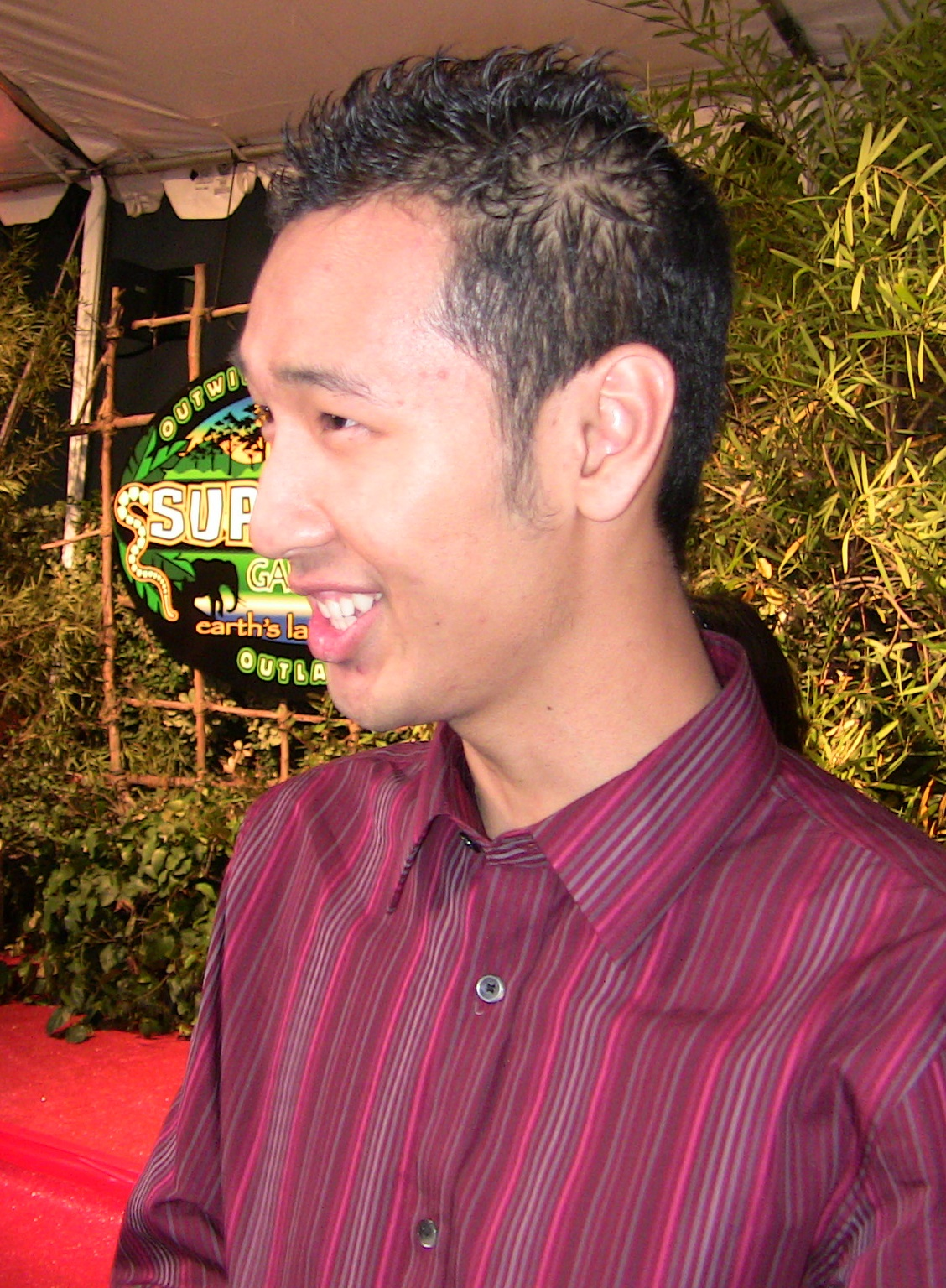
Ken Hoang was widely considered the best Super Smash Bros. Melee player in the world during the early years of the game's competitive scene.

The period of 2003 to 2007 is often referred to as the "Golden Age" of Melee; the game was featured in the Major League Gaming (MLG) Pro Circuit during this period from 2004 to 2006. Ken Hoang was widely considered to be the best player in the world during this period, earning him the nickname "The King of Smash". In addition to Ken, Christopher "Azen" McMullen, Daniel "ChuDat" Rodriguez, Joel Isai "Isai" Alvarado, Christopher "PC Chris" Szygiel, Daniel "KoreanDJ" Jung, and Jason "Mew2King" Zimmerman were considered to be some of the best players at the time. Melee was also included in Evolution Championship Series (EVO) 2007, an annual major fighting game tournament held in Las Vegas. MLG dropped Melee from its circuit in 2007, however the organization still sponsored a number of tournaments as part of the underground 2007 Smash Series for a year.

=== Decline: 2008–2013 ===
The Melee competitive scene suffered in the late 2000s, with the game being dropped from both the MLG circuit and EVO amid the release of the next game in the Smash Bros. series, Super Smash Bros. Brawl in 2008. Brawl replaced Melee in many competitive circuits; however, the former game quickly garnered a poor reputation among much of the competitive Smash Bros. community due to its slower and more defensive gameplay as well as its anti-competitive mechanics such as random tripping. In 2010, MLG picked up Brawl for its Pro Circuit for a year; during this time, Nintendo prohibited MLG from live streaming Brawl matches. The period from 2012 to 2013 is often referred to as "The Dark Age" of competitive Smash Bros. due to the temporary decline of Melee and the subsequent decline in popularity of Brawl. Nevertheless, the period did see some major tournaments such as the inaugural GENESIS in 2009 and the launch of the Apex and The Big House tournament series.

=== Resurgence and the "Five Gods": 2013–2018 ===
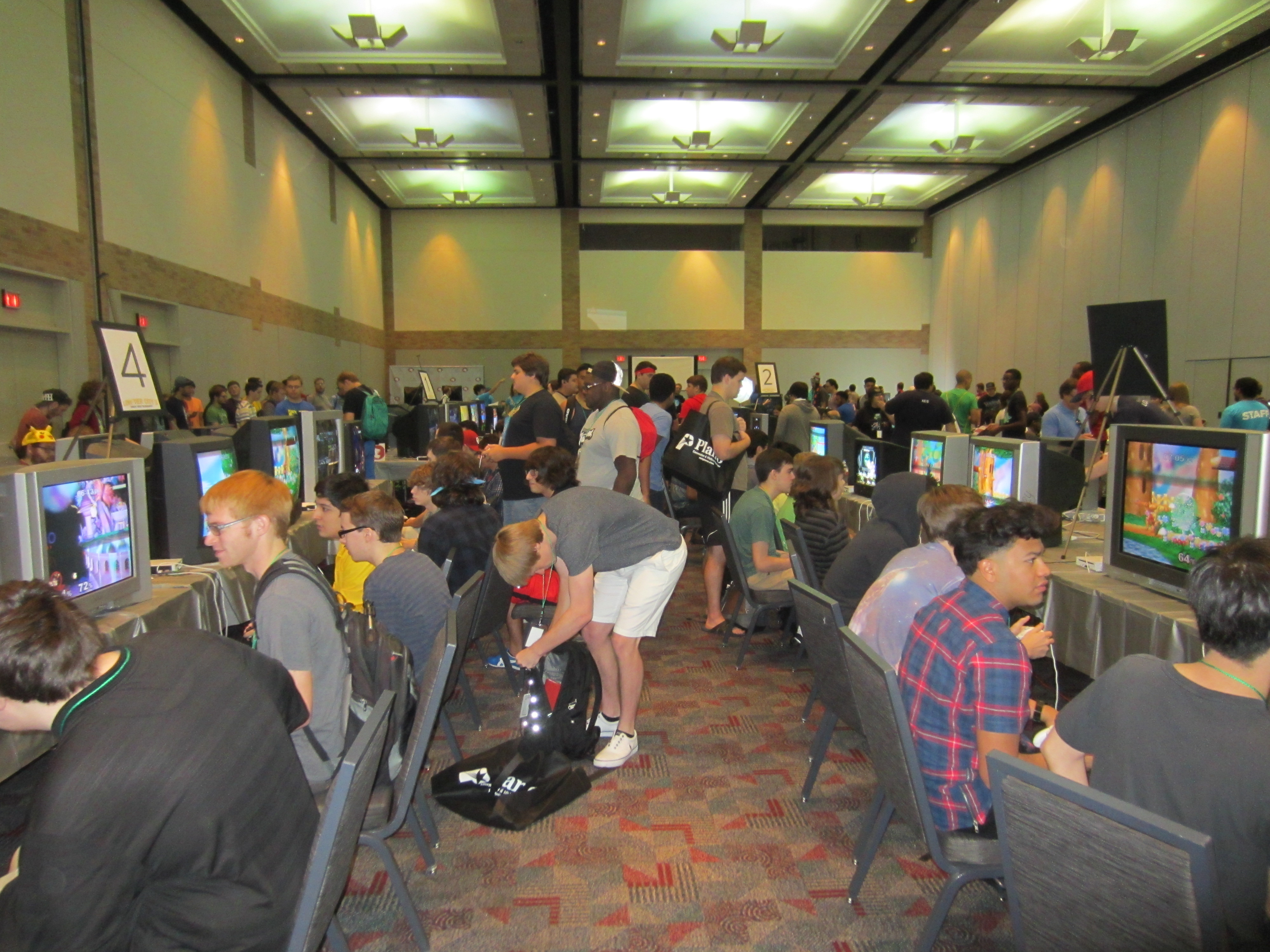
Competitors at Low Tier City 3, a 2015 tournament

Competitive Melee experienced a resurgence in popularity and support after it was again hosted at EVO 2013 after the game won a charity drive to decide the final game to be featured in its tournament lineup. Due to its large turnout and viewership that year, EVO continued including Melee in its lineup for the next five years. The competitive scene was also further popularized by the 2013 release of The Smash Brothers documentary series directed by Travis "Samox" Beauchamp. SmashBoards estimated that in 2014 around 3,242 events featuring a Smash Bros. game had occurred worldwide. This period saw a number of new and revived major tournament series enter the scene, including GENESIS, Super Smash Con, Community Effort Orlando (CEO), DreamHack, Major League Gaming (MLG), Shine and the Smash Summit invitational series. Other major tournament series included Apex and The Big House. Apex 2015 was officially sponsored by Nintendo of America, marking the first official Nintendo sponsorship of a community-run event while EVO 2016 was the largest Melee tournament of all time, with 2,376 entrants. In June 2014 Nintendo held an invitational Super Smash Bros. for Wii U tournament at E3 2014 to promote the game, in which various competitive Smash Bros. players competed in a non-standard ruleset. Smash Sisters, an initiative aimed at normalizing the participation of women at tournaments, held its first all-women bracket at GENESIS 3 in 2016.

The period from 2013 to 2018 is sometimes referred to as "The Platinum Age" or "The Era of the Five Gods", a reference to the five most dominant players of the era: Jason "Mew2King" Zimmerman, Joseph "Mango" Marquez, Kevin "PPMD" Nanney (formerly known as Dr. PeePee), Adam "Armada" Lindgren, and Juan "Hungrybox" Debiedma. William "Leffen" Hjelte became the first player to defeat all five of the "Five Gods" during this period, leading some to nickname him as "The God Slayer", and causing the top 6 players to become collectively known as the "Big 6". In 2017, Justin "Plup" McGrath became the second player in the game's history to defeat all of the "Five Gods" in tournament competition, also becoming the first player outside of the Big 6 to defeat Armada in a tournament set in seven years.

=== 2018–present ===
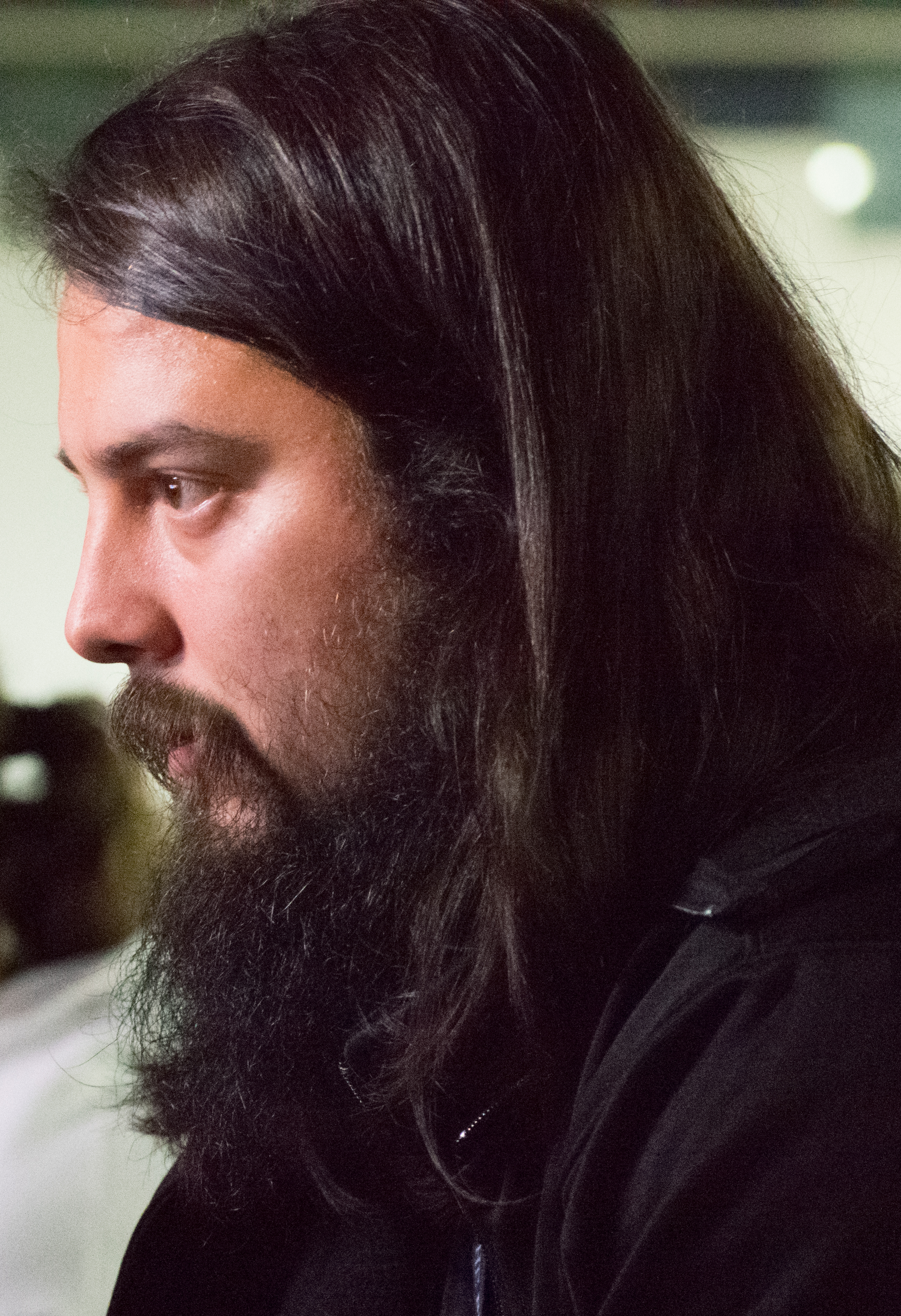
A 2021 list by PGstats ranked Joseph "Mango" Marquez as the greatest Melee player of all time.

In the late 2010s, the "Five Gods" moniker started to become less relevant as many of the "Gods" stepped back from full-time competition: PPMD went on indefinite hiatus from competition in 2016 citing health issues, Armada retired from singles competition in 2018 and Mew2King semi-retired from serious competition around the same time to focus on content creation and coaching. Leffen also faced several visa-related difficulties in competing in the United States during this time. This era has seen the relative decline of the "Five Gods" in tournament placings. Plup's first-place victory at GENESIS 5 in 2018 marked the first supermajor tournament won by a player outside of the Big 6 in several years. A tweet by Leffen referred to start of what he called the "Renaissance Era" of Melee competition.

The competitive scene was significantly affected in 2020 by the COVID-19 pandemic, shutting down virtually all in-person tournaments. However, a major milestone occurred in the summer of 2020 with the development of rollback netcode for Project Slippi, an emulated fan-made modification of Melee, which allowed for low-latency online matchmaking for the first time in the game's history. While significantly contributing to the game's accessibility during the pandemic, Project Slippi also brought new legal troubles to the competitive scene, culminating in the cancellation of The Big House 10 in 2020 after the event received a cease and desist notice from Nintendo concerning the event's planned usage of Project Slippi. The cancellation was met with a highly negative reaction from the competitive community, and led to the trending of the "#FreeMelee" hashtag on Twitter.

In July 2020, several high-profile members of the Super Smash Bros. competitive community, including top players and commentators, were accused of various forms of sexual misconduct. These included allegations of sexual harassment, sexual assault, rape, and child grooming. The wave of allegations led to the banning of several notable community figures from tournaments and many organizations dropping their sponsorships of accused players, one notable example being Gonzalo "ZeRo" Barrios, considered the best Super Smash Bros. for Wii U player of all time. Nintendo released a statement responding to the allegations, condemning "all acts of violence, harassment, and exploitation against anyone" and saying that they "stand with the victims".

In November 2021, Panda (formerly Panda Global) and Nintendo jointly announced an officially licensed Melee and Super Smash Bros. Ultimate North American championship circuit for 2022, the first ever officially licensed Melee circuit. The Big House 10 would become a part of the Panda Cup and was held that year, becoming notable for Masaya "aMSa" Chikamoto's first-place victory over Mango and Hungrybox, marking his first supermajor tournament victory alongside the first major victory for Yoshi in the game's history. The community's relationship with Panda and the Panda Cup would become strained with the news that Nintendo had allegedly forced the Smash World Tour to be cancelled just weeks before it was supposed to commence in early December, with Panda CEO Dr. Alan Bunney accused of sabotaging the event.

== Super Smash Bros. Ultimate and other games ==
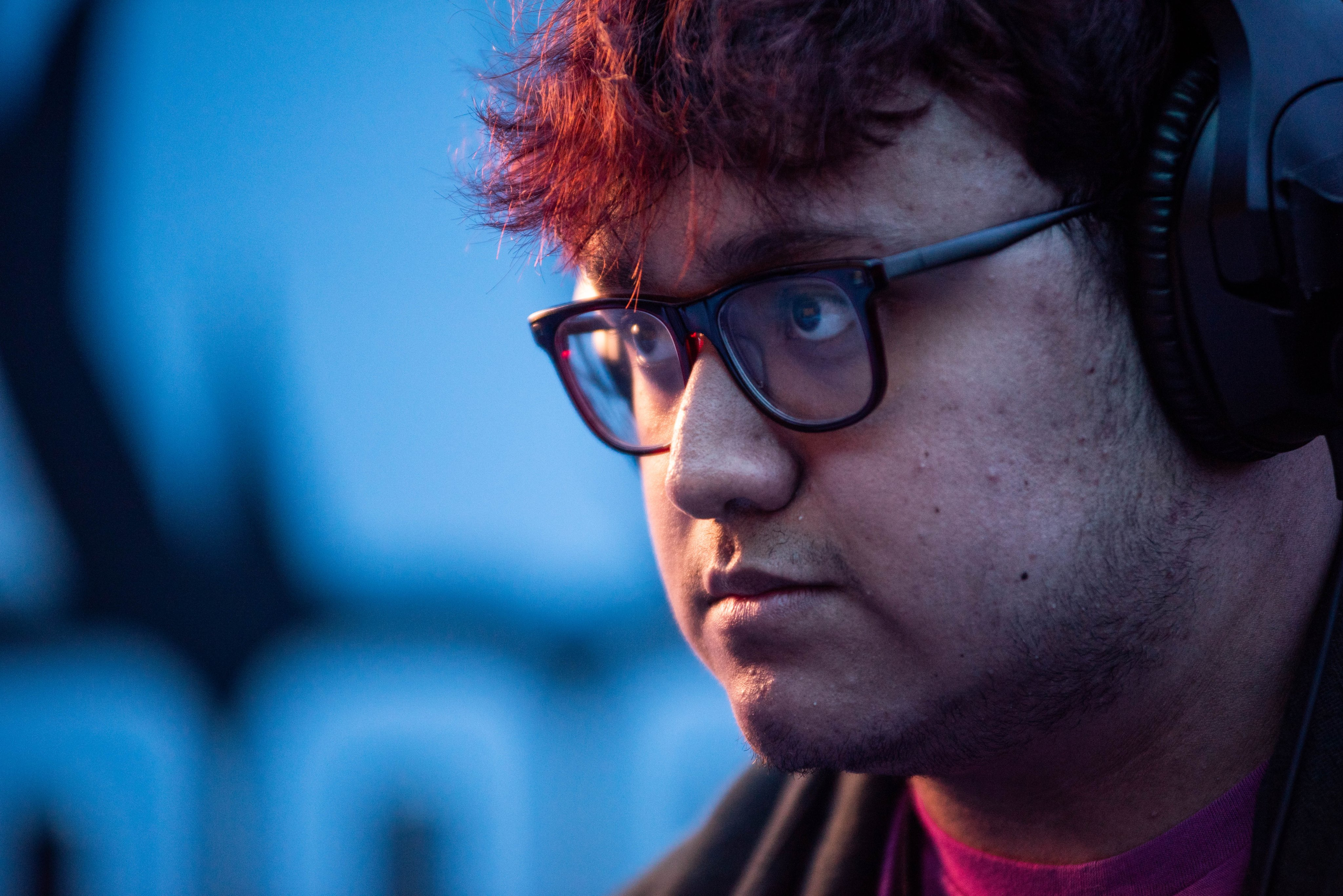
Leonardo "MkLeo" Perez is widely considered the best Super Smash Bros. Ultimate player in the world.

Competitive scenes have existed for all titles in the Smash Bros. series, with the two largest and most popular modern titles being Super Smash Bros. Ultimate and Melee. While both Ultimate and Melee share the same basic gameplay format and style and are often included in major tournaments together, the significant differences in gameplay speed, advanced tech and character matchups have led to the development of intertwined but distinct competitive scenes for the two games. Leonardo "MkLeo" Perez is widely considered the world's best Ultimate player, alongside other top players such as Edgar "Sparg0" Valdez, Gavin "Tweek" Dempsey, Sota "Zackray" Okada, and William "Glutonny" Belaïd, among others.

Smaller competitive scenes exist for the original game for Nintendo 64 and Project M, a fan-made mod of Super Smash Bros. Brawl designed to make the game resemble the faster gameplay style of Melee. Smash Bros. games with previously active competitive scenes include Brawl (2008-2014) and Super Smash Bros. for Wii U (2014-2018); however, in Norway, there are still Brawl events of comparable size to Melee and Ultimate events. Most Brawl and Wii U players have since migrated to Ultimate, with significant overlap between top professional players of the former games and current top professional Ultimate players.

== Relationship with Nintendo ==
The competitive Smash Bros. scene has been noted for its uneasy relationship with Nintendo, the series' owner and publisher. IGN journalist Matt Kim has noted how "Unlike companies like Riot or Blizzard, who work directly to manage the competitive scene built up around their games, Nintendo has studiously distanced itself, and even actively worked against a community that loves its fighting games." Nintendo has threatened legal action against several major Smash Bros. tournaments in the past, including EVO 2013 and The Big House 10, often over livestreaming rights or due to the usage of mods in the tournament, such as Project M or Project Slippi. These incidents have received a largely negative reaction from competitive players, and have sometimes resulted in the tournaments not being livestreamed or even being outright cancelled by tournament organizers. While Nintendo has occasionally sponsored community-organized tournaments, and has held its own promotional tournaments utilizing non-standardized rulesets, it has never officially licensed a Smash Bros. tournament or contributed financially to a prize pot. Nintendo's lack of support has contributed to the competitive Smash Bros. community's reputation as grassroots and community-driven. However, in November 2021, Nintendo and Panda jointly announced the first officially licensed Smash Bros. tournament circuit for North America in 2022. A separate grassroots tournament global circuit, the Smash World Tour, ran throughout 2022, with the finals expected to take place in December 2022. However, legal action from Nintendo and potential sabotage from Panda Global resulted in the finals being cancelled just 3 weeks before their scheduled date. The move was estimated to have cost tournament organizers hundreds of thousands of dollars' worth of loss.

Competitive Smash Bros. culture has also been criticized by series creator and director Masahiro Sakurai, who has argued that competitive play strays from his original vision for the series of bridging the gap between casual and skilled players. Sakurai's aversion to catering to competitive players greatly influenced the development and gameplay of Brawl, the successor to Melee, which was widely criticized by many competitive players for its deliberately slower and more casual gameplay. The competitive discontent with Brawl later spurred the development of Project M, a fan mod to make the game's gameplay more resemble that of Melee's. Project M and Project+, another fan mod, have also been at the center of legal action by Nintendo due to issues with copyright law, with many tournaments having received cease and desist notices from Nintendo upon including the mod in their game lineups.

Former Nintendo of America President Reggie Fils-Aimé defended Nintendo's history of distancing itself from the competitive community, saying that "We want to do this much more at a grassroots level than others’ visions around leagues and big up-front payments and things of that nature.”

== Competitive format ==
Games played using competitive rules are generally played with lives (known as "stocks" in-game), with the timer set, and items turned off. It is played either Double-elimination format, or a double-elimination bracket seeded from pools.

The original Super Smash Bros. starts with four stocks and an eight-minute time limit (with the time limit being modded in due to the base game not providing a time limit option); Melee and Project M likewise start with four stocks and an eight-minute time limit; Brawl starts with three stocks and an eight-minute time limit;Wii U with two and a six-minute time limit; and Ultimate with three stocks and a seven-minute time limit.

If the time runs out, the winner is determined by whoever has more stocks left; if both players have the same number of stocks, then winner is determined by whoever has the lower damage percentage. If both players have the same number of stocks and amount of damage, then, depending on the tournament, the whole match must be played again, or a shorter match with a single stock each is played. In competitive play, Sudden Death is usually ignored should the match end in a tie.

Pausing can disrupt the gameplay; thus, if a player pauses while in the middle of a match to gain an advantage, then that player must forfeit a stock or the game. In stricter tournaments, the player must forfeit a stock regardless of advantage (or lack thereof), though the pause function is usually disabled in these tournaments. To facilitate this, each game in the series starting with Melee includes a ruleset option to toggle pausing on or off.

Most matches are played in best-of-three game sets. Best-of-five sets are played anywhere from top 32 to grand finals.

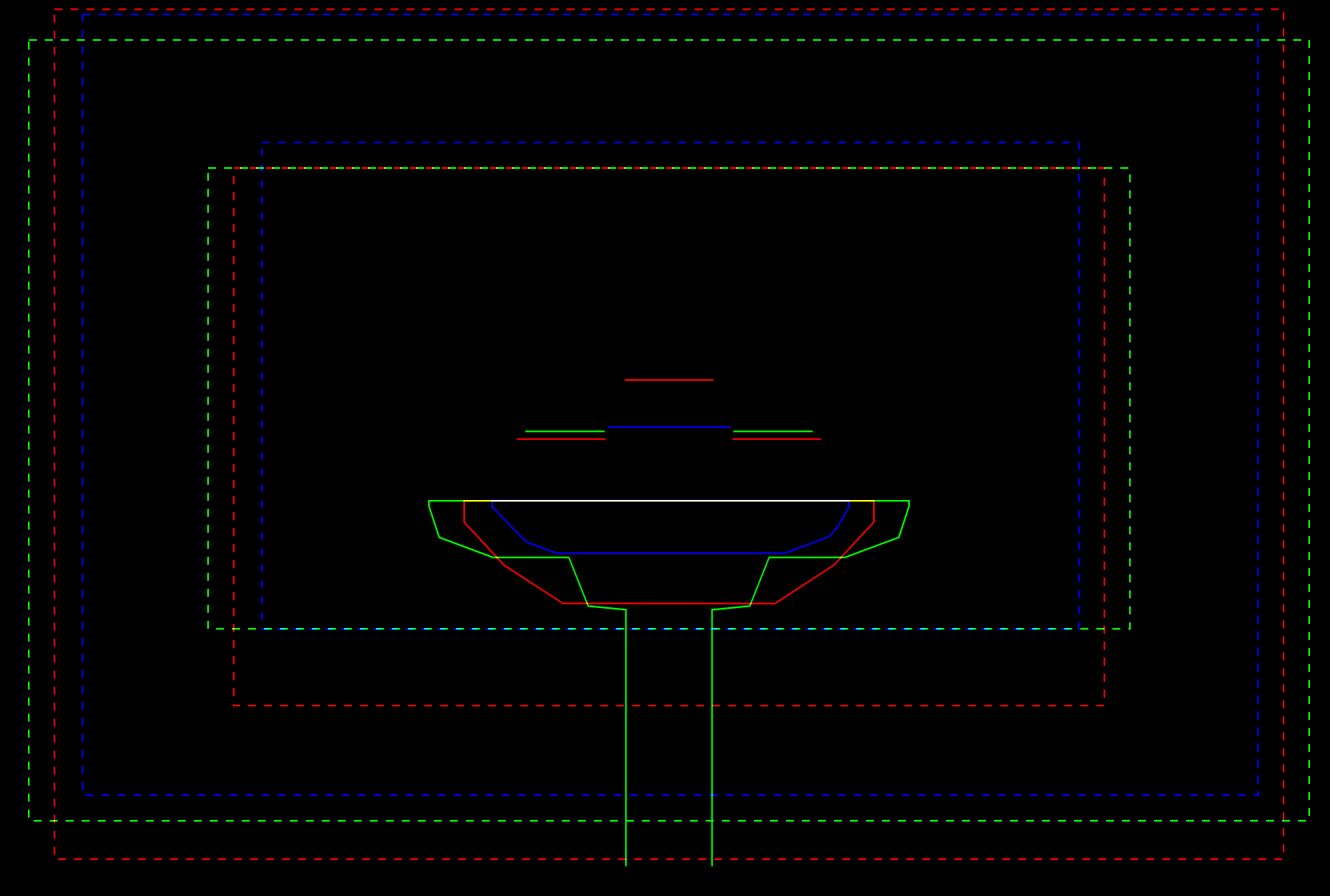
Comparison of sizes between 3 stages commonly used in competitive Ultimate: Battlefield in red, Pokémon Stadium 2 in green, and Smashville in blue. The smaller rectange represents the boundaries of the game camera, whereas the larger rectangle represents the "blast zone" where stocks are taken.

There are stages that are deemed legal by the tournament organizers; these stages are starter stages. Players strike the starter stages before a match to determine the first stage they will play on; also, players must choose their characters without the other person's knowledge for the first match. In subsequent matches there are also counterpick stages allowed. For instance, in Melee singles, the starter stages are Battlefield, Final Destination, Dream Land N64, Yoshi's Story, and Fountain of Dreams. Players use a 1-2-1 format to strike which stages they do not want to play on until one is left. Once the first match is complete, the losing player can choose any of the starter stages or they can also choose a counterpick stage – in this case, Pokémon Stadium. After the first match is complete, the losing player chooses a stage, then the winning player chooses their character, then the losing player chooses their character before heading to subsequent matches. In best-of-3 sets, the winner can ban one stage so the losing player cannot choose that stage. Generally, players cannot select a stage on which they have previously won; this rule is known as "Dave's Stupid Rule" or the "Stage Clause". While most Melee tournaments run Dave's Stupid Rule, most Ultimate tournaments are using a variant of the clause, known as "modified Dave's Stupid Rule", or mDSR. In mDSR tournaments, players are only barred from selecting the last stage they've won on in that set. Most tournaments allow the players to forgo these rules if both players agree to it. This is known as the gentlemen's clause. Juan "Hungrybox" Debiedma is a notable user of the gentlemen's clause in competitive Melee, as he will often offer to gentleman to Battlefield, rather than to play on Fountain of Dreams, one of the game's less popular tournament-viable stages.

Competitive play may be either singles or doubles. In singles, two players face off against each other. In doubles, two teams of two players fight each other. Sharing stocks with teammates is allowed. Friendly fire is enabled, so teammates can damage or save each other. This is to ensure fairness, as certain combinations of characters in teams can prove to be overpowered. It also ensures that two-on-one situations aren't overwhelmingly tilted in the winning team's favor. It also adds a couple of extra strategies. For example, after a Jigglypuff player uses the move "Rest", which immobilizes them for several seconds or until attacked, a teammate could attack Jigglypuff with a weak move, preventing an opponent from causing more damage. Super Smash Bros. for Wii U adds an 8-player mode, which allows triples and quadruples teams, although there have been comparatively few such tournaments. In Ultimate, many tournaments have held side-events using a game mode called 'Squad Strike', which is a game mode that enables players to fight against each other with a squad of either 3 or 5 fighters.

In addition, a player gets port priority when he or she wins in a best-of-one of, usually, rock-paper-scissors. Smasher Mew2King found out that the player who is Player 1 or is closest to Player 1 has priority in attacks or grabs that hit each other at the same time. Also, a neutral start may be enacted if a player suggests it.

In some Brawl rulesets, Meta Knight is either banned from certain stages or is completely banned from tournaments due to the overpowered nature of his attacks, while in certain doubles rulesets, certain team compositions are banned, such as double Cloud in Wii U and double Meta Knight in Brawl, due to synergy, overpowered attacks, and strategies that are more effective with additional fighters.

== Wombo Combo meme ==
"Wombo Combo" is an Internet meme from a December 2008 Melee doubles match that took place at the SCSA West Coast Circuit tournament. The match featured Jeff "SilentSpectre" Leung and Mitchell Tang on one team and Julian Zhu and Joey "Lucky" Aldama on the other. In the match, as Lucky lost all of his lives, SilentSpectre and Tang then performed several moves quickly in tandem, removing Zhu's ability to respond. The commentators of the match – Brandon "HomeMadeWaffles" Collier, Phil DeBerry, and Joseph "Mang0" Marquez – exclaimed "Happy Feet, Wombo Combo. That ain't Falco". They then screamed wildly as SilentSpectre and Tang locked Zhu in a game-winning combo. The meme is the subject of a mini documentary, and is one of the memes seen in the Wii U eShop game Meme Run. It has also been used in many "MLG Montage" parody videos.

== Tournament results ==
- Brawl
- Melee
- Project M
- Super Smash Bros.
- Ultimate (major tournaments)
- Wii U (major tournaments)
