= List of Super Smash Bros. (video game) tournaments =

This list includes tournament results for Super Smash Bros. on the Nintendo 64.

== Major tournament results ==
Tournament	Location	Date	Format	Entrants	Prize pool	1st	2nd	3rd	4th
GENESIS 2	Antioch, California	July 15–17, 2011	Singles	22	US$330	SuPeRbOoMfAn	Isai	JaimieHR	Kefit
Apex 2012	Rutgers University-New Brunswick	January 6–8, 2012	Singles	64	US$320	SuPeRbOoMfAn	Isai	JaimieHR	Kefit
Apex 2012	Rutgers University-New Brunswick	January 6–8, 2012	Doubles	8	US$80	Isai, Nintendude	SuPeRbOoMfAn, JaimieHR	Sensei, King Funk	Firo, Ownasaurus
Apex 2013	Rutgers University-New Brunswick	January 11–13, 2013	Singles	96	US$1,460	Kikoushi	Isai	SuPeRbOoMfAn	Ruoka Dancho
Apex 2014	Somerset, New Jersey	January 17–19, 2014	Singles	157	US$1,770	Isai	Moyashi	SuPeRbOoMfAn	Mariguas
Zenith 2014	Brooklyn, New York	March 1, 2014	Singles	55	US$550	SuPeRbOoMfAn	KeroKeroppi	Wizzrobe	The Z
Apex 2015	Somerset, New Jersey	January 30–February 1, 2015	Singles	188	US$2,219	SuPeRbOoMfAn	tacos	Wizzrobe	Mariguas
Super Smash Con	Chantilly, Virginia	August 6–8, 2015	Singles	154	US$6,520	SuPeRbOoMfAn	KeroKeroppi	tacos	Wizzrobe
Super Smash Con	Chantilly, Virginia	August 6–8, 2015	Doubles	33	US$780	SuPeRbOoMfAn, tacos	Fireblaster, Revan	LD, The Protagonist	Dr. Lampy, Lord Narwhal
GENESIS 3	San Jose, California	January 15–17, 2016	Singles	239	US$2,380	wario	SuPeRbOoMfAn	Wangera	Isai
GENESIS 3	San Jose, California	January 15–17, 2016	Doubles	47	US$940	JaimieHR, SuPeRbOoMfAn	tacos, The Z	Isai, Rith	wario, wangera
Pound 2016	McLean, Virginia	April 2–3, 2016	Singles	107		SuPeRbOoMfAn	tacos	KeroKeroppi	Revan
Pound 2016	McLean, Virginia	April 2–3, 2016	Doubles	30		SuPeRbOoMfAn, tacos	Nintendude, Firo	Bark Sanchez, Darkhorse	Revan, fireblaster
Get On My Level 2016	Toronto, Ontario	May 20–22, 2016	Singles	83		SuPeRbOoMfAn	The Z	KeroKeroppi	Revan
Super Smash Con 2016	Chantilly, Virginia	August 11–14, 2016	Singles	314		SuPeRbOoMfAn	COG | Wizzrobe	Isai	Mariguas
Super Smash Con 2016	Chantilly, Virginia	August 11–14, 2016	Doubles	96		Isai, Alvin	SuPeRbOoMfAn, JaimeHR	tacos, The Z	Mariguas, Dext3r
Shine 2016	Boston, Massachusetts	August 26–28, 2016	Singles	109		SuPeRbOoMfAn	tacos	Bark Sanchez	Fireblaster
Shine 2016	Boston, Massachusetts	August 26–28, 2016	Doubles	20		SuPeRbOoMfAn, tacos	Fireblaster, Nintendude	Bark Sanchez, Madrush21	Shears, Marbles
Don't Park On The Grass	Seattle, Washington	December 17–18, 2016	Singles	73		SuPeRbOoMfAn	Mariguas	Wizzrobe	Bark Sanchez
Don't Park On The Grass	Seattle, Washington	December 17–18, 2016	Doubles	20		Wizzrobe, SuPeRbOoMfAn	Fireblaster, Nintendude	Jason, Mariguas	Bark Sanchez, Madrush21
GENESIS 4	San Jose, California	January 15–17, 2017	Singles	185		Alvin	PG | SuPeRbOoMfAn	kysk	Dext3r
GENESIS 4	San Jose, California	January 15–17, 2017	Doubles	43		JaimieHR, SuPeRbOoMfAn	tacos, The Z	Mariguas, Dext3er	Taimai, kysk
BEAST 7	Gothenburg, Sweden	February 17–19, 2017	Singles	43		Isai	Revan	BarkSanchez	Shears
CEO Dreamland	Orlando, Florida	April 14–16, 2017	Singles	53		Alvin	BarkSanchez	Fireblaster	SheerMadness
CEO Dreamland	Orlando, Florida	April 14–16, 2017	Doubles	10		NTA, Alvin	BarkSanchez, Nintendude	Fireblaster, $$$ Jim $$$	Tubby!, Marbles
