= Mew2King =

American esports player (born 1989)

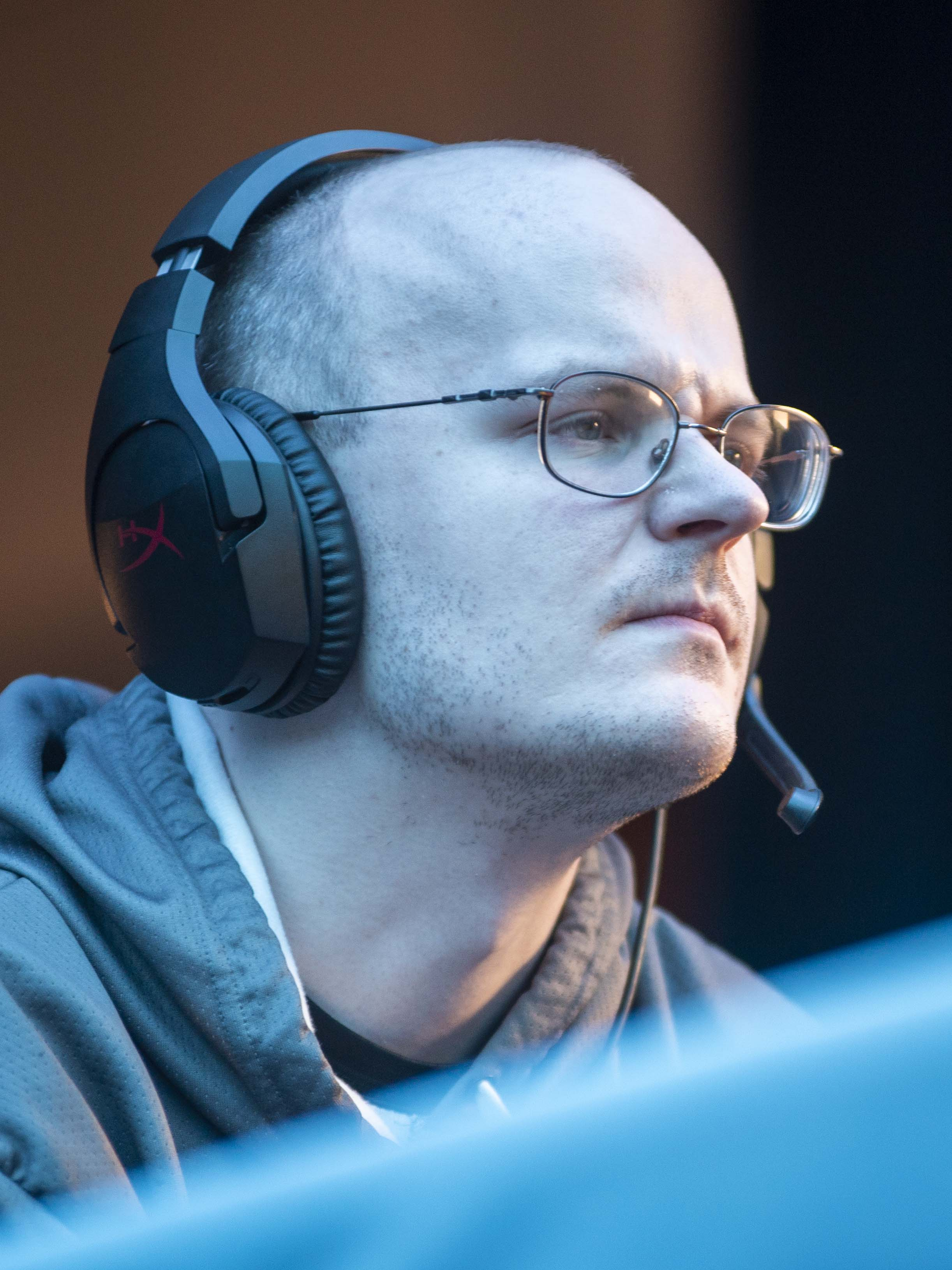
- Zimmerman in 2020

Personal information
- Name: Jason Zimmerman
- Nicknames: M2K; The Robot
- Born: Jason Sheldon Zimmerman; February 5, 1989 (age 37)
- Nationality: American

Career information
- Games: Super Smash Bros.; Super Smash Bros. Melee; Super Smash Bros. Brawl; Project M; Super Smash Bros. Wii U; Super Smash Bros. Ultimate
- Playing career: 2005–2020

Team history
- 2009–2014: Empire Arcadia
- 2011–2014: CLASH Tournaments
- 2012–2014: Play-For-Keeps
- 2015–2016: COGnitive Gaming
- 2016–2020: Echo Fox

Career highlights and awards
- Super Smash Bros. Melee (9 majors won): Cataclysm 3 champion (2007); MELEE-FC Diamond champion (2007); Super Champ Combo champion (2007); The Big House 3 champion (2013); Pat's House 2 champion (2014); Shine champion (2016); Community Effort Orlando Dreamland champion (2017); Canada Cup 2017 champion; Smash Summit 6 champion (2018); Super Smash Bros. Brawl (11 majors won): 3x MLG champion (Orlando 2010, Columbus 2010, Raleigh 2010); EVO champion (2009); Clash of the Titans IV champion (2009); WHOBO champion (2009); Critical Hit 3 champion (2009); GENESIS 2 champion (2011); KTAR 8 champion (2013); Get On My Level 2014 champion; Super Smash Con champion (2015)

Twitch information
- Channel: mew2king
- Followers: 263,000
- Last updated: January 2024

Jason Sheldon Zimmerman (born February 5, 1989), known by his gamertag Mew2King, commonly shortened to M2K, is an American former professional Super Smash Bros. player from Cinnaminson, New Jersey. He is one of the historical "Five Gods" of Melee, along with Juan "Hungrybox" Debiedma, Adam "Armada" Lindgren, Kevin "PPMD" Nanney, and Joseph "Mang0" Marquez, and is considered one of the greatest Super Smash Bros. Brawl players of all time. He has also competed at a top-level in Super Smash Bros. for Wii U, Super Smash Bros. Ultimate and Project M.

In Melee, Zimmerman primarily plays Marth, Sheik, and Fox, while he plays Meta Knight in Brawl. He uses his namesake character Mewtwo, as well as Fox and Mario, in Project M and specializes as Kirby in the original Super Smash Bros. game. In Super Smash Bros. for Wii U, Zimmerman's primary character is Cloud. Zimmerman is known for his extremely methodical and logical style of play, as well as his detailed knowledge of frame data in Melee, earning him the nickname The Robot. He is known to play Melee using a claw-like grip on his controller. For his skill across every Smash Bros. game, he is regarded by some as the greatest overall Smash Bros. player of all time. From May 2016 to January 2020, he was a member of the professional esports organization Echo Fox.

== Gaming career ==
Zimmerman began competing in tournaments in 2005 at the age of 16. Kashan "Chillindude" Khan described Zimmerman as having little natural aptitude for the game, becoming good through practicing a lot. Previously, in 2004, he spent over 2,000 hours with help from SuperDoodleMan collecting data about various attacks and movements in Melee. During 2006, Zimmerman went from being relatively unknown to being one of the best players in the game. In 2007, he managed to place 9th at EVO World 2007. Zimmerman was considered the best Melee and Brawl player from 2008–2009. From 2010–2014, his tournament placing declined and he began losing to improving newer players. Zimmerman and Wyatt "ADHD" Beekman, were banned by Major League Gaming from competing in MLG Dallas 2010, after the two had allegedly conspired to manipulate brackets at Brawl event at MLG DC 2010. The ban came after ADHD had stated that he paid Zimmerman US$300 to lose the loser's bracket final, a violation of MLG rules. MLG dropped Brawl from their pro circuit at the end of 2010.

For most of 2013, Zimmerman had not won a major tournament all year until he went on a winning streak where he won virtually every tournament he attended, including those with Mango present, whom he had not beaten for several years. In 2014, Zimmerman lost to aMSa in winners quarters and Armada in losers finals at Kings of Cali 4. Zimmerman finished 2nd to Mango at Big House 4 in Romulus, Michigan. After a complex leveling game, Juan "Hungrybox" Debiedma defeated Zimmerman at Paragon Orlando 2015.

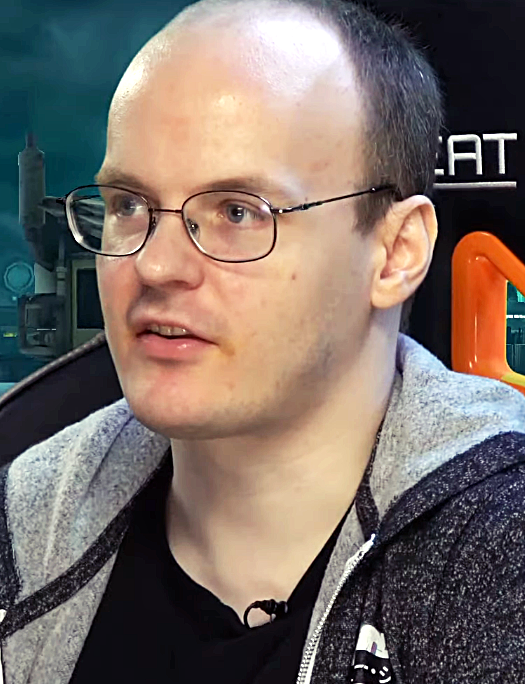
Zimmerman in 2019

From 2009 to 2014, Zimmerman was a member of Empire Arcadia (EMP), a company that has also sponsored e-sports players such as Justin Wong. He left the organization after having issues with back payment from the organization. Zimmerman alleges that since 2009 EMP president Isaiah "Triforce" Johnson has owed him "US$5k total more/less" and has lent Johnson more than US$1,000. From 2011 to 2014, Zimmerman was sponsored by CLASH Tournaments (CT). From 2012 to 2014, Zimmerman was signed with Vancouver-based Play-For-Keeps, an online e-sports betting service.

Zimmerman has supported Pastime Gaming and Most Valuable Gaming since late 2014 and started working as a business manager for the latter. By late 2014 to early 2015, Zimmerman began focusing his time on Super Smash Bros. for Wii U and online streaming and plans on playing fewer online tournaments due to hand problems. His tournament placings have also declined, placing tied for 9th at Apex 2015. In April 2015 he became a member of esports team COGnitive Gaming. Around June 2015, Zimmerman suffered a hand injury and missed CEO 2015 and EVO 2015. He did however attend Super Smash Con in August 2015 where he placed 2nd after losing to Leffen. On August 31, he defeated Leffen in the grand finals of PAX Prime 2015, thereby ending the streak of Swedish players winning national tournaments. At Paragon Los Angeles 2015, Zimmerman placed second, losing to Mango in Grand Finals.

Zimmerman finished 9–12th in Melee singles at GENESIS 3 in January. In early April, Zimmerman left COGnitive. On April 17, 2016, Zimmerman joined Echo Fox.

Zimmerman finished in 1st place in Melee singles at Smash Summit 6 in May 2018. Zimmerman did not lose in the bracket stage, managing to defeat Armada twice, including during the grand finals. He became the first player to win a Smash Summit event outside of Armada and Hungrybox.

On February 4, 2024, Zimmerman explained in a video on his YouTube channel why he had been absent from competing, citing toxicity in the Melee community.

== Personal life ==
Zimmerman was born on February 5, 1989. His handle comes from the Pokémon Mewtwo. He grew up in Cinnaminson Township, New Jersey, and is a 2007 graduate of Cinnaminson High School. He attended Lorain County Community College before transferring to Camden County College, from where he has an associate degree in game design/computer science. He said that he had to do an additional half-year of school again because several credits would not transfer. He is uninterested in pursuing a bachelor's degree.

Zimmerman has been diagnosed with Asperger syndrome, obsessive–compulsive disorder and attention deficit hyperactivity disorder and has had depression and suicidal thoughts for most of his life. He has attributed much of his social growth to the Smash community.

Zimmerman is a full-time video game player who streams on Twitch and attended tournaments almost every week in 2014. He is a co-owner of video game tournament organizing company Most Valuable Gaming. He was included in the Forbes 30 Under 30 "Games" List for 2019.

A 2009 photo of Zimmerman getting kissed by a girl at a Super Smash Bros. tournament has become a widely circulated viral image across the internet, including an article written on the subject by ESPN.
