= Genesis 3 =

Genesis 3 may refer to:

- Chapter 3 of the biblical Book of Genesis describing the fall of man
- A model of the Sega Genesis game console
- The 2013 edition of the esports tournament GENESIS
