= Mr. Nintendo =

Mr. Nintendo may refer to:

- Shigeru Miyamoto, Japanese video game designer known for his work with Nintendo
- Mario, Popular video game character and the mascot of Nintendo
- Mang0, A professional Super Smash Brothers Melee player, who was invited to the Super Smash Brothers E3 2018 Invitational
