= PPMD =

American professional esports player

Personal information
- Name: Kevin Nanney
- Nickname(s): PPMD, Dr. PeePee
- Born: September 25, 1990 (age 36)

Career information
- Games: Super Smash Bros. Melee; Project M
- Playing career: 2009–2016

Team history
- 2013–2014: VGBootCamp
- 2014–2021: Evil Geniuses
- 2021–2023: Golden Guardians

Career highlights and awards
- (7 majors won): 2× Apex champion (2014, 2015); Revival of Melee 3 champion (2010); Pound champion (2011); Zenith 2012 champion; Kings of Cali champion (2012); SKTAR 3 champion (2014)

Twitch information
- Channel: ppmd
- Followers: 80,000
- Last updated: January 2025

Kevin Nanney, also known by PPMD and formerly known as Dr. PeePee, is an inactive American professional Super Smash Bros. Melee player. He is considered one of the historical "Five Gods" of Melee, alongside Jason "Mew2King" Zimmerman, Joseph "Mango" Marquez, Adam "Armada" Lindgren, and Juan "Hungrybox" DeBiedma. He is a two-time champion of the Apex tournament series and was ranked as one of the top six players in the world from 2010 to 2015, after which he was removed from rankings due to inactivity. Nanney uses Falco and Marth and is known for his intelligent and patient playstyle. A 2021 list compiled by PGstats ranked Nanney as the seventh-greatest Melee player of all time.

Nanney entered into a hiatus from professional competition in 2016, citing health issues, and has not entered a singles tournament since. However, Nanney has remained active on social media and Twitch.

== Gaming career ==
Nanney garnered attention in 2009 after placing higher than Mango at Revival of Melee 2 and finishing runner up to Hungrybox. Nanney won the tournament's next incarnation in 2010. He placed 5th at Apex 2012 after losing to eventual 4th place Javier "Javi" Ruiz. Next year at Apex 2013 he placed 2nd after losing to Armada in the Grand Finals. On July 16 Nanney became sponsored by Twitch streaming channel VGBootCamp.

In 2014, Nanney won Apex 2014, the second largest tournament at the time. In June Nanney won SKTAR 3 beating Mew2King in the finals and automatically qualifying for MLG Anaheim 2014. He finished 4th at MLG Anaheim despite being the favorite to win. Nanney was invited to the Nintendo organized Super Smash Bros. Invitational at the E3 2014 to play Super Smash Bros. for Wii U, pre-release, and received the Fan-Favorite Award.

In May 2014 he left VGBootCamp and became a member of Evil Geniuses as their first Super Smash Bros. player. In 2015 Nanney became a repeat Apex champion when he beat Armada after Armada forced a bracket reset. Nanney then placed 5th in doubles at Bad Moon Rising on March 14–15, 2015, with his good friend and former rival Adam "L0zR" Jones. Nanney and Jones performed very well as a team in doubles tournaments earlier in Melee's life. Nanney competed only in doubles, and not singles, at this event. He placed third at EVO 2015, only his second singles tournament of the year. He was sent to losers in a rematch with Armada and then eliminated by Hungrybox in the Losers Final. Nanney won Canada Cup 2015 on October 30 – November 1, 2015, over notable Samus player James "Duck" Ma. He placed 5th at Smash Summit on November 5–8, 2015. On January 15–17, 2016 he got 6th at GENESIS 3.

At the Battle of the Five Gods tournament on March 17–19, 2016, Nanney won two sets and lost one in Group B of the group stage, qualifying for the Playoffs Group. There, Nanney won no sets and lost four, leading him to not qualify for the finals Bracket, and finish in 10th place. At this event, Nanney also participated in a recorded panel where the rest of the "Five Gods" besides Hungrybox, who was not available for the session, discussed their thoughts about each other.

Nanney announced he would not be attending EVO 2016 citing health issues as the reason for this decision. In 2020, he indicated that it was chronic fatigue syndrome that prevents him from competing.

On July 1, 2017, Nanney participated in the doubles tournament at Bad Moon Rising 2, competing only in doubles and teaming up with Adam "L0zR" Jones once again. Nanney decided to enter this tournament to support his friend in Jones' decidedly final tournament appearance. The duo eventually finished at 4th place in the tournament, including a remarkable come-from-behind victory over Team Liquid's team of Hungrybox and Hungrybox's coach, Luis "Crunch" Rosias, in the Losers Quarterfinal.

In 2021, Nanney was announced as a new signing by Golden Guardians, along with fellow Melee player Edgard "n0ne" L. Sheleby and commentator Kris "Toph" Aldenderfer. The organization released its Melee team in late 2023.

Nanney trains an hour a day on average. He has cited one of the reasons for his success as a player due to his ability to outplay his opponents psychologically by forcing them to make bad decisions.

== Personal life ==
Nanney is a 2009 graduate of Crest High School in Shelby, North Carolina. He has a bachelor's degree in psychology from the University of North Carolina at Greensboro. He currently lives in Raleigh, North Carolina. His younger brother Alex "Twitch" Nanney is also a competitive Smash player.

Nanney struggled with depression over the years, which has limited his ability to travel to events and at times he has found motivation in the game difficult.

Nanney has expressed interest in playing competitive Melee for a living.

After a hiatus, Nanney began streaming on his Twitch channel again on April 23, 2019.
