= Armada (gamer) =

Swedish esports player (born 1993)

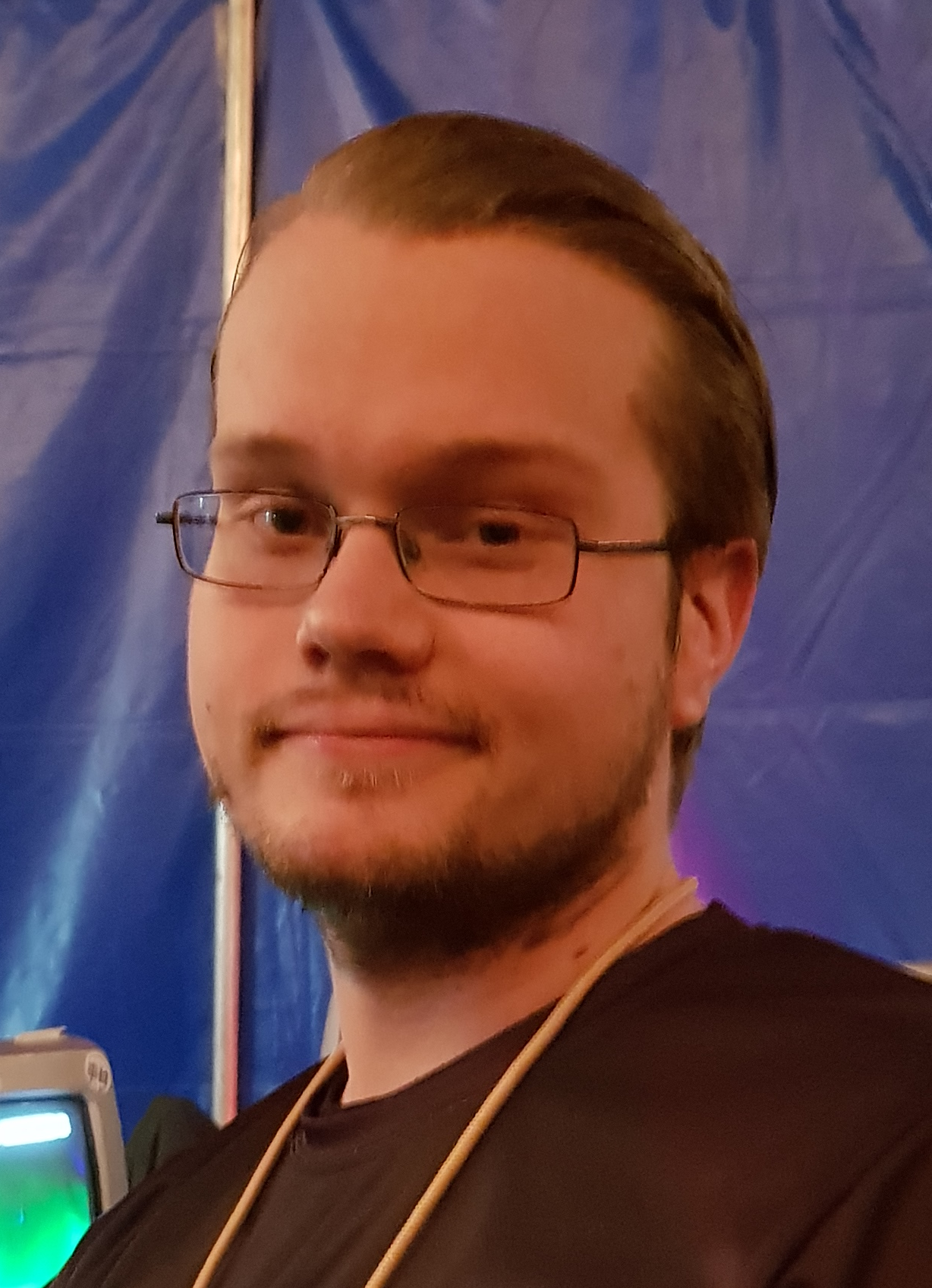
- Armada in 2018

Personal information
- Name: Adam Lindgren
- Nickname: Swedish Sniper
- Born: 28 March 1993 (age 33)

Current team
- Team: Alliance
- Game(s): Super Smash Bros. Melee; Super Smash Bros. Ultimate; Project M Super Mario 64
- League(s): Major League Gaming; Evolution Championship Series

Career information
- Playing career: 2003–2019

Team history
- 2009–2014: Empire Arcadia
- 2014: Play 4 Keeps
- 2014–2019: Alliance

Career highlights and awards
- Melee (22 majors won): 4x Smash Summit champion (2015-2017); 3× Genesis champion (2011, 2016, 2017); 2× Apex champion (2012, 2013); 2× EVO champion (2015, 2017); Smashers' Reunion: Melee Grande champion (2012); Super Sweet champion (2014); Community Effort Orlando champion (2014); I'm Not Yelling! champion (2015); Sandstorm champion (2015); The Big House 5 champion (2015); Canada Cup 2016 champion; DreamHack champion (2016); UGC Smash Open champion (2016); Smash 'N' Splash champion (2018); Super Smash Con champion (2018); Project M: Apex champion (2014)

Twitch information
- Channel: armadaugs
- Followers: 152,000
- Last updated: January 2025

Adam Lindgren (born 28 March 1993), better known as Armada, is a Swedish former professional Super Smash Bros. player. He is widely considered one of the greatest Super Smash Bros. Melee players of all time and the greatest Melee Peach player of all time. Lindgren has won several major tournaments: he is a three-time champion of GENESIS, two-time champion of EVO, two-time champion of Apex and one-time champion of The Big House. Considered one of the historical "Five Gods" of Melee, alongside Jason "Mew2King" Zimmerman, Joseph "Mang0" Marquez, Juan "Hungrybox" DeBiedma, and Kevin "PPMD" Nanney, Lindgren was ranked one of the top two Melee players in the world every year from the beginning of formal rankings in 2013 until his retirement from singles tournaments in 2018, with Lindgren ranked as the number one Melee player in the world in 2015 and 2016. A 2021 list compiled by PGstats ranked Lindgren as the second-greatest Melee player of all time.

He uses Peach and Fox, and formerly used Young Link as a secondary character. Lindgren rose to fame playing Peach exclusively, but he added Fox as a secondary in early 2015 in order to deal with a select few opponents. He is also considered one of the best doubles players in the world and is famous for teaming with both of his brothers Andreas "Android" and Alexander "Aniolas" Lindgren, as well as with Mew2King. Lindgren has also played Super Smash Bros. Ultimate and Project M competitively, primarily playing Inkling in the former and Peach and Pit in the latter. Lindgren has been nicknamed the Swedish Sniper due to his precision with projectile attacks.

Lindgren retired from professional Melee singles tournaments in September 2018, citing declining interest in the game. Since 2020, he has instead focused on speedrunning the game Super Mario 64 and livestreaming on Twitch.

== Career ==
=== Super Smash Bros. competition ===
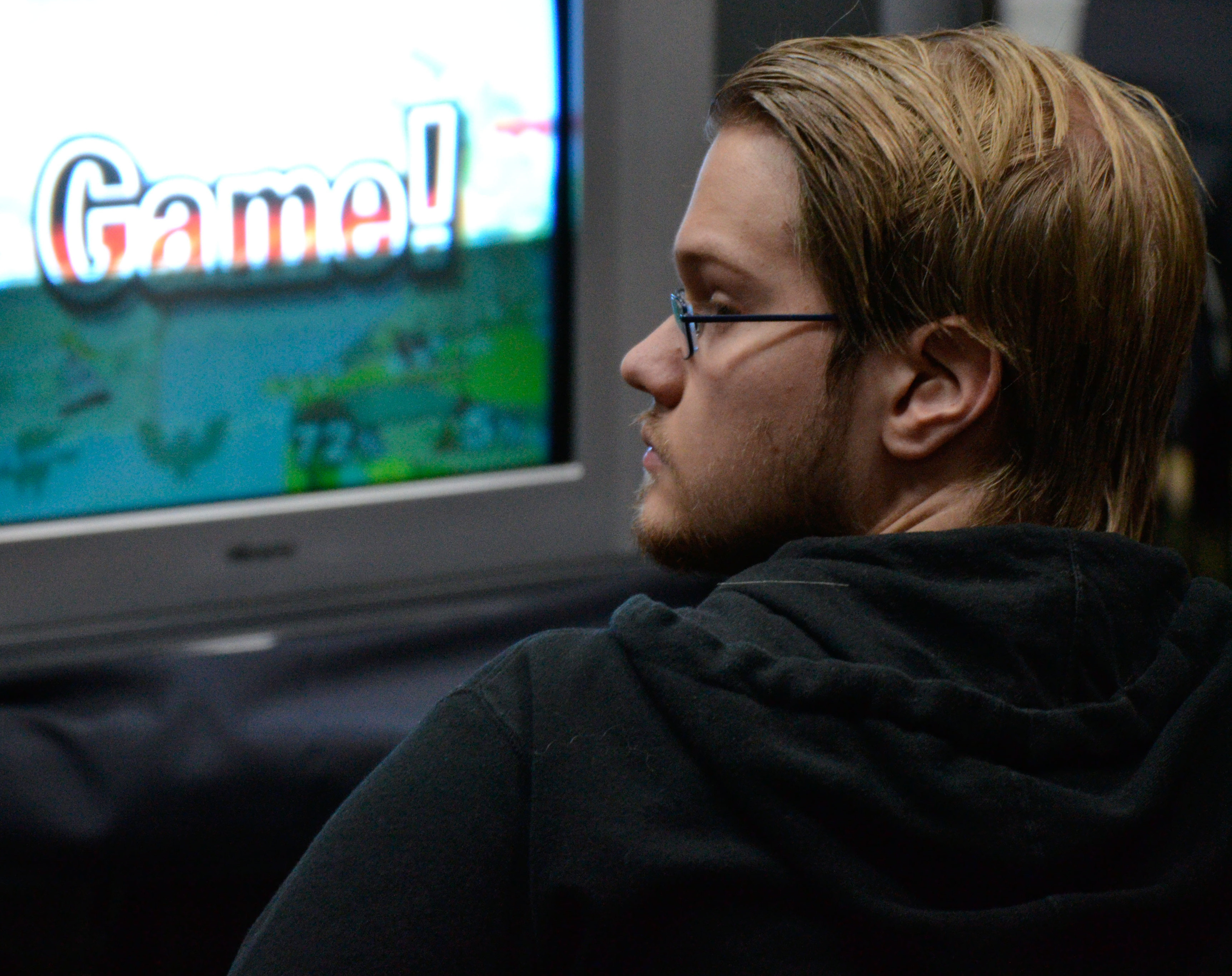
Lindgren at The Big House in 2016

Lindgren started his gaming career in 2003 competing in the Swedish Nintendo Championship. Lindgren came to prominence in 2007 finishing 4th at The Renaissance of Smash 4, his first national tournament. Seven months later, he finished 3rd at Epita Smash Arena 2, the largest tournament in Europe at the time, defeating top ranked Japanese player, Masashi, before losing to Ryota "Captain Jack" Yoshida.

In 2009, Lindgren had firmly established himself as the strongest player in Europe and decided to enter GENESIS, a tournament held in Antioch, California, which was attended by the best players in the larger and more prominent American community. Many Americans did not expect Lindgren to do well, but he shocked the country by reaching the finals of the tournament, upsetting top American players such as Mew2King and Mang0. Lindgren would eventually lose in Grand Finals to Mang0, but GENESIS established Lindgren as a legitimate contender for best in the world and was the start of a prolific rivalry between Lindgren and Mang0.

Each passing year, Lindgren was ranked progressively higher. In July 2011, Lindgren won the major tournament at the time, GENESIS 2, defeating number one ranked player, Mang0. Lindgren remained undefeated worldwide for two years until EVO 2013 where he lost the title and 1st rank back to Mang0.

After Apex 2013, Lindgren announced his retirement from competitive Melee although he did return to compete in EVO 2013, where he placed 4th, losing to PPMD 0–2 in winners' bracket and being eliminated by Mang0 0–2 in losers' semis. He returned to the scene a year later, with B.E.A.S.T, a tournament held in his hometown of Gothenburg which he helped to organize, as his first tournament back.

Lindgren also had a fairly short-lived, but very successful career in Project M, winning Apex 2014's Project M title by defeating Mew2King in grand finals. On 6 November 2014 he left Empire Arcadia and became sponsored by professional gaming team Alliance.

Lindgren initially showed some interest in Super Smash Bros. for Wii U stating that he found it considerably different from Melee and felt that he needed to spend more time playing it, but has not publicly practiced or competed in the game since a short time after its release. Since 2015, Lindgren has switched from using only Peach to both Peach and Fox in tournaments. He cites Fox's ability to put mental pressure on opponents as a reason for this change. Lindgren faced PPMD in the Grand Finals of Apex 2015, while coming from the losers bracket, but eventually lost after forcing a bracket reset. Lindgren was the EVO 2015 Melee champion after defeating Hungrybox in the Finals. By winning EVO, Lindgren received the largest single prize ever awarded in a Melee tournament at that time.

After winning EVO 2015, Melee It On Me (MIOM) ranked Lindgren as the best Melee player for the 2015 Summer SSBMRank, ahead of Leffen and Mang0.

At The Big House 5 in Dearborn, Michigan, Lindgren and his Europe crew lost to SoCal, placing 2nd. In doubles, Lindgren won with his brother Android, beating Mew2King and Hungrybox in Grand Finals. In Singles, he beat Hungrybox 3–2 in Grand Finals to win the tournament. Lindgren was ranked the number one player in the world on the Melee it On Me (MIOM) year end SSBMRank for 2015.

Lindgren continued his tournament success in 2016 and 2017, winning events such as GENESIS 3, Dreamhack Winter 2016, GENESIS 4, and EVO 2017 as well as a multitude of doubles events with his teammate and brother Android. In addition, Lindgren won the first four iterations of the highly prestigious invitational tournament series Smash Summit. In doing so, Lindgren became the first Melee player to win the same major tournament series three and four times consecutively.

Lindgren's lowest placing in his entire Melee career, excluding tournaments which he forfeit or did not seriously compete, is 5th place at both Paragon Orlando 2015 and Get On My Level 2016.

Lindgren retired from professional Melee singles tournaments in September 2018, citing declining interest in the game. He continued to compete in doubles tournaments with his brother Andreas "Android" Lindgren until 2019.

=== Speedrunning ===
Lindgren began speedrunning the 70 star category of Super Mario 64 in 2020 and is currently 8th in the world. He also runs a YouTube channel with over 117,000 subscribers.

== Personal life ==
Lindgren has 10 siblings, two of whom, Alexander "Aniolas" and Andreas "Android", also play Melee competitively. Lindgren formerly worked as a substitute teacher in Gothenburg, but now dedicates his time fully to competing, producing YouTube videos, and streaming on Twitch.

Lindgren is one of the subjects of the documentary Metagame, a sequel to The Smash Brothers by producer Travis "Samox" Beauchamp, which premiered on a Twitch livestream in 2020.
