= Mang0 =

American esports player (born 1991)

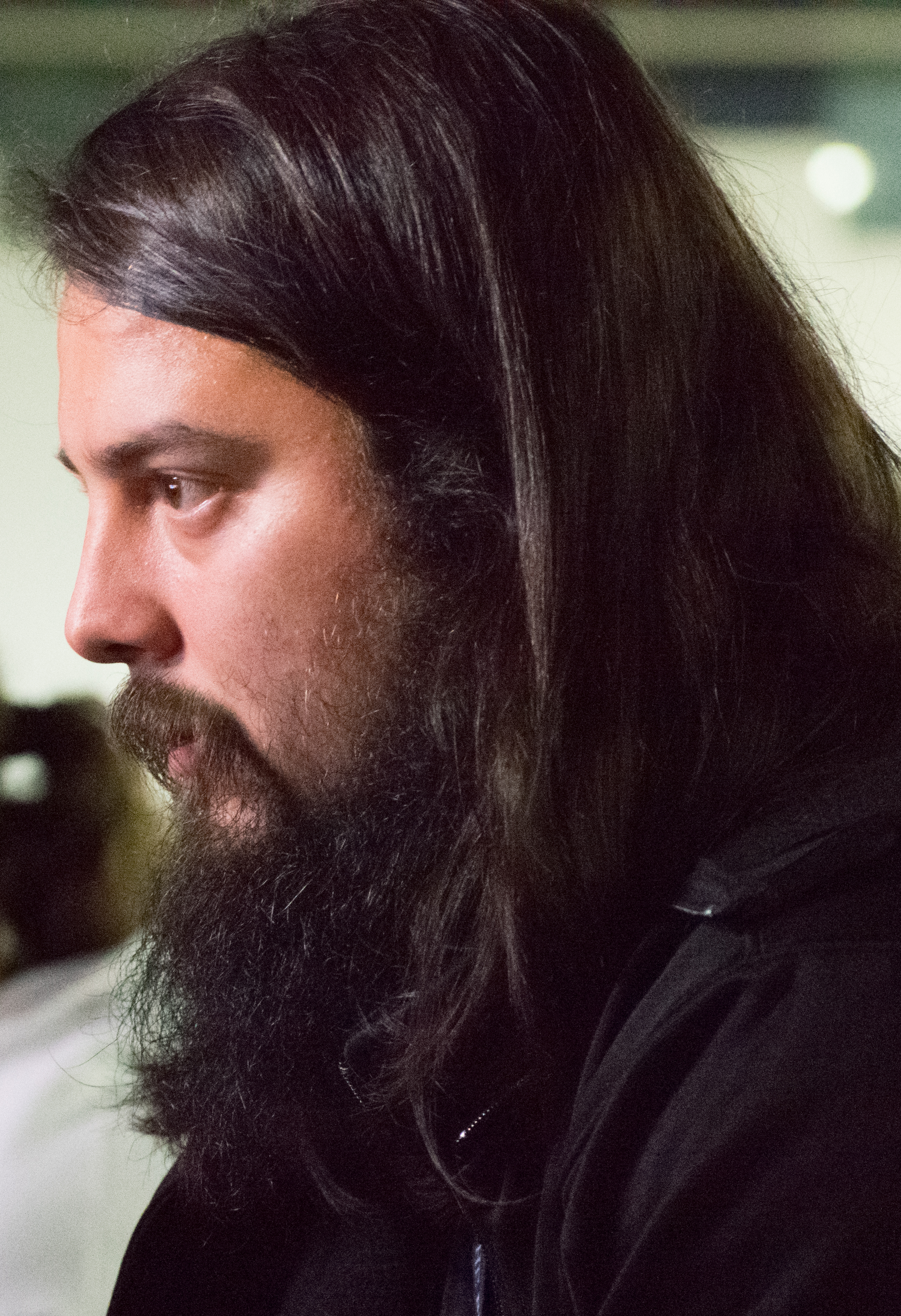
- Marquez in 2017

Personal information
- Name: Joseph Manuel Marquez
- Nickname(s): The Kid; The Goat; The Buster; Scorpion Master
- Born: December 10, 1991 (age 34); Norwalk, California, U.S.
- Nationality: American

Career information
- Games: Super Smash Bros. Melee; Project M
- Playing career: 2007–2025

Team history
- ????–2013: The Blade Breakers
- ????–2013: Roundbit
- 2013–2014: Melee It on Me
- 2014–2025: Cloud9

Career highlights and awards
- (36 majors won): 4× The Big House champion (2012, 2014, 2016, 2019); 3x Revival of Melee champion (2009, 2011, 2014); 3× Super Smash Con champion (2016, 2017, 2022); 2× Pound champion (2008, 2010); 2× Evolution Championship Series champion (2013, 2014); 2× Get On My Level champion (2014, 2019); 2x Smash Summit champion (2021, 2022); Genesis champion (2009); IMPULSE champion (2012); MELEE-FC10R Legacy champion (2012); Zenith 2013 champion; MLG champion (Anaheim 2014); Kings of Cali 4 champion (2014); Press Start champion (2015); Paragon Los Angeles champion (2015); DreamHack champion (2016); WTFox 2 champion (2016); Royal Flush champion (2017); Mango's Birthday Bash champion (2019); THE CLG MIXUP champion (2020); Ludwig Ahgren Championship Series 3 champion (2020); Lost Tech City champion (2022); Mainstage champion (2022); Tipped Off 15 champion (2024); Supernova champion (2024)

Twitch information
- Channel: mang0
- Followers: 496,000
- Last updated: July, 2026

Joseph Manuel Marquez (born December 10, 1991), known by his gamertag Mango (also stylized Mang0 or MaNg0), is an American professional Super Smash Bros. Melee player and streamer from Norwalk, California. Known for his aggressive, high-risk playstyle, he is widely considered one of the game's greatest players of all time, and one of the historical "Five Gods" of Melee, along with Adam "Armada" Lindgren, Jason "Mew2King" Zimmerman, Juan "Hungrybox" Debiedma and Kevin "PPMD" Nanney. Marquez began his career playing Jigglypuff; however, he has primarily played Falco and Fox since 2011, and is largely regarded as the best Falco player, and one of the best Fox players in Melee.

One of the most decorated Melee players in history, Marquez has won many major tournaments, including GENESIS 2009, EVO 2013 and 2014, The Big House in 2012, 2014, 2016, and 2019 and Smash Summit 11 in 2021. Marquez was ranked as one of the top ten Melee players in the world every year from 2013 to 2024 and was ranked the #1 Melee player in the world in 2013 and 2014. A 2021 list compiled by PGStats ranked Marquez as the greatest Melee player of all time. He is one of the most popular Melee players, with an active Twitch channel that boasts over 500,000 followers.

He was last part of the Cloud9 esports team, having joined in 2014. In June 2025, Marquez was seen on stream imitating sexual acts toward attendees while intoxicated during a livestreamed event, leading to his termination from Cloud9 and a temporary ban from Super Smash Bros. tournaments.

== Career ==
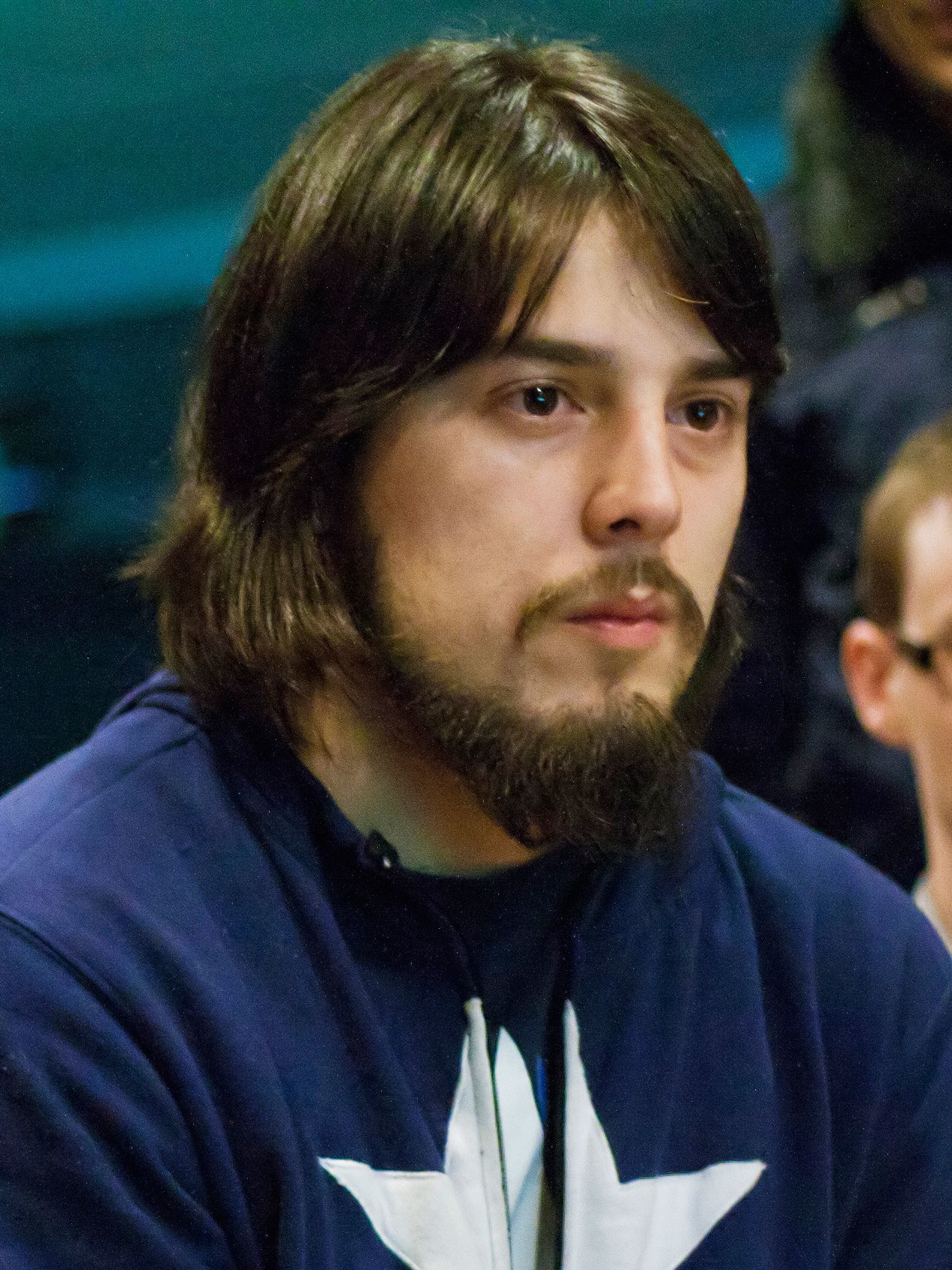
Marquez in 2014

Marquez began his career as a Jigglypuff player, citing Canadian Jigglypuff player The King as his inspiration. He contributed to the character's rise in the Melee's list of character viability known as the tier list. Marquez entered EVO 2007, beating players such as Mew2King. He finished 3rd after losing to Ken Hoang. He placed 3rd in Singles at Super Champ Combo. In doubles, he also placed 3rd with his partner Lucky, after beating the team of Ken and Isai.

Marquez's first national tournament win was Pound 3 in 2008.

On July 10, 2009, Marquez attended GENESIS, a tournament organized by San Francisco Melee crew DBR. With 290 entrants in Melee Singles, GENESIS was Melee's largest tournament at the time. Marquez reached the Winners' Finals and lost 2–3 against Adam "Armada" Lindgren, a Peach player regarded as the best player in Europe. Marquez reached Grand Finals to face Armada again and proceeded to win the tournament.

He claimed 1st place at Pound 4, then the largest tournament in Melee history with over 300 entrants, defeating Hungrybox in Grand Finals.

After being banned on Smash World Forums, Marquez, along with DBR and some buddies from his region, decided to prank the rest of the Smash community by creating an alias known as ScorpionMaster94 and sandbag at a number of tournaments using Mario.

In 2011, Marquez entered GENESIS 2 and reached Grand Finals against Armada. After a close and intense set, Marquez ultimately placed 2nd, losing 2–3.

Marquez secured his position as the champion of North America by winning Revival of Melee 4, convincingly defeating Dr. PeePee 3–0 in Winners' Finals and 3–1 in Grand Finals.

At Apex 2012, Marquez placed 3rd after losing 1–3 to Hungrybox in Losers' Finals. After Apex 2012, Marquez began to regain the dominant lead he held back in 2008. He won IMPULSE, a Canadian national tournament, after defeating Dr. PeePee, Hungrybox, and Mew2King. Marquez continued to defend his victory streak, convincingly defeating Hungrybox in Grand Finals at MELEE-FC10R Legacy and again at The Big House 2. At Apex 2013, Marquez lost to Mew2King, placing 4th.

=== EVO 2013 ===
At B.E.A.S.T 3 in Sweden, Marquez won the tournament after defeating Ice in Grand Finals. He also won Kings of Cali 2, defeating Wobbles 3–0 in Grand Finals.

At NorCal Regionals 2013, Marquez reached Grand Finals after defeating Fly Amanita, Westballz, and PewPewU in the Losers' Bracket and won a convincing 3–0 first set against Hungrybox, but failed to pull through in the second set, losing 2–3. At Vindication, Marquez lost the first set of Grand Finals 1–3. However, he managed to win the second set 3–1, winning the tournament.

At Zenith 2013, Marquez reached Grand Finals and won the tournament after defeating Hungrybox in 2 sets, both 3–1.

At IMPULSE 2013 in Toronto, Marquez claimed 1st place without dropping a game, defeating Unknown522 3–0 in both Winners' and Grand Finals. Teaming with Unknown522, Marquez also took 1st in Melee Doubles and 1st in Project M Singles.

With 709 entrants, EVO 2013 was the seventh largest Super Smash Bros. Melee tournament at the time. With his victory at Zenith 2013, Marquez reached the Grand Finals and defeated Wobbles in 2 sets, 3-0 and 3–1 to become the champion. Following his EVO victory, he was considered to be the best player in the game. After winning EVO 2013 and with the birth of his son, Marquez announced that he would be taking a small hiatus from competitive Melee. In 2013, Marquez became less active in gaming, choosing to spend more time with his family. During this period he entered tournaments primarily with secondary characters, including placing 2nd at LANHAMMER 2013 with Marth and 2nd at Pound V.5 with Marth and Captain Falcon.

At Fight Pitt 3, Marquez lost to Mew2King in Grand Finals.

By the end of 2013, the Melee It on Me (MIOM) 2013 SSBMRank placed Marquez as the best player of that year.

=== 2014 ===
==== Cloud9 and MLG Anaheim 2014 ====
Revival of Melee 7 marked Marquez's return to competitive Melee. Marquez won the tournament without dropping a set. At Fight Pitt IV, Marquez defeated Mew2King in Grand Finals.

At WHOBO MLG, Marquez defeated Hax in two sets of Grand Finals 6–0 using Falco to win the tournament and qualify for MLG Anaheim 2014.

On May 6, 2014, Cloud9 HyperX announced that they had signed Marquez to lead their fighting games division. Marquez entered Get On My Level 2014 in Toronto, where he took 1st place, beating Hungrybox 3–2 in Grand Finals.

MLG Anaheim 2014 had one of the largest prize pools in Smash history at US$15,000 and was the first Major League Gaming sponsored Melee tournament since 2006. Marquez defeated PPMD in Winners' Semifinals 3–2. He beat Armada in Winners' Finals and again in Grand Finals, both sets 3–2, to claim 1st place.

Marquez later attended CEO 2014, where he managed to reach Grand Finals, but lost to Armada. At Kings of Cali 4, Marquez reached Winners' Finals, where he faced off against Armada. He lost the first set of Grand Finals 0–3, but won the second set 3–1, placing 1st in Singles.

At the end of the year Melee It on Me ranked Marquez as the best Melee player in the world in the 2014 SSBMRank.

==== EVO 2014 ====
EVO 2014 had a total of 970 entrants for Melee, surpassing the record set by EVO 2013 and becoming the largest Smash tournament at the time. Marquez defeated Mew2King 2–0, and Hungrybox 3–2 in both Winners' Finals and Grand Finals, to take 1st place.

==== Post–EVO 2014 ====
After winning EVO 2014, Marquez attended Smash the Record, choosing to play only as Captain Falcon. In Winners' Finals he lost to Hungrybox and was then eliminated from the tournament by Mew2King, finishing his run at 3rd place.

Afterward, Marquez attended The Shape of Melee to Come 5 in Kirtland, Ohio. In Losers' Finals, Marquez lost to Armada, placing 2nd.

At The Big House 4 in Romulus, Michigan, Marquez beat Mew2King 3–1 in Grand Finals, but had to win another set since he came from the Losers' Bracket. He beat Mew2King 3–1 once more to win the tournament. He placed 9th in doubles, teaming with Captain Falcon player Scar.

At Do You Fox Wit It?, Marquez only entered Doubles with Lucky and the team took 2nd place, losing to Hax and Mew2King in Grand Finals.

=== 2015 ===
Marquez attended B.E.A.S.T. 5 in Gothenburg, Sweden and defeated Armada's younger brother, Android, a Sheik player, and Germany's best player, Ice, before losing 2–3 to Leffen in Winners' Finals. In Losers' Finals, Marquez lost 0–3 to Armada, finishing 3rd place.

==== Apex 2015 ====
At Apex 2015, Leffen defeated Marquez's Falco with Fox. Then Marquez lost to Armada 0–3 in Losers' Semifinals, netting 4th place.

==== Spring and Summer ====
At I'm Not Yelling! in Oakland, California, Marquez lost to Armada, giving Marquez a 2nd-place finish. At MVG Sandstorm in Tempe, Arizona, Marquez was knocked out by Westballz at 5th place at the tournament.

At Press Start in Irvine, California, Marquez reached Grand Finals and beat Ice Climbers player Fly Amanita to place 1st.

At Battle Arena Melbourne 7 in Melbourne, Australia, Marquez placed 1st by defeating S2J in Winners' Semifinals, Leffen in Winners' Finals, and then Leffen again in Grand Finals.

At CEO 2015 in Orlando, Florida, Marquez was eliminated by Armada, placing 3rd in the tournament. At WTFox in Memphis, Tennessee, Marquez reached Grand Finals, but was defeated by Leffen 3–0.

==== EVO 2015 ====
With 1,869 entrants, EVO 2015 became the biggest Melee tournament of all time. Marquez reached top 8 for the fourth straight time. In Losers' top 8, In Losers' Quarterfinals, Marquez lost to Hungrybox, 1–2, ending his EVO 2015 run with a 5th place tie with Leffen. Marquez also teamed with Lucky and placed 9th in Doubles.

After EVO 2015, MIOM ranked Marquez 3rd in its 2015 Summer SSBMRank.

==== Post EVO 2015 ====
Marquez's first tournament after EVO 2015 was Paragon Los Angeles 2015 on September 5 and 6. He beat Mew2King 3–2 in Grand Finals to take 1st place. Marquez attended HTC Throwdown in San Francisco, California and lost to Drugged Fox for the first time 1–2. Then, in his first set in Losers', he lost to MacD 1–2, ending his HTC tournament run at 17th place.

At The Big House 5 in Dearborn, Michigan, the Melee events started off with a 5 v 5 crew battle, with Marquez representing SoCal (Southern California). In the Final matchup against Ice, Marquez lead SoCal to the crew battle victory. In Doubles, Marquez teamed with friend and Fox player Alex19, but were knocked out in the Phase 1 pools. In Singles, Marquez lost to Hungrybox 1–3 in Winners' Semifinals. In Losers' Top 8, Marquez lost to Mew2King 0–3 to end at 4th place.

Later Beyond the Summit, a company known for its Dota 2 coverage, invited Marquez to participate in Smash Summit in Los Angeles. There, his crew, Team Alex19, lost to Team Kage 15–16. In Doubles, Marquez teamed with Lucky. The duo lost to PewPewU and SFAT 1–2. In Losers' Finals, they lost to Armada and Mew2King 0–3. In Singles, in Winners' he reached Grand Finals against Armada. In a very close set, Armada beat Marquez 3–2, giving Marquez a 2nd-place finish.

On October 9, 2015, Armada announced that Marquez will be attending DreamHack Winter 2015 in Jönköping, Sweden through Twitter. He was upset by Westballz 0–3 in Losers' Quarterfinals, giving him a 5th-place finish, tied with Samus player Duck.

In the final 2015 Rankings, Marquez was ranked 4th, his lowest placing since MIOM started the SSBMRank, by a group of 43 professional players and active people in the Smash scene.

=== 2016–2018 ===
The first national of the year, GENESIS 3, in San Jose, California, had 1,836 entrants, including Marquez. He was drafted by Scar, along with Alex19, Samus player Duck, and Fox player Colbol. The team faced Team PewPewU in the first round and lost. In Doubles, Marquez failed to show up with his partner S2J, so the duo was immediately disqualified from the tournament. In Singles, he lost the Grand Finals to Armada.

Marquez then signed up for PAX Arena in San Antonio, Texas. He lost to Hungrybox in Grand Finals, 2–3.

Marquez was invited to SXSW's Battle of the Five Gods, which featured twenty players: Marquez, Armada, Mew2King, PPMD, Hungrybox, MacD, Ice, Silent Wolf, DruggedFox, HugS, Westballz, Nintendude, Plup, SFAT, PewPewU, Shroomed, Axe, Lucky, Wobbles, and S2J. He beat Hungrybox 3–0 in the first set of Grand Finals, but then Hungrybox brought it back the second set 1–3, netting Marquez a 2nd place.

Marquez also attended Pound 6 (April 2–3), where he ended up in Winners' Bracket for top 8. He went to Grand Finals, finishing 2nd place after a 1–3 loss to Hungrybox in the first set of Grand Finals.

Marquez was invited to Smash Summit 2. In crew battles, Marquez's team lost to Team Armada and then to Team Hungrybox in Losers' to net a 3rd-place finish. In the Iron Man competition, Marquez went on to face Armada in Grand Finals and used Mario to take 5 stocks from Armada, winning the Iron Man 20–19. In Doubles, with S2J, the duo lost to Hungrybox and Plup 0–3 in Losers' Finals. In Singles, Marquez lost to Armada 0–3, placing 4th at the tournament. Marquez attended The Big House 6, a national tournament held annually in Michigan in fall. He won 1st place after advancing to Grand Finals on the winning side, and reset the Bracket to defeat Armada in Game 5 of the second set. Marquez also won Royal Flush, a major tournament held in Atlantic City in May 2017, ending Armada's dominant streak which began at the end of 2017 and winning his fourth consecutive tournament held on Mother's Day weekend.

=== 2019–present ===
In 2019 Marquez won The Big House 9, in 2020 he won LACS 3, in 2021 Smash Summit 11 and in 2022 he won Super Smash Con 2022, Lost Tech City 2022, Smash Summit 14 and Mainstage 2022. In 2024, Marquez won Tipped Off 15 and Supernova 2024.

On June 21, 2025, Marquez attended the Beerio Kart World Cup, a Mario Kart World tournament held by Ludwig Ahgren. During the event, he was caught on camera drunkenly harassing several of the tournament's attendees with inappropriate physical actions. Marquez acknowledged the situation on Twitter and stated that he would apologize privately to those that he affected, re-evaluate his relationship with alcohol, and accept any consequences for his actions. On June 23, Cloud9 released Marquez due to the incident. On June 25, 2025 the organisers of Supernova, one of the biggest tournaments on the Super Smash Bros. scene, announced that Marquez would not be permitted to attend the 2025 edition of the event due to his conduct. The same day, Marquez's Twitch account was banned, although he was unbanned after one week. On 1 July, 2026, he stated on social media that he was one year sober.

== Personal life ==
Marquez is of Costa Rican descent. He graduated from John Glenn High School in 2010. He and his significant other Lauren have one son, Joseph Mango Marquez, born October 14, 2013, whose middle name comes from the senior Marquez's Melee handle. Marquez stated that his involvement in gaming kept him out of gangs. Marquez was accused of domestic violence and adultery in 2016 by his wife Lauren, which Marquez and his mother repeatedly denied. Marquez currently lives in Norwalk, California. He lived in Ohio after winning EVO 2013 but has since returned to his hometown.

Marquez's early Melee career is featured in an episode of the 2013 documentary series The Smash Brothers.

== Awards and nominations ==
| Ceremony | Year | Category | Result | Ref. |
|---|---|---|---|---|
| The Streamer Awards | 2021 | Best Super Smash Bros. Streamer | Won | |
