= Genesis (tournament) =

Series of Super Smash Bros. tournaments

- GENESIS 6 logo

Tournament information
- Game: Super Smash Bros.
- Location: San Francisco Bay Area
- Established: 2009
- Number of tournaments: 12

Current champion
- Melee: Cody Schwab; Ultimate: Sonix; Smash 64: Isai; Brawl: Chia

Final champion
- Project M: Kage (GENESIS 2); Wii U: MKLeo (GENESIS 5)

Genesis, stylized as GENESIS, is a series of annual Super Smash Bros. tournaments occurring in the San Francisco Bay Area of the US state of California. The first Genesis tournament took place in 2009 in Antioch at the Contra Costa County Fairgrounds.

Since 2024, the Classic Tetris World Championship hosts their CTWC Genesis Regional concurrently at the same venue.

== History ==
=== 2009–2011 ===
The first iteration, GENESIS, took place in Antioch, California, beginning on July 10, 2009. The tournament was organized by Boback Vakili and the Concord-based DBR crew. At the time, it was the largest Melee tournament in history and the fifth largest Brawl tournament. The tournament featured players from around the world, including the US, Sweden, Canada, Mexico, and Puerto Rico. Melee singles was won by Joseph "Mango" Marquez. This would mark Adam "Armada" Lindgren's first time playing in the United States and is considered the beginning of his rivalry with Mango. Melee doubles was won by the duo of Jason "Mew2King" Zimmerman and Jman, Brawl singles was won by Ally, and Brawl doubles was won by Mew2King and Fiction.

GENESIS 2 was held two years later from July 15–17, 2011. It was once again hosted by Vakili and DBR in Antioch. This tournament added brackets for the original Super Smash Bros. and Project M, in addition to Melee and Brawl. It was sponsored by Red Bull and SABERGAMING. Melee singles was won by Armada in a rematch against Mango in Grand Finals, and doubles was won by Mango and Jose "Lucky" Angel Aldama. Brawl singles was won by Mew2King over Elliot "Ally" Bastien Carroza Oyarce, who won the doubles bracket together. Smash 64 singles was won by Canadian player Daniel "SuPeRbOoMfAn" Hoyt and Project M singles was won by Roustane "Kage" Benzeguir.

Genesis 2 was subject to a theft scandal that took place on its final day. DBR member Robert "Zelgadis" Scherer stole prize money that was accidentally left in a hotel room. When accused, he denied doing so, although he confessed and returned the money after police involvement. This incident damaged the reputations of Zelgadis, DBR, GENESIS, and the Smash community as a whole.

=== 2016–present ===
A third tournament was not announced until 2013, but it was cancelled because of scheduling conflicts with other tournaments, particularly Apex in New Jersey. In August 2015, GENESIS 3 was announced and took place from January 15–18, 2016, in San Jose at the San Jose Convention Center and City National Civic Amphitheater. The tournament was sponsored by Nintendo. Tournament organizers initially planned to allow top ranked players to automatically advance to the top bracket, but reversed this decision after backlash from social media and community figures. Eventually, organizers decided to float the Melee players to the second round, but made the Smash 4 players play in the first round. Armada once again took Melee singles over Mango. Wii U singles was won by Gonzalo "ZeRo" Barrios over Samuel "Dabuz" Buzby. Smash 64 singles was won by Japanese player wario, who attended the tournament through a crowd fund. A $500 "Bobby Scar Award" was given to fifth place, which was also the result of a fundraiser. It was named after the player and commentator Bobby "Scar" Scarnewman, who made a notable run at the first Genesis, placing sixth. It was awarded to Zachary "SFAT" Cordoni. He would have played a tiebreaker match with Kevin "PPMD" Nanney, but the latter forfeited, saying that he didn't have motivation to play any more. In crew battles, Juan "Hungrybox" DeBiedma's team won the draft crew battles and Japan beat Southern California to take the regional crew battles. In the fourth installment of the Melee Games, a collegiate bracket, UC Irvine took the title over Georgia Tech. A documentary about the Smash 64 scene called The 64 Story: Genesis 3 was shot at G3.

GENESIS 4 took place from January 20–22, 2017, in San Jose, using the same venues as Genesis 3. Nintendo was once again a sponsor of the tournament, along with HTC, Nvidia, Controller Chaos, Twitch, Red Bull, and others. Once more, tournament organizers announced that the top 64 ranked Melee players at the event would automatically begin in the second round of the tournament, sparking backlash from top players such as William "Leffen" Hjelte and Armada. For the fourth time, Armada and Mango played in the Grand Finals of Melee singles, with Armada coming out on the top for his third Genesis title. Mango's Losers Quarterfinals set against Leffen is considered in the community to be one of the best ever played. Earlier in the tournament, Armada nearly lost to Johnny "S2J" Kim, which would have made S2J the first player outside of the "Five Gods" (a title used to refer to a particular group of dominant players, including Armada) and Leffen to defeat Armada in a tournament set since Pound 4 in 2010. In Wii U singles, Mexican player Leonardo "MkLeo" Pérez won over Ally. Peruvian player Alvin Clay Leon Haro defeated SuPeRbOoMfAn in Smash 64 singles. Team Silent Wolf defeated Team Hungrybox in Melee Draft Crews, and Team USA defeated Team Japan in Wii U World Crews. Melee doubles was won by brothers Armada and Android over Leffen and Ice. Wii U doubles was won by Ally and MkLeo over the Japanese duo Ranai and Komorikiri. Smash 64 doubles was won by defending champions JaimeHR and SuPeRbOoMfAn over last year's runners-up tacos and The Z. This was the first tournament in the series to feature games not in the Super Smash Bros. franchise, those being Street Fighter V, Catherine, Rivals of Aether, and TowerFall Ascension.

Genesis 4 was subject to a controversial anomaly which was discovered after the Wii U match between Rei “Komorikiri” Furukawa and Zack "Captain Zack" Lauth. The in-game "launch rate," which modifies the distance attacks will send the opponent, was supposed to be set to the default of 1.0 for all tournament matches. At the end of Komorikiri and Captain Zack's match, it was discovered to have been set to 0.9 for the entire set. Testing proved that this was also the case during the previous set between ZeRo and Dabuz. Despite this, the tournament organizers decided that instead of replaying the whole set, a single game would be played to decide the winner of that set, which triggered criticism from viewers and members of the community alike.

GENESIS 5 was announced on July 16, 2017, and held from January 19–21, 2018. After the last two events in San Jose, the tournament organizers moved Genesis 5 to Oakland, and the event was held at the Oakland Convention Center. Sunday matches were held in the Paramount Theatre. Justin "Plup" McGrath won Melee singles over Hungrybox, making him the second player to defeat all of the Five Gods and win a premiere tournament. In addition, Hugo "HugS" Gonzalez became the first Samus main to place in the top 8 at a premiere tournament. This was the first Genesis tournament not to feature Armada and Mango in the Grand Finals, with Armada placing fourth and Mango placing fifth. In Wii U singles, MkLeo defeated the dark horse Tamim "Mistake" Omary to defend his Genesis title. SuPeRbOoMfAn won Smash 64 singles over the defending champion Alvin in a close Grand Finals set. Alvin did take Smash 64 doubles along with his partner Eduardo "tacos" Tovar. Melee doubles was won by Plup and Mew2King, and Wii U doubles was won by MkLeo and Javier "Javi" Balderas Perez. This tournament also featured Rivals of Aether, Splatoon 2, Marvel vs. Capcom: Infinite, Street Fighter V, Pokkén Tournament DX, and Dance Dance Revolution Extreme.

GENESIS 6 took place from February 1–3, 2019, in Oakland. Pools took place at the Oakland Convention Center and top eight took place at the Paramount Theatre. For the first time in Genesis history, Melee was not the featured event due to the newly released Super Smash Bros. Ultimate's popularity. As Armada had retired from Melee in 2018, his rivalry with Mango had come to an end. Leffen also didn't participate in Melee singles, choosing to focus on Ultimate. Many saw Mango and Plup as the favorites to face Hungrybox in Grand Finals. Mango was upset in pools against the 97th ranked Sasha "Magi" Sullivan, but managed to progress through the loser's bracket before falling to Japanese player Masaya "aMSa" Chikamoto at fifth. Jeffrey "Axe" Williamson beat both Plup and aMSa in the loser's bracket and made it to Grand Finals, the first time he, or any Pikachu main, had done so at a premiere-level tournament. Hungrybox beat him after a close set, earning his first Genesis title. Genesis 6 was the first premiere-level tournament for Ultimate, and the top two seeded players, Gavin "Tweek" Dempsey and Nairoby "Nairo" Quezada, were upset in the top 64 bracket and failed to qualify for the top eight. The Grand Finals featured the eighth seeded VoiD against the third seeded MkLeo, which MkLeo won for his third Genesis title. K y s k won Smash 64 singles over Josh Brody in a five-game set. K y s k would also go on to win the doubles event with his partner Prince. SFAT and Kevin "PewPewU" Toy won Melee doubles, and Rasheen "Dark Wizzy" Rose and Saleem "Salem" Akiel Young won Ultimate doubles. The tournament also featured Rivals of Aether, Splatoon 2, Slap City, Magical Drop III, Dance Dance Revolution Extreme, and Windjammers.

GENESIS 7 took place in Oakland, California on January 24–26, 2020. Marth player Zain Naghmi, who was sponsored by Twitch streamer Ludwig Ahgren to wear his Mogul Moves line of clothing while competing at the event, won Melee singles without dropping a single set. Zain defeated top-seeded Hungrybox in Grand Finals. In a similar fashion, Tyler "Marss" Martin won Ultimate singles without dropping a set, defeating top-seeded MkLeo in Grand Finals.

GENESIS 8 took place in San Jose, California from April 15 to April 17, 2022. Zain won the Melee singles bracket for the second year in a row, facing Jake "Jmook" DiRado in Grand Finals. Jmook's run included upset wins over several notable players, including Plup, lloD, and n0ne. MkLeo won the Ultimate singles bracket over French player William "Glutonny" Belaïd. Glutonny's run was also notable, coming out over the second seed Sparg0 in Losers Finals.

GENESIS 9 took place in San Jose, California from January 20-22, 2023. Jmook won the Melee singles bracket over Cody Schwab in the finals, representing his first ever major victory. He notably did not drop a set during the tournament, winning through the winners bracket. MkLeo won the Ultimate singles bracket over MuteAce. Other notable performances included 2saint's 7th place finish, which included upsets over 1st seed aMSa, Canadian player Soonsay, and rank 12 player Kodorin.

GENESIS 10 (stylized as GENESIS X) took place in San Jose, California from February 16-18, 2024. Cody Schwab - the #1 ranked player as of SSBMRank 2023 - won the Melee singles bracket over aMSa (the best Yoshi player in the world, ranked 6th overall), becoming the 4th Melee player to ever win a Big House and a Genesis. The #2 player, Zain, lost twice to aMSa in the round of 16 and again in the losers' final to take 3rd.

Genesis X's Ultimate bracket was large enough at 1506 entrants to be considered a supermajor, and was the second tournament of 2024 to be considered "Premier-tier" by LumiRank. It was won by R.O.B. player Zomba, ranked 15th in the world at the time, with him defeating notable players such as Sparg0 (ranked 2nd), Glutonny (ranked 5th), and Tweek (ranked 7th), before double eliminating Sonix (ranked 3rd) to take the tournament. Another notable placing was that of MkLeo, who placed 25th, as this was the first Genesis tournament that he entered and did not place either first or second.
