= Apex (tournament) =

Annual esports competition in New Jersey

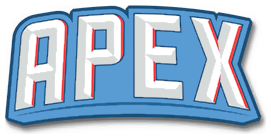
- Game: Super Smash Bros.
- Founded: 2009
- Founder: Johnathan Lugo (resigned)
- General manager: Andre "Bifuteki" Augustin
- Country: United States
- Most recent champions: SSBM: Masaya "aMSa" Chikamoto; SSBWU: reflection; SSB64: KD3; SSBB: Cody “Cody” William; PM: Adam "Armada" Lindgren (discontinued after 2014)
- Most titles: Adam "Armada" Lindgren (3 titles) (SSBM: 2012, 2013) (PM: 2014)
- Website: Apex

Apex is an annual esports tournament held in New Jersey that is focused on Super Smash Bros. The event's first incarnation was in 2009 with Jesus "Jman" Fernandez as the champion of Super Smash Bros. Melee and Elliot "Ally" Carroza-Oyarce as champion of Super Smash Bros. Brawl. Each year the event grew with more competitors entering. Apex 2014 garnered 629 entrants and was the 2nd largest tournament for Melee at the time after EVO 2013. Though the tournament initially focused on Brawl, the feature game has since switched to Melee due to its popularity. In 2010, an event for Super Smash Bros. for the Nintendo 64 was added. In 2014, the fan modification of Brawl, Project M was added for singles only. Project M has recently been removed as an official event out copyright concerns under Nintendo of America sponsorship and Third Party relations.

Apex 2015 was officially sponsored by Nintendo of America and was the largest tournament for Super Smash Bros. in history until it was surpassed by EVO 2015. Apex has been described as the "Super Bowl of 'Super Smash Bros.'" by Ben Lindbergh of sports website Grantland.

== History ==
Apex was founded in 2009 by Johnathan Lugo, known by his alias "Alex Strife", as a Super Smash Bros. tournament. The tournament also hosts side events which include fighting games such as Street Fighter, Marvel vs. Capcom, Tekken, and others.

== 2009 ==
Apex 2009 was hosted at the Clarion Hotel Palmer Inn in Princeton, New Jersey. The tournament featured Super Smash Bros. Brawl, Melee, and Brawl+. Melee singles was won by Jman and doubles was won by Mew2King and Jman. Brawl singles was won by Ally and doubles was won by Ally and Mew2King. Brawl+ singles was won by ChuDat. In Brawl crews, MD/VA won.

Super Smash Bros. Melee Singles (52 entrants)
Place	Player	Alias	Character(s)
1st	(United States) Jesus Fernandez	Jman	Fox
2nd	(United States) Jason Zimmerman	Mew2King	Marth, Sheik, Fox
3rd	(United States) Daniel Rodriguez	ChuDat	Ice Climbers
4th	(United States) Aziz Al-Yami	Hax	Captain Falcon
5th	(Canada) Roustane Benzeguir	Kage	Ganondorf
5th	(United States) Charles Meighen	Cactuar	Fox
7th	(United States) Bobby Scarnewman	Scar	Captain Falcon
7th	(United States)	Hazz	Fox

Super Smash Bros. Brawl Singles (210 entrants)
Place	Player	Alias	Character(s)
1st	(Canada) Elliot Carroza-Oyarce	Ally	Snake
2nd	(United States) Jason Zimmerman	Mew2King	Meta Knight
3rd	(United States)	lain	Ice Climbers
4th	(United States) Jason Bates	Anti	Meta Knight
5th	(United States) Trevor Hirschen	Atomsk	King Dedede
5th	(United States) Kelvin Quezada	Ksizzle	Meta Knight
7th	(United States) Wyatt Beekman	ADHD	Diddy Kong
7th	(United States) Antoine Sledge	Anther	Pikachu

== 2010 ==
Apex 2010 was hosted in New Brunswick, New Jersey at Rutgers University–New Brunswick's College Avenue Student Center. It featured Melee, Brawl, and Super Smash Bros. 64. It also featured the Brawl mods Brawl+ and Brawl-.

Super Smash Bros. Melee Singles (220 entrants)
Place	Player	Alias	Character(s)
1st	(United States) Juan Debiedma	Hungrybox	Jigglypuff
2nd	(Sweden) Adam Lindgren	Armada	Peach
3rd	(United States) Jason Zimmerman	Mew2King	Sheik, Marth, Fox
4th	(United States) Kevin Nanney	Dr. PeePee	Falco
5th	(United States) Jeffrey Williamson	Axe	Pikachu
5th	(United States) Robert Wright	Wobbles	Ice Climbers
7th	(United States) Jesus Fernandez	Jman	Fox
7th	(United States) Julian Zhu	Zhu	Falco

Super Smash Bros. Brawl Singles (269 entrants)
Place	Player	Alias	Character(s)
1st	(United States) Larry Holland	DEHF	Falco
2nd	(Japan)	Brood	Olimar
3rd	(United States) Jason Zimmerman	Mew2King	Meta Knight
4th	(United States) Lee Martin	Lee Martin	Lucario, Meta Knight
5th	(Canada) Elliot Carroza-Oyarce	Ally	Snake
5th	(United States)	lain	Ice Climbers
7th	(Japan) Tetsuhisa Kosaka	RAIN	Falco, Meta Knight
7th	(United States) Trevor Hirschen	Atomsk	King Dedede, Ice Climbers, Wario

Super Smash Bros. Singles (22 entrants)
Place	Player	Alias	Character(s)
1st	(United States) Will Engel	Sensei	Fox
2nd	(United States) Michael Brancato	Nintendude	Captain Falcon
3rd	(United States) Joe Franks	m3gav01t	Captain Falcon
4th	(United States) Jerry Liu	valoem	Pikachu

== 2012 ==
After a one-year hiatus, Apex 2012 returned to New Brunswick, New Jersey at Rutgers University's College Avenue Student Center. It featured Melee, Brawl, and 64. Melee Singles was won by Armada and doubles by Armada and Mew2King. Brawl was won by Otori in singles and Otori and Kakera in doubles. Smash 64 was won by SuPeRbOoMfAn and doubles was won by Isai and Nintendude. In Melee USA v the World, USA won by a massive 8 stocks. Brawl was set to have a crew battle, but it was cancelled due to time constraints. The tournament was criticized because Brawl did not have enough setups, causing delay in pool matches and necessitating the cancellation of the crew battle.

Super Smash Bros. Melee Singles (318 entrants)
Place	Player	Alias	Character(s)
1st	(Sweden) Adam Lindgren	Armada	Peach, Young Link
2nd	(United States) Juan Debiedma	Hungrybox	Jigglypuff
3rd	(United States) Joseph Marquez	Mango	Falco, Fox
4th	(Mexico) Javier Ruiz	Javi	Fox
5th	(United States) Kevin Nanney	Dr. PeePee	Falco
5th	(Canada) David MacDonald	KirbyKaze	Sheik
7th	(United States) Aziz Al-Yami	Hax	Captain Falcon
7th	(United States) DaJuan McDaniel	Shroomed	Dr. Mario

Super Smash Bros. Brawl Singles (400 entrants)
Place	Player	Alias	Character(s)
1st	(Japan) Ishikawa Kenta	Otori	Meta Knight
2nd	(Japan) Yuta Uejima	Nietono	Olimar
3rd	(United States) Nairoby Quezada	Nairo	Meta Knight
4th	(United States) Eric Lew	ESAM	Ice Climbers, Pikachu
5th	(Canada) Elliot Carroza-Oyarce	Ally	Snake
5th	(Japan) Ishikawa Shota	Kakera	Meta Knight
7th	(United States) Timothy Campos	UltimateRazer	Snake
7th	(United States) Wyatt Beekman	ADHD	Diddy Kong

Super Smash Bros. Singles (64 entrants)
Place	Player	Alias	Character(s)
1st	(Canada) Daniel Hoyt	SuPeRbOoMfAn	Captain Falcon, Fox
2nd	(United States) Isai Alvarado	Isai	Link
3rd	(Mexico) Jaime Rodriguez	JaimeHR	Captain Falcon, Fox, Samus
4th	(United States)	Kefit	Pikachu
5th	(United States) Michael Brancato	Nintendude	Pikachu, Mario
5th	(United States) Will Engel	Sensei	Pikachu, Fox
7th	(United States) Joe Franks	m3gav01t	Captain Falcon
7th	(Denmark) Julius Vissing	King Funk	Captain Falcon

== 2013 ==
Apex 2013 was again hosted in the College Avenue Student Center at Rutgers University featuring Melee, Brawl, and 64. It also featured USA v The World crew battles for both Melee and Brawl. In addition, Melee had The Links v The Stinks crew battle, in which a team of seven Links challenged team of six well known low tier mains and were joined by "The Final Boss," Kage, to a crew battle.

Super Smash Bros. Melee Singles (336 entrants)
Place	Player	Alias	Character(s)
1st	(Sweden) Adam Lindgren	Armada	Peach, Young Link
2nd	(United States) Kevin Nanney	Dr. PeePee	Falco, Marth
3rd	(United States) Jason Zimmerman	CT.EMP|Mew2King	Marth, Sheik
4th	(United States) Joseph Marquez	Mango	Fox, Falco
5th	(United States) Juan Debiedma	Hungrybox	Jigglypuff
5th	(United States) DaJuan McDaniel	Shroomed	Dr. Mario
7th	(United States) Aziz Al-Yami	Hax	Captain Falcon
7th	(Canada) David MacDonald	KirbyKaze	Sheik

Super Smash Bros. Brawl Singles (338 entrants)
Place	Player	Alias	Character(s)
1st	(United States) Saleem Young	Salem	Zero Suit Samus
2nd	(United States) Jason Zimmerman	CT.EMP|Mew2King	Meta Knight
3rd	(Japan) Ishikawa Kenta	Otori	Meta Knight
4th	(United States) Nairoby Quezada	Nairo	Meta Knight
5th	(United States) Jason Bates	Anti	Meta Knight
5th	(Japan) Takeshi Gomota	Mikeneko	Marth
7th	(United States) Samuel Buzby	Dabuz	Olimar
7th	(Netherlands) Ramin Delshad	Mr. R	Marth

Super Smash Bros. Singles (96 entrants)
Place	Player	Alias	Character(s)
1st	(Japan) Nico Watanabe	Kikoushi	Kirby
2nd	(United States) Isai Alvarado	Isai	Mario
3rd	(Canada) Daniel Hoyt	SuPeRbOoMfAn	Captain Falcon, Fox, Pikachu
4th	(Japan) Akio Tamowo	Ruoka Dancho	Captain Falcon, Luigi
5th	(Mexico) Jaime Rodriguez	JaimeHR	Captain Falcon, Fox
6th	(United States) Hugo Morgan	Sensei	Pikachu, Fox, Captain Falcon
7th	(United States) Dennis Keith	Kefit	Pikachu
8th	(Japan)	Nangoku	Ness

== 2014 ==
Apex 2014 was hosted at the DoubleTree hotel in Somerset, New Jersey featuring Melee, Project M, Brawl, and 64.

Super Smash Bros. Melee Singles (629 entrants)
Place	Player	Alias	Character(s)
1st	(United States) Kevin Nanney	VGBC|Dr. PeePee	Falco, Marth
2nd	(United States) Jason Zimmerman	CT.EMP|Mew2King	Sheik, Marth, Fox
3rd	(United States) Joseph Marquez	MIOM|Mango	Falco, Fox
4th	(Sweden) William Hjelte	Leffen	Fox
5th	(United States) Juan Debiedma	CT|Hungrybox	Jigglypuff
5th	(United States) Colin Green	Colbol	Fox
7th	(United States) Joshua Davis	SS|s0ft	Jigglypuff
7th	(United States) Shephard Lima	Fiction	Fox

Super Smash Bros. Brawl Singles (370 entrants)
Place	Player	Alias	Character(s)
1st	(United States) Nairoby Quezada	Nairo	Meta Knight
2nd	(Chile) Gonzalo Barrios	CT|ZeRo	Meta Knight
3rd	(United States) Eric Lew	ESAM	Pikachu, Ice Climbers
4th	(United States) Jason Zimmerman	CT.EMP|Mew2King	Meta Knight
5th	(Canada) Elliot Carroza-Oyarce	Ally	Meta Knight, Snake
5th	(United States) Wyatt Beekman	ADHD	Diddy Kong
7th	(United States) Eric Legesse	Tyrant	Meta Knight
7th	(United States) Vincent Cannino	Vinnie	Ice Climbers

Project M Singles (382 entrants)
Place	Player	Alias	Character(s)
1st	(Sweden) Adam Lindgren	CT.EMP|Armada	Pit
2nd	(United States) Jason Zimmerman	CT.EMP|Mew2King	Fox, Marth, Mewtwo
3rd	(United States) Larry Holland	DEHF	Falco, Fox
4th	(United States) Brandon Nunnenkamp	Rolex	Snake
5th	(United States) Jeremy Westfahl	Fly Amanita	King Dedede
5th	(United States) Alexander Maguire	Sethlon	Roy
7th	(Canada) Elliot Carroza-Oyarce	Ally	Ike
7th	(United States) Rob Dickson	Oracle	R.O.B.

Super Smash Bros. Singles (157 entrants)
Place	Player	Alias	Character(s)
1st	(United States) Isai Alvarado	CT|Isai	Jigglypuff
2nd	(Japan)	Moyashi	Pikachu, Kirby
3rd	(Canada) Daniel Hoyt	SuPeRbOoMfAn	Captain Falcon, Fox, Pikachu, Kirby
4th	(Mexico) Arturo Hernández	Mariguas	Captain Falcon, Pikachu
5th	(United States) Eduardo Tovar	tacos	Captain Falcon, Yoshi, Kirby
5th	(United States) Justin Hallett	CT|Wizzrobe	Yoshi
7th	(Japan)	Ruoka Dancho	Captain Falcon, Kirby
7th	(Mexico) Jaime Rodriguez	JaimeHR	Fox, Captain Falcon, Samus

== 2015 ==
Apex 2015, which ran from January 30 to February 1, included Super Smash Bros. Melee, Super Smash Bros. for Wii U, Super Smash Bros. Brawl, Super Smash Bros. 64, Pokémon Omega Ruby and Alpha Sapphire, Ultra Street Fighter IV, Guilty Gear Xrd, Ultimate Marvel vs. Capcom 3, Killer Instinct. It was initially hosted at Clarion Hotel Empire Meadowlands in Secaucus, New Jersey and featured the first Melee tournament with over a thousand entrants with 1037 players participating. Super Smash Bros. for Wii U included over 800 entrants.

The tournament was officially sponsored by Nintendo and included a playable demo of Splatoon. Apex dropped Brawl fan mod Project M from its 2015 lineup and all of its qualifiers. Streaming for fangame, Super Smash Bros. Crusade, has also been denied. Lugo alleged he received death threats for the dropping of Project M from some members of the community. In January 2015, Lugo announced he was stepping down from Apex after multiple media reports alleging sexual harassment by tournament attendees.

After a false fire alarm occurred on the morning of January 30, fire marshals discovered that parts of the hotel were in violation of safety codes. The marshals removed access to the ballrooms, which had a partially collapsed roof. The main tournament was delayed for a day and was moved 40 miles away to the Garden State Convention Center in Somerset, New Jersey.

Super Smash Bros. Melee Singles (1,037 entrants)
Place	Player	Alias	Character(s)
1st	(United States) Kevin Nanney	EG|PPMD	Falco, Marth
2nd	(Sweden) Adam Lindgren	[A]|Armada	Peach, Fox
3rd	(Sweden) William Hjelte	Leffen	Fox
4th	(United States) Joseph Marquez	C9|Mango	Fox, Falco
5th	(Japan) Masaya Chikamoto	VGBC|aMSa	Yoshi
5th	(United States) Juan Debiedma	Liquid|Hungrybox	Jigglypuff
7th	(Canada) David MacDonald	EMG|KirbyKaze	Sheik
7th	(United States) DaJuan McDaniel	Shroomed	Sheik

Super Smash Bros. For Wii U Singles (837 entrants)
Place	Player	Alias	Character(s)
1st	(Chile) Gonzalo Barrios	ZeRo	Diddy Kong
2nd	(United States) Samuel Buzby	PL.XFIRE|Dabuz	Olimar, Rosalina and Luma
3rd	(Netherlands) Ramin Delshad	LLL|Mr. R	Sheik
4th	(United States) Wesley Alexander	6WX	Sonic
5th	(Japan) Yuta Uejima	DtN|Nietono	Sheik
5th	(United States) Jason Zimmerman	PL.MVG|Mew2King	Diddy Kong
7th	(Japan) Yuta Kawamura	Abadango	Pac-Man
7th	(United States) Jestise Negron	AO.CT|MVD	Duck Hunt, Little Mac

Super Smash Bros. Singles (188 entrants)
Place	Player	Alias	Character(s)
1st	(Canada) Daniel Hoyt	TEG|SuPeRbOoMfAn	Captain Falcon, Pikachu
2nd	(United States) Eduardo Tovar	tacos	Yoshi, Kirby, Captain Falcon, Jigglypuff
3rd	(United States) Justin Hallett	COG|Wizzrobe	Yoshi
4th	(Mexico) Arturo Hernández	Mariguas	Pikachu, Kirby, Captain Falcon
5th	(United States) Abacus Zilch	TR3G|LD	Fox
5th	(United States)	KeroKeroppi	Kirby, Pikachu
7th	(Mexico) Yoshua Castillo	SF|Dext3r	Pikachu
7th	(United States) Javier Romero	Fireblaster	Yoshi, Mario

Super Smash Bros. Brawl Singles (176 entrants)
Place	Player	Alias	Character(s)
1st	(Canada) Elliot Carroza-Oyarce	Boreal|Ally	Snake
2nd	(United States) Nairoby Quezada	Nairo	Meta Knight
3rd	(United States) Jestise Negron	AO.CT|MVD	Snake
4th	(United States) Saleem Young	CT|Salem	Zero Suit Samus
5th	(Canada) Vishal Balaram	V115	Zero Suit Samus
5th	(United States) Vincent Cannino	PL.XFIRE|Vinnie	Ice Climbers
7th	(Germany) Ufuk Fidan	cyve	Diddy Kong
7th	(Japan) Takeshi Shimizu	Shimitake	Pikachu

== 2016 ==
After the controversies surrounding the 2015 event, there were doubts over the future of the Apex tournament. However Andre "Bifuteki" Augustin announced that the event would continue under his leadership. Apex 2016 was the seventh edition of the Apex series which took place on June 17–19, 2016 under the new management of the Bifuteki crew. The event was considerably smaller the previous incarnation and even had to cancel its Brawl event due to low turnout.

Super Smash Bros. for Wii U (309 entrants)
Place	Player	Alias	Character(s)
1st	(United States) Samuel Buzby	Dabuz	Rosalina
2nd	(United States) James Makekau-Tyson	CLG|VoiD	Sheik, Mewtwo, Fox
3rd	(Japan) Yuta Uejima	DNG|Nietono	Diddy Kong
4th	(United States) Jason Zimmerman	FOX.MVG|Mew2King	Cloud
5th	(United States) Tyler Martins	Marss	Zero Suit Samus
5th	(Canada) Kelsy Medeiros	Circa.HoH|SuperGirlKels	Sonic
7th	(United States) Gavin Dempsey	DMG|Tweek	Cloud
7th	(United States) James Wade	DMG|James	Cloud, Diddy Kong, Luigi

Super Smash Bros. Melee (159 entrants)
Place	Player	Alias	Character(s)
1st	(United States) Jason Zimmerman	FOX.MVG|Mew2King	Sheik, Marth
2nd	(United States) James Lauerman	Mafia	Peach
3rd	(United States) Ryan Coker-Welch	CT|The Moon	Marth
4th	(United States) Hendrick Pilar	DJ Nintendo	Fox
5th	(United States) John Daily	GG|Minty	Samus
5th	(United States) Nick Stango	Stango	Marth
7th	(United States) Michael Serpico	PudgyPanda	Ice Climbers
7th	(United States) Bryan Somaiah	Kaeon	Fox

Super Smash Bros. 64 (55 entrants)
Place	Player	Alias	Character(s)
1st	(United States) Tommy Speziale	Koroshiyo|Stranded	Pikachu, Captain Falcon, Kirby
2nd	(United States) Maxim Korobskiy	Sedda|Star King	Kirby, Yoshi
3rd	(United States) Javier Romero	Fireblaster	Yoshi, Mario
4th	(United States) Rob Stone	cobr	Kirby, Captain Falcon, Samus, Pikachu
5th	(United States) Steve Pisano	DFX	Fox, Pikachu
5th	(United States) Gerald Thomas	GIMP|NTA	Captain Falcon, Mario, Samus
7th	(United States) Keefe Mitman	Nebs|Zeppelin	Captain Falcon
7th	(United States) Hernan Sedda	Sedda	Fox

== 2022 ==
Apex 2022 took place on November 18–20, 2022 in Secaucus, New Jersey. It featured Melee, Ultimate, Smash 64, Brawl, and Smash 4 events.

Super Smash Bros. Melee (461 entrants)
Place	Player	Alias	Character(s)
1st	(Japan) Masaya Chikamoto	aMSa	Yoshi
2nd	(United States) Zain Naghmi	Zain	Marth
3rd	(United States) Juan DeBiedma	Hungrybox	Jigglypuff
4th	(United States) Cody Schwab	iBDW	Fox
5th	(United States) Jeffrey Williamson	Axe	Pikachu
5th	(United States) Dawud Rahman	Aklo	Fox, Link
7th	(United States) Jake DiRado	Jmook	Sheik
7th	(Canada) Kurtis Pratt	Moky	Fox

Super Smash Bros. Ultimate (607 entrants)
Place	Player	Alias	Character(s)
1st	(Japan)	Miya	Mr. Game & Watch
2nd	(United States) Jude Harris	Jakal	Wolf
3rd	(United States) Anthony Casale	MPg	Mega Man
4th	(United States) Samuel Robert Buzby	Dabuz	Rosalina & Luma, Min Min
5th	(United States) Darrell Boone	Quandale Dinglelingleton	Steve
5th	(United States)	Syrup	Ness
7th	(United States) David Leon	LeoN	Bowser
7th	(Japan) Gakuto Ito	Gackt	Ness
