= COGnitive Gaming =

American esports organization

- Divisions: Smite, League of Legends, Super Smash Bros., Guilty Gear Xrd Heroes of the Storm
- Founded: July 22, 2013
- Folded: December 31, 2016
- Location: California

COGnitive Gaming was a professional esports team based in the United States. They had teams in Smite, League of Legends, Super Smash Bros. Melee, and Heroes of the Storm.

COGnitive Prime won the first Smite World Championship.

COGnitive sponsored Super Smash Bros. Melee players Jason "Mew2King" Zimmerman and Justin "Wizzrobe" Hallett. COGnitive also signed David "Dacidbro" Broweleit for Guilty Gear Xrd.

COG's League team competed in the League of Legends Challenger Series North America, the second highest level of LoL play after the League of Legends Championship Series North America.

Glaurung and Hospital left the HotS team on December 24, 2015.

On December 12, COGnitive announced that they will be ceasing operations on December 31, 2016, shortly after Super Smash Bros. Melee player, Justin "Wizzrobe" Hallett confirmed to ESPN via Daniel "Tafokints" Lee that he would not be renewing his contract with the team.

== Fighting game roster ==
=== Former ===
ID	Name	Game(s)	Main character(s)	Join date	Leave date
Mew2King	Jason Zimmerman	Super Smash Bros. Melee; Super Smash Bros. for Wii U	Sheik, Marth, Fox; Cloud	April 16, 2015	May 17, 2016
Wizzrobe	Justin Hallett	Super Smash Bros. Melee; Super Smash Bros. 64; Super Smash Bros. for Wii U	Captain Falcon; Yoshi; Sheik	October 20, 2014	December 31, 2016
Dacidbro	David Broweleit	Guilty Gear Xrd -REVELATOR-	Leo	February 19, 2016	December 31, 2016
Kid Viper	Jason Srouji	Guilty Gear Xrd -REVELATOR-	Johnny	July 8, 2016	December 31, 2016
