= Project M =

Mod of Super Smash Bros. Brawl

- Logo
- Developer: Project M Development Team
- Designer: Project M Development Team
- Series: Super Smash Bros. (unofficially)
- Platform: Wii
- Release: February 7, 2011
- Genre: Fighting
- Modes: Single-player, multiplayer

Project M is a mod of the 2008 fighting game Super Smash Bros. Brawl for the Wii, created by the community group known as the Project M Development Team (PMDT; previously known as the Project M Back Room). It is designed to retool Brawl to play more like its two predecessors, Super Smash Bros. (1999) and Super Smash Bros. Melee (2001), in response to fan objections to Brawl's physics, slower-paced gameplay, larger use of chance elements, and mechanics of certain attacks. Project M reintroduces Dr. Mario (although as a palette swap of Mario), Mewtwo, and Roy, who were present in Melee but were cut from Brawl due to time constraints. In addition, it features a new art style for in-game menus and allows players to choose certain characters individually when they are only accessible as transformations of other ones in Brawl.

Development started in early 2010 with the goals of reworking Falco Lombardi to mechanically play like he did in Melee and increasing the accessibility of the gameplay style, but the project quickly evolved to a full-scale reworking of Brawl. The game's first demo build was released on February 7, 2011, and development continued until December 1, 2015, when the PMDT announced it would cease further development of Project M. The game has received positive comments from reviewers, amassed a player base of over 500,000, surpassed three million downloads, and been played in many professional tournaments.

== Gameplay ==
Project M's character selection screen allows the player to select Zero Suit Samus, Sheik, Squirtle, Ivysaur, or Charizard individually, instead of having to switch to them from another character. Project M also features Dr. Mario (although as a palette swap of Mario), Mewtwo, and Roy, who were cut from Brawl's roster.

Super Smash Bros. Brawl, which Project M modifies, is a fighting game with a battle system more similar to that of the game prior to Brawl, Super Smash Bros. Melee. Players battle in arenas of varying sizes and levels of complexity, controlling characters with a variety of play styles. They can attack one another with their own repertoires of special moves, or with a basic attack. Attacks can be avoided by jumping or using a short-lived shield move. Unlike most traditional fighting games, the Super Smash Bros. games do not include standard health gauges, but a percentage counter; there is no point at which a character is automatically knocked out from the counter getting too high, but they will be knocked farther with increasing damage. Being knocked off the screen—or falling off oneself—causes a knock-out. Players may use items for offensive purposes, such as guns and swords, or for healing purposes, such as food and heart containers. The stages, characters, and items are drawn from Nintendo's video game franchises such as Mario, Pokémon, The Legend of Zelda, and Metroid, along with Sega's Sonic the Hedgehog series and Konami's Metal Gear series. The victor of a match has no standard determining factor. Rather, depending on the settings, victory may be reached, for example, by being the last player alive using a stock system, or by achieving the most KOs after a set amount of time.

Super Smash Bros. Melee (2001), Brawl's predecessor in the Super Smash Bros. series, has a similar gameplay style, but there are major differences in areas such as control, general movement styles, and character balancing. Project M was designed to incorporate elements of Melee while still being distinctive in its own right. The designers' "about" page lists a number of aspects from Melee that they aimed to carry over, including fast-paced gameplay, "flowing, natural movement", a "great deal of control" in the player's movements, a balance of offense and defense—though they favored offense over defense slightly—and a complex system of combo attacks. The Project M development team's goal was to give Brawl more balanced gameplay, adding mechanics from Melee back into Brawl, as well as buffing characters to be about as powerful as Fox, the character near-universally considered to be the best in Melee. In addition, some characters who had been present in Melee but scrapped for Brawl were brought back. The game files can be downloaded from its official website and exported to the player's console via an SD card. Players who own an NTSC Wii can install the game without any software modifications, but they must delete all custom stages created in Brawl because of the way files are stored.

== Development ==
A large number of competitive Super Smash Bros. Melee players were disappointed upon the release of its sequel Brawl six-and-a-half years after the release of Melee. The general consensus among competitive players was that the latter game's developers had reworked the older battling system to better appeal to casual gamers, by making the attacks and movement of the game significantly slower in general and adding a greater degree of randomness, luck, and unpredictability, in contrast to Melee, which has more straightforward, skill-based gameplay. Of particular infamy was a new "tripping" mechanic, by which a character occasionally and randomly slips and falls when changing their direction while running.

Project M first began as a development project to rework the character Falco to play like he did in Melee. The designers' goal at the time was for the game to be accessible to newcomers and encourage people to get better at the game, which was accomplished by creating a character roster that is more balanced. The mod's first demo was announced on January 15, 2011, with a release date of late January or early February in time for the Pound 5 tournament, where it was featured. It featured 14 of the 39 characters in Brawl, as well as new stages Brawl had not included. It was later given a solid date of February 7, 2011. A patch was later created to fix the demo's bugs and fine-tune the player's control of their movement direction after being attacked.

By the release of the game's second demo in March 2011, the team's goals for the mod had expanded to a total overhaul of Brawl to better match Melee's gameplay mechanics. A newer build added 11 characters and was first playable at the Genesis 2 tournament. The second demo, released on April 15, 2012, added four new characters as well as more stages and changes in multiple characters' gameplay mechanics. Players of this second demo reported a number of bugs, but these were fixed shortly afterwards in version 2.1. A demo version numbered 2.5 was announced on September 10, 2012; it featured changes such as balance updates, aesthetic improvements, stage updates, and palette swaps for the characters. Version 2.5 was released on December 28.

Originally as part of an April Fool's Day joke, the PMDT announced that a new "Turbo mode"—inspired by a YouTube video called "Melee Impossible" that showed off powerful combos—would be featured in the upcoming version 3.0. The designers set up a Turbo Tuesday video series showing off the mode with various characters, such as Mario and Ike, once a week. A 2.6 demo was announced on June 26, 2013, and it was released on July 17, 2013. The designers hoped to feature the Turbo mode in this update, but it was not ready in time. The designers added a "Clone Engine" to the game that allowed them to make the character Roy, whose only appearance in the Super Smash Bros. series at the time was in Melee. They designed Roy by taking a clone of Marth and changing the clone into the desired result, along with using the same use of the engine to make the character Mewtwo, albeit with major edits to its model, due to it and Lucario having different move-sets. In order to avoid cease-and-desist letters from Nintendo, the designers explained that they would not use this engine to make new fighters who debuted in Super Smash Bros. for Nintendo 3DS and Wii U. The designers added new alternate costumes for a number of characters, including Dr. Mario, who was previously cut from Brawl, for Mario. It was given a release date of December 9, 2013 with a final character count of 41, more than any previous Super Smash Bros. game at the time. Senior designer Corey Archer stated that there would probably be only one more update before he considers Project M complete; he suggested that this update may contain new Nintendo characters.

Version 3.5 was released on November 14, 2014. This revision refines the game's user interface, adds new stages and costumes, adds a few new original musical pieces, redesigns several stages from the original Super Smash Bros. using new HD visuals, and implements new modes such as a debug mode and "All-Star Versus," a mode allowing players to use a different character on every life. A public beta of Version 3.6 was released on June 23, 2015. It added more costumes and stages, new music, a new in-game announcer, and the ability for players to choose between the modified and unmodified versions of stages before battle among other changes. This was the first non-demo version of Project M which has had a public beta before final release. Version 3.6 was officially released on August 16, 2015, and included even more additional content on top of what was present in the Beta release. Included were additional balance stages, a brand new Wario Land stage, more music, a new announcer to replace the one used in the Beta and various tweaks and fixes to bugs and errors found during the 3.6 Beta period.

On December 1, 2015, the PMDT announced it would cease further development of Project M, effective immediately, in favor of beginning development on an original project. The development team denied allegations that legal threats from Nintendo were the cause of the project's termination. According to the team's attorney and business consultant, Ryan Morrison, the decision was not made as a result of a cease-and-desist notice or legal action by Nintendo. One member of the development team stated that the mod's cancellation was to prevent future legal issues. A few members of the PMDT were later hired by game studio Wavedash Games who was developing Icons: Combat Arena, a fighting game with similar mechanics to Super Smash Bros..

After Nintendo sent a cease and desist letter to tournament organizer The Big House for their use of the Slippi emulator in their 2020 Melee tournament, Project M's official website was updated for the first time in several years, voicing support for the Smash Bros. community and linking to a mod derived from Project M, called Project+.

=== Characters ===
Project M includes a number of adjustments and tweaks intended to make the characters from Super Smash Bros. Melee and Super Smash Bros. Brawl more balanced, as well as add touches that felt more true to their games of origin. For example, the staff felt that the character Wario in Brawl took too much influence from the WarioWare series of games and not enough from his older appearances in the Wario Land series of games, so they changed him to better reflect the Wario Land games. Mario was redesigned to be a cross between his Melee incarnation and his heavier-hitting clone from the same game, Dr. Mario. Peach was changed to make her turnip attacks more similar to Melee than in Brawl, after Brawl's advent had diminished their usefulness. Bowser, a character who was generally not considered viable for tournament play in previous games, was given armor and increased attack power and made larger. These adjustments gave him the ability to reach enemies easier while making him an easier target for opponents. Yoshi was given an improved recovery and defense. While Ganondorf's strength was changed to function closer to that of his appearance in Melee, his neutral special has also been changed to a floating descent in the air and a backhand to deflect projectiles on the ground. Additionally, the characters Mewtwo and Roy, who had been present in Melee but were cut from the cast in Brawl, were added back to the roster and given new abilities to make the previously low-tier characters more viable.

Before the project was discontinued, several newcomers were planned for addition, including Knuckles the Echidna from Sonic the Hedgehog, Lyn from Fire Emblem, and Isaac from Golden Sun. A development build containing these characters was leaked on 4chan in the aftermath of the project's discontinuation.

== Reception ==
The Project M Development Team claimed that the 2.0 demo had received 46,000 downloads by May 23, 2012, and 100,000 by December 9, 2013. As of November 15, 2014, Project M version 3.0 has been downloaded over 920,000 times. The version 3.6 beta has been downloaded over 106,791 times, and version 3.5 has been downloaded over 615,809 times as of July 25, 2015.

Project M 2.5 was featured for a special invitation 16-person tournament at Apex 2013. Version 3.0 was featured the following year as well, but was omitted from inclusion at Apex 2015, prompting negative reactions from players.

The game has received positive attention from the media. Ryan Rigney of Wired called it the best iteration of Super Smash Bros. and felt that it successfully transforms Brawl into a serious competitive game. Similarly, Patricia Hernandez of Kotaku called it the "best Smash Bros. mod around" and remarked that it "improves the game so much, it practically seems new." Jordan Devore of Destructoid stated that it was one of the highest-quality mods he had ever seen. Zach Betka from GamesRadar called the game "beautiful" and enjoyed the presence of "many edits that will make the average Smash fan squeal."

Prior to its discontinuation, Nintendo's Miiverse Internet forum would apply an automatic ban to those who mentioned Project M on the grounds of it being "criminal content", including the acronym "PM".
