= Super Smash Bros. (video game) =

1999 fighting game

- North American box art
- Developer: HAL Laboratory
- Publisher: Nintendo
- Director: Masahiro Sakurai
- Producers: Hiroaki Suga; Satoru Iwata; Kenji Miki; Shigeru Miyamoto
- Programmer: Yoshiki Suzuki
- Artist: Tsuyoshi Wakayama
- Composer: Hirokazu Ando
- Series: Super Smash Bros.
- Platforms: Nintendo 64, iQue Player
- Release: Nintendo 64: JP: January 21, 1999; NA: April 26, 1999; EU: November 19, 1999; iQue Player: CHN: November 15, 2005
- Genre: Fighting
- Modes: Single-player, multiplayer

Super Smash Bros. (Note: Known in Japan as Nintendo All Star! Great Melee Smash Brothers (ニンテンドウオールスター!大乱闘スマッシュブラザーズ, Nintendō Ōru Sutā! Dai Rantō Sumasshu Burazāzu) and retroactively referred to as Super Smash Bros. 64 or Smash 64) is a 1999 crossover fighting game developed by HAL Laboratory and published by Nintendo for the Nintendo 64. It is the first game in the Super Smash Bros. series and was released in Japan on January 21, 1999; in North America on April 26, 1999; and in Europe on November 19, 1999. It was later released for the iQue Player in China on November 15, 2005.

The game is a crossover among different Nintendo franchises, including Mario, The Legend of Zelda, Star Fox, Yoshi, Donkey Kong, Metroid, F-Zero, Mother, Kirby and Pokémon. It presents a cast of characters and locations from these franchises and allows players to use each character's unique skills and the stage's hazards to inflict damage, recover health, and ultimately knock opponents off the stage.

Super Smash Bros. received generally positive reviews upon its release. It was a commercial success, selling over five million copies worldwide by 2001, with 2.93 million sold in the United States and 1.97 million sold in Japan. It was given an Editors' Choice award from IGN for the "Best Fighting Game", and also became a Nintendo 64 Player's Choice title. The game spawned a series of sequels for each successive Nintendo console, starting with Super Smash Bros. Melee, which was released for the GameCube in 2001.

== Gameplay ==
Ness facing Kirby on the unlockable Mushroom Kingdom stage, based on the Mario franchise

The Super Smash Bros. series is a departure from the general genre of fighting games. Instead of depleting an opponent's life bar, Smash Bros. players seek to knock opposing characters off the stage. Each player has a damage total, represented by a percentage, which increases as damage is taken. As this percentage rises, the character is knocked progressively further by attacks. To knock out (KO) an opponent, the player must send that character flying off the edge of the stage, which is not an enclosed arena, but rather an area with open boundaries. When knocked off the stage, a character may use jumping moves in an attempt to return. Some characters possess longer-ranged jumps and may have an easier time "recovering" than others.

While games such as Street Fighter and Tekken require the player to memorize complicated button-input combinations, Super Smash Bros. uses the same control combinations to access all moves for every character. Characters are additionally not limited to only facing opponents, instead being allowed to move freely. The game focuses more on aerial and platforming skills than other fighting games, with larger, more dynamic stages rather than a simple flat platform. Smash Bros. also implements blocking and dodging mechanics. Grabbing and throwing opposing characters is also possible. Support for the Nintendo 64 Rumble Pak is included.

Various weapons and power-ups can be used in battle to inflict damage, recover health, or dispense additional items. They fall randomly onto the stage in the form of items from Nintendo franchises, such as Koopa shells, hammers, and Poké Balls. The nine multiplayer stages are locations taken from or in the style of Nintendo franchises, such as Planet Zebes from Metroid and Sector Z from Star Fox. Although stages are rendered in three dimensions, players move within a two-dimensional plane. Stages are dynamic, ranging from simple moving platforms to dramatic alterations of the entire stage. Each stage offers unique gameplay and strategic motives, making the chosen stage an additional factor in the fight.

In the single-player mode, the player battles a series of computer-controlled opponents in a specific order, attempting to defeat them with a limited number of lives in a certain amount of time. While the player can determine the difficulty level and the number of lives, the series of opponents never changes. If the player loses all of their lives or runs out of time, they can continue at the cost of overall points. This mode is referred to as Classic Mode in later games. The single-player mode also includes two minigames, "Break the Targets" and "Board the Platforms", in which the objective is to break each target or board multiple special platforms, respectively. A "Training Mode" is also available in which the player can manipulate the environment and experiment against computer opponents without the restrictions of a standard match.

Up to four people can play in the multiplayer mode, which has specific rules predetermined by the players. Stock and timed matches are two of the multiplayer modes. This gives each player a certain number of lives or a selected time limit, before starting the match with a countdown. Free-for-all or team battles are also a choice during matches using stock or time. A winner is declared once time runs out, or if each player except one or a team have lost all of their lives. A multiplayer game may also end in a tie if two or more players have the same score when the timer expires, which causes the match to end in sudden death. During sudden death, all fighters are given 300% damage and the last fighter standing will win the match.

== Characters ==
The game includes twelve playable characters from popular Nintendo franchises. Characters have a symbol appearing behind their damage meter corresponding to the series to which they belong, such as a Triforce behind Link's and a Poké Ball behind Pikachu's. Furthermore, characters have recognizable moves derived from their original series, such as Samus's charged blasters and Link's arsenal of dungeon items. Eight characters are initially playable, and four additional characters can be unlocked by meeting specific criteria.

The character art featured on the box art and instruction manual is in the style of a comic book, and the characters are portrayed as toy dolls that come to life to fight. This style has since been omitted in later games, which feature trophies instead of dolls and in-game models rather than hand-drawn art.

== Development ==
A screenshot of Dragon King: The Fighting Game, a prototype version of Super Smash Bros. without crossover elements

Super Smash Bros. was developed by HAL Laboratory, a Nintendo second-party developer. Masahiro Sakurai was interested in making a fighting game for four players. He made a presentation of what was then called Dragon King: The Fighting Game (格闘ゲーム竜王, Kakutō Gēmu Ryūō) to co-worker Satoru Iwata, who joined to help on the project. At this stage in development, the game was still using placeholder character models. Sakurai understood many fighting games did not sell well and that he had to think of a way to make his game original.

His first idea was to include famous Nintendo characters and put them in a fight. Knowing that he would not receive permission if he asked ahead of time, Sakurai made a prototype of the game in September 1997 without informing Nintendo, and did not show anyone until it was well-balanced. The prototype he presented featured Mario, Donkey Kong, Samus and Fox as playable characters. It was shown to Nintendo at the end of 1997, and the idea was later approved. Although never acknowledged by Nintendo or any developers behind Super Smash Bros., third-party sources have identified Namco's 1995 fighting game The Outfoxies as a possible inspiration, with Sakurai also crediting the idea of making a beginner-friendly fighting game to an experience in which he defeated a couple of casual gamers on The King of Fighters '95 in an arcade. According to Sakurai, the title came from Satoru Iwata when they were considering different names for the title. Iwata suggested the use of "brothers" (shortened to "Bros."), as, according to Sakurai, "his reasoning was that, even though the characters weren't brothers at all, using the word added the nuance that they weren't simply fighting – they were friends who were settling a little disagreement."

On October 20, 2022, Sakurai, who still had the prototype of Dragon King: The Fighting Game, demonstrated its gameplay and its differences from the final product of Super Smash Bros. Multiple planned characters were cut during development including Marth, King Dedede, Bowser, and Mewtwo. All four of these characters were added to later games. Clefairy was also considered as an alternative to Jigglypuff.

=== Music ===
Super Smash Bros. features music from some of Nintendo's popular gaming franchises. While many are newly arranged for the game, some pieces are taken directly from their sources. The music for Super Smash Bros. was composed by Hirokazu Ando, who later returned as sound and music director for Super Smash Bros. Melee. A complete soundtrack was released on CD in Japan through Teichiku Records in 2000.

== Release ==
The game was revealed as early as November 1998 and plans for a North American release were revealed in February 1999. To promote the game's launch, Nintendo of America staged an event called Slamfest '99, held at the MGM Grand Adventures theme park in Las Vegas, Nevada, on April 24, 1999. The event featured a real-life wrestling match between costumed performers dressed as Mario, Yoshi, Pikachu, and Donkey Kong, as well as stations set up for attendees to preview the game. The costumes were re-used from the game's television commercial, which featured the four mascot costumes fighting each other set to "Happy Together" by The Turtles. The wrestling match was live-streamed on the web via RealPlayer, and was available to be re-watched for several months afterward via a downloadable file from the event's official website.

== Reception ==
Reception

Aggregate scores
Aggregator	Score
GameRankings	79%
Metacritic	79/100

Review scores
Publication	Score
AllGame	4/5
Electronic Gaming Monthly	8.5/10, 8.5/10, 8.5/10, 9/10
EP Daily	2/10
Famitsu	31/40
Game Informer	8.5/10
GameRevolution	B
GameSpot	7.5/10
IGN	8.5/10
Jeuxvideo.com	16/20
N64 Magazine	90%
Next Generation	5/5
Nintendo Power	7.7/10

Award
Publication	Award
IGN	Best Fighting Game

Upon its initial Nintendo 64 release, Super Smash Bros. received "generally favorable" reviews according to review aggregator site Metacritic, based on 11 reviews. Its score on Metacritic matches that of GameRankings at 79%. Critical praise was directed towards its multiplayer mode, music, "original" fighting game style, and simple learning curve. IGN highlighted the multiplayer mode, calling it, "an excellent choice for gamers looking for a worthy multiplayer smash 'em-up." GameSpot expressed that the game is "extremely simple to learn and easy to master" and said "the game's real charm comes out in four-player mode." Japanese gaming magazine Famitsu rated it a 31 out of 40. Comparing it to previous attempts at four-player fighting games, Game Informer said Super Smash Bros. "does a fine job of proving that the more characters onscreen, the better."

IGN criticized the battle stage and character offerings as "much too limited" and "routine" in the single-player experience. Despite praising the graphical and audio quality, GameCritics.com noted the fast-paced gameplay presented problems with the scoring system, stating, "It's ridiculous that the number of times you and your opponents are thrown off-stage are not tallied for you and on-screen so you to see." GameSpot's former editorial director, Jeff Gerstmann, noted the single-player game "won't exactly last a long time". Electronic Gaming Monthly said that its "novel concept alone makes this game worth checking out", but it "may not be worth the cash" for a single-player experience.

Super Smash Bros. was commercially successful, becoming a Nintendo 64 Player's Choice title, selling 1.97 million copies in Japan and 2.93 million in the United States as of 2008. The Academy of Interactive Arts & Sciences named Super Smash Bros. as a finalist for "Console Action Game of the Year" and "Console Fighting Game of the Year" at the 3rd Annual Interactive Achievement Awards.
