= List of major Super Smash Bros. Ultimate tournaments =

List of most notable tournaments in Super Smash Bros. Ultimate

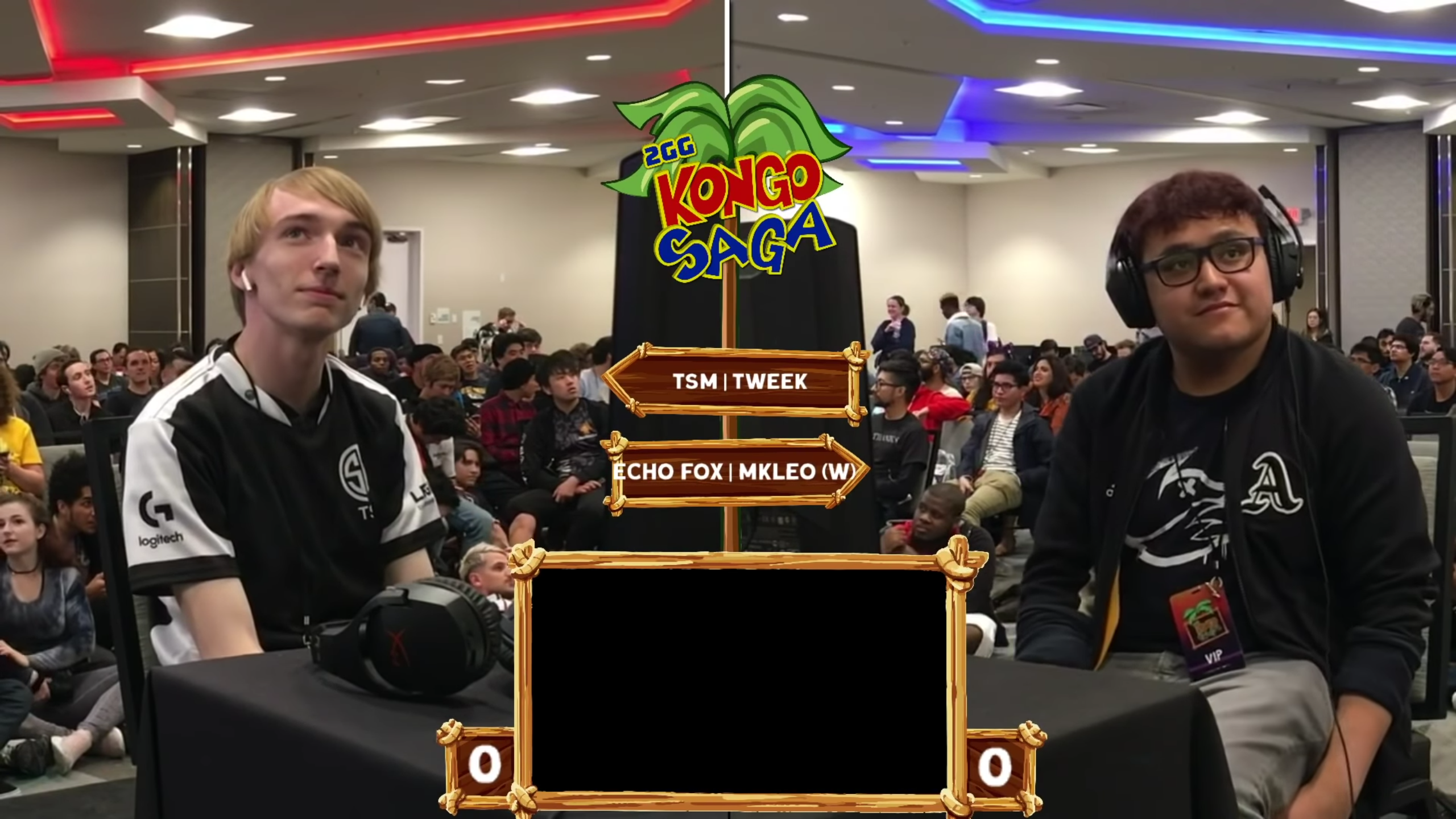
Tweek (left) and MkLeo (right) moments before the start of the Grand Finals of the Singles tournament of 2GG: Kongo Saga, a Supermajor held in 2019.

Super Smash Bros. Ultimate is a crossover fighting video game for the Nintendo Switch. Players control one of over 80 characters drawn from Nintendo and third-party game franchises, and try to knock their opponents out of an arena. Each player has a percentage meter which rises when they take damage; characters become easier to knock into the air or out of bounds as the percentage increases. Like with all other Super Smash Bros. games, Ultimate's competitive scene features both Singles (1v1) and Doubles (2v2) tournament, with Ultimate introducing a new form of 1v1 competition named "Squad Strike" in which the players switch between different characters during a same game; Singles competition is largely seen as the most prestigious form of Super Smash Bros. competition.

Games in the Super Smash Bros. franchise have been played competitively since the early 2000s, but the inclusion of Super Smash Bros. Melee at the 2013 edition of Evolution Championship Series (Evo), a major multi-game tournament, was seen as a turning point; after Evo 2013, competitive Smash saw an increase in tournaments, media coverage, and attention from Nintendo. Super Smash Bros. Ultimate is the fifth officially released Smash Bros. title; all five have been played competitively, in addition to a fan-made mod of Super Smash Bros. Brawl, Project M. Many of the top-ranked Ultimate players were highly ranked in previous Smash Bros. games, in particular Super Smash Bros. for Wii U.

Ultimate was released on December 7, 2018, to critical acclaim, and broke sales records in the United States and Europe en route to becoming the best-selling fighting game of all time. The release of Ultimate saw an increase in the number of people entering and watching tournaments, leading to an increase in available prize money compared to Super Smash Bros. for Wii U. However, unlike many other developers, Nintendo does not contribute funds to tournament prize pools. As a result, the prize pools for Ultimate are still significantly smaller than those of other fighting games. The Ultimate tournament at Evo 2019 had just over 3,500 entrants, which made it the largest offline tournament held in Smash Bros. franchise history. However, its prize pool of $35,300 - $10 from each player's registration fee - was smaller than that of Street Fighter V, which had only 1,951 entrants, but whose developer Capcom contributed $50,000 to the prize pool. Additionally, Japanese law significantly limits cash prizes for esports events held in that country. Some Japanese tournaments use legal loopholes to provide cash prizes, while others offer non-cash prizes, including tickets for players to attend American tournaments. Nintendo received widespread criticism after Ultimate was the only game at Evo Japan 2020 not to offer a cash prize. While other games' developers joined the Japan Esports Union, allowing them to offer prizes, Nintendo did not, and instead awarded the winner a Switch controller emblazoned with a gold Smash Bros. logo. In a January 2020 interview, Nintendo president Shuntaro Furukawa indicated that the company did not intend to support esports, stating that the company's focus was on inclusiveness, and their ability to create games that many people want to play, without the need for prize money, was one of Nintendo's strengths.

Smash Bros. tournaments are generally seeded so that the best players do not face off against each other until the later stages of a tournament. The most authoritative ranking of Super Smash Bros. Ultimate players is the Panda Global Rankings Ultimate (PGRU). The PGRU groups tournaments into one of four tiers – S, A, B, and C – based on the number of entrants, with S being the most prestigious tier and C the least. Tournaments can also qualify for higher tiers by having a large number of highly ranked players, even if the overall number of entrants is lower. Tournaments held outside of the United States require fewer entrants to qualify for higher tiers, owing to their smaller competitive communities. S-tier and A-tier events are frequently called "Majors", with S-tier tournaments sometimes called "Supermajors"; winning a Major is largely considered the most prestigious accomplishment in Ultimate. This list contains all PGRU Majors – S- and A-tier events – from the release of Ultimate through the present. (Note: Due to the COVID-19 pandemic, the PGRU suspended the competitive season in mid-March 2020.)

== PGRU S-tier tournaments ==
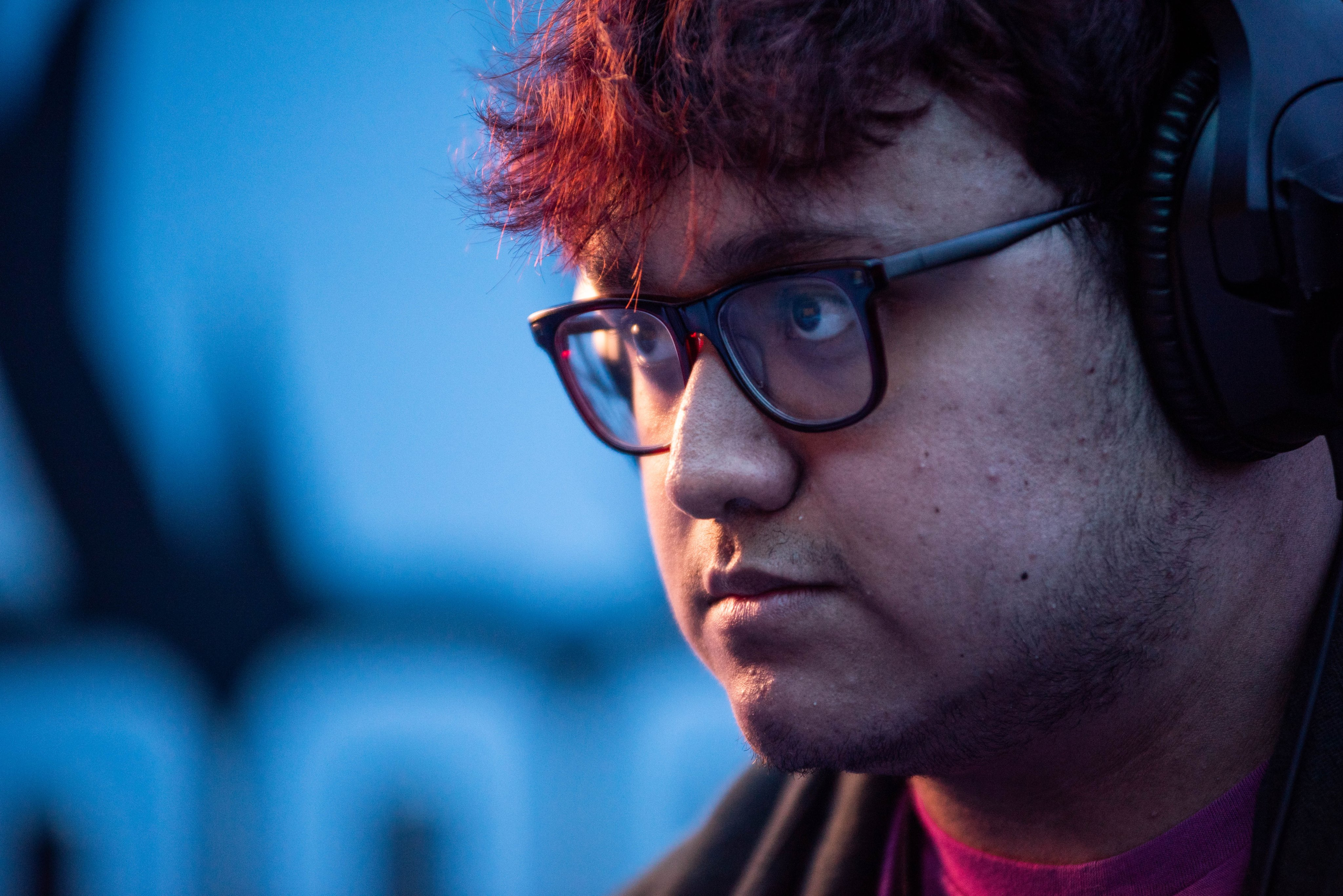
Mexico's MkLeo holds the record for most Ultimate Singles Majors won, with ten S-tier events and five A-tier events won to date; those include Genesis 6, the first Supermajor in Ultimate history, which took place in the United States.

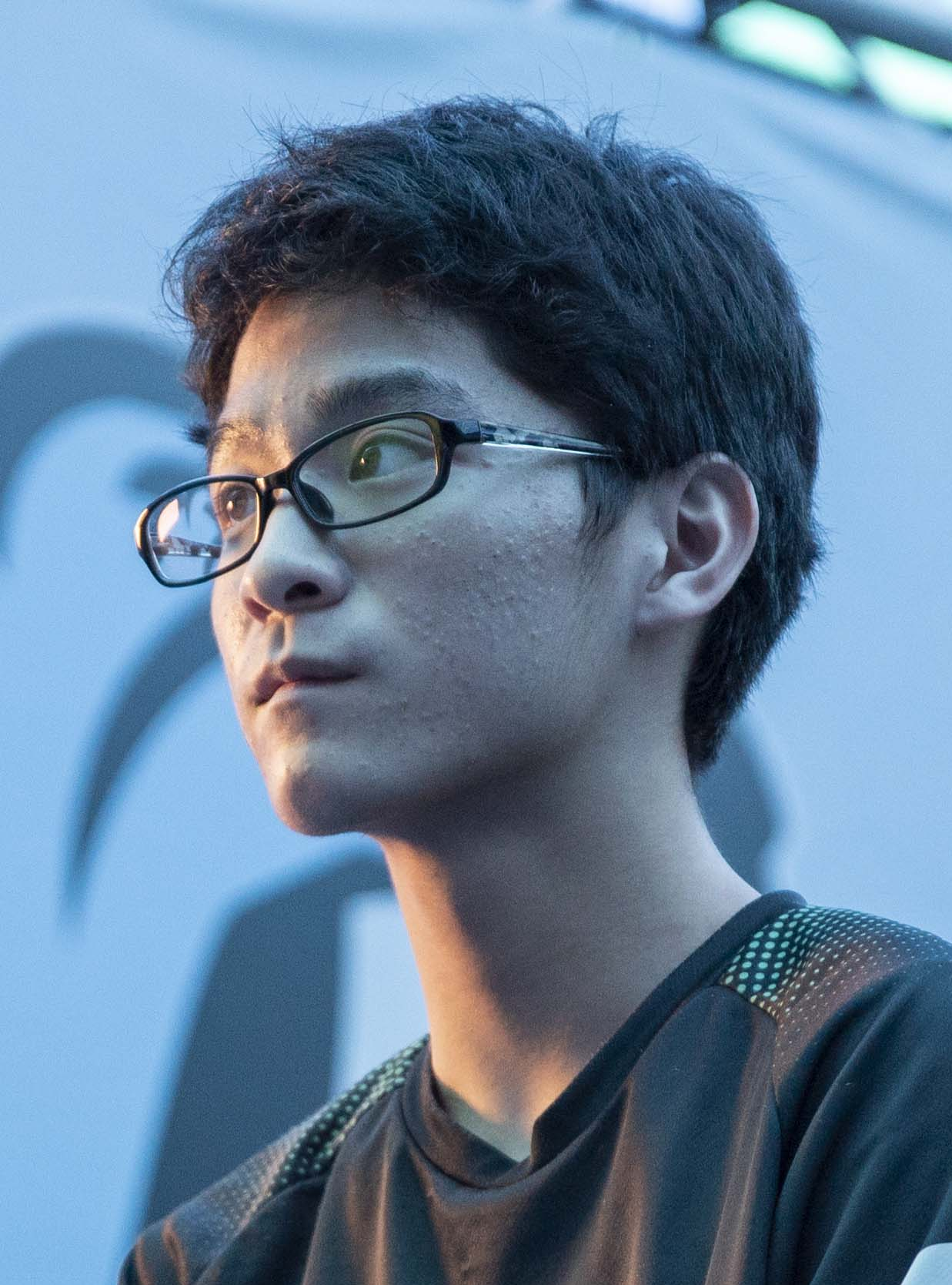
Japan's zackray holds the record for most Majors won in his country; Japanese tournaments rarely offer money prizes, unlike the rest of the world's, and Majors usually only hold Singles tournaments.

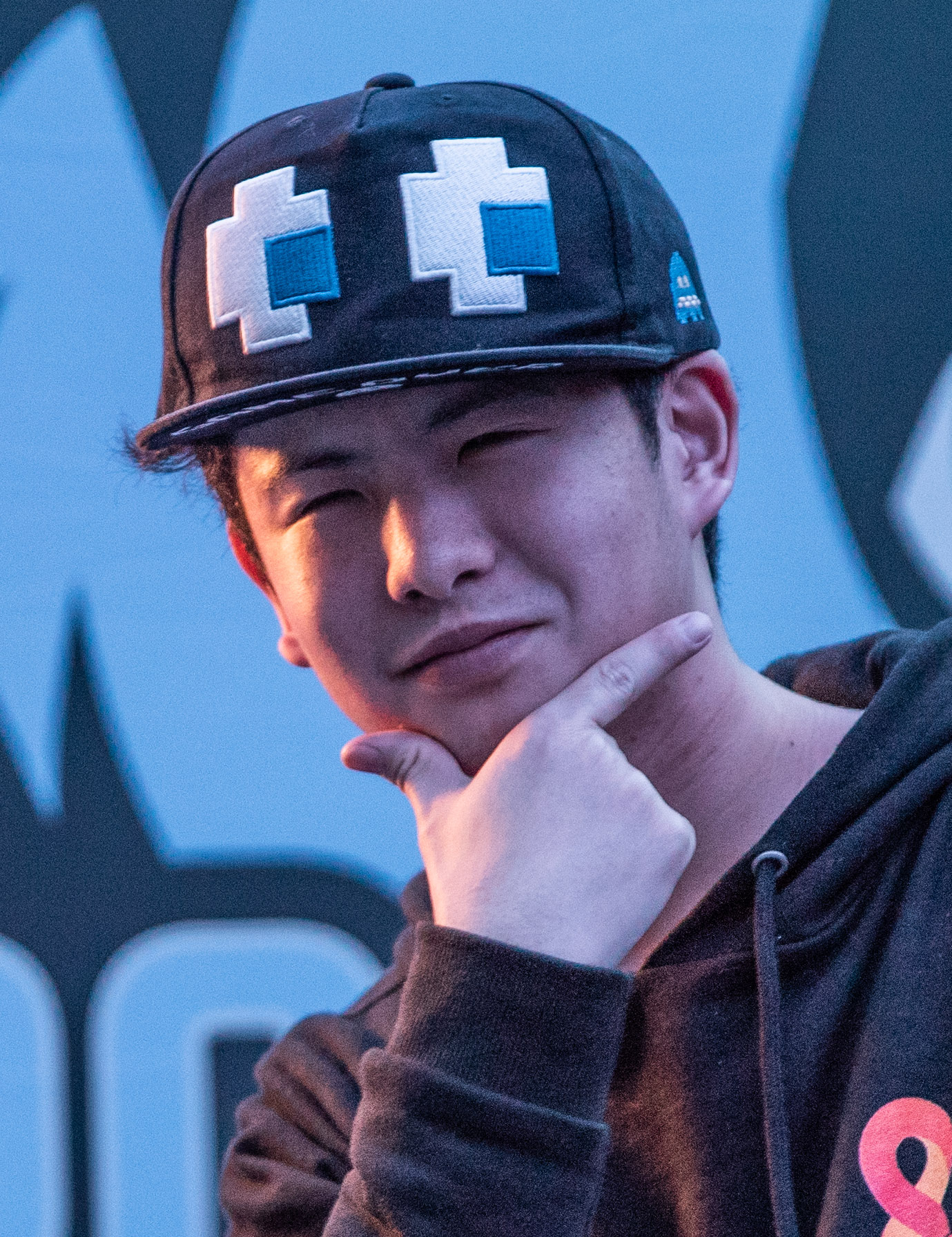
Japan's Tea won Europe's first Supermajor, Temple: Hermès Edition.

The following is a list of results from Super Smash Bros. Ultimate tournaments considered S-tier by the Panda Global Rankings Ultimate:

List of S-tier Super Smash Bros. Ultimate tournaments
Tournament	Location	Date	Entrants (Note: Entrant counts are drawn from smash.gg, the tool that tournament organizers use to manage brackets. The data is self-reported.)	Prize pool	Singles		Doubles		Refs.
Tournament	Location	Date	Entrants	Prize pool	1st	2nd	1st	2nd	Refs.
Genesis 6	Oakland, California, United States	February 2–3, 2019	2,105	$20,890	(Mexico) MkLeo	(United States) VoiD	(United States) Dark Wizzy (United States) Salem	(United States) Light (United States) Marss	
Frostbite 2019	Detroit, Michigan, United States	February 22–24, 2019	1,239	Unknown	(United States) Tweek	(Mexico) MkLeo	(United States) Marss (United States) Tweek	(United States) ESAM (United States) MVD	
Umebura Japan Major	Tokyo, Japan	May 1–2, 2019	1,015	¥0	(Japan) Kameme	(Japan) ProtoBanham	—N/a		
MomoCon 2019	Atlanta, Georgia, United States	May 23–26, 2019	1,280	$10,000	(Mexico) MkLeo	(United States) Tweek	(Canada) Ally (United States) Samsora	(United States) Marss (Mexico) MkLeo	
Smash'N'Splash 5	Wisconsin Dells, Wisconsin, United States	May 31 – June 2, 2019	1,610	Unknown	(Mexico) MkLeo	(United States) Samsora	(United States) Dark Wizzy (United States) Nairo	(Canada) Ally (Netherlands) Mr. R	
Evo 2019	Las Vegas, Nevada, United States	August 2–4, 2019	3,529	$35,300	(Mexico) MkLeo	(United States) Tweek	—N/a		
Super Smash Con 2019	Chantilly, Virginia, United States	August 8–11, 2019	2,708	Unknown	(Mexico) MkLeo	(United States) Samsora	(United States) Light (United States) Marss	(Mexico) Javi (Mexico) MkLeo	
Shine 2019	Worcester, Massachusetts, United States	August 23–25, 2019	882	Unknown	(United States) Samsora	(Mexico) MkLeo	(United States) Dark Wizzy (Mexico) MkLeo	(United States) Light (United States) Marss	
Mainstage	Ontario, California, United States	September 20–22, 2019	273	$5,000	(United States) Nairo	(Mexico) MkLeo	(France) Glutonny (Mexico) MkLeo	(United States) Nairo (United States) Samsora	
The Big House 9	Detroit, Michigan, United States	October 4–6, 2019	1,017	$10,170	(Japan) zackray	(United States) Dabuz	(Japan) Shuton (Japan) zackray	(United States) Light (United States) Marss	
2GG: Kongo Saga	La Mirada, California, United States	December 7–8, 2019	909	Unknown	(Mexico) MkLeo	(United States) Tweek	(France) Glutonny (Mexico) MkLeo	(Mexico) Maister (Japan) zackray	
Let's Make Big Moves	New York City, New York, United States	January 3–6, 2020	650	$6,350+	(United States) Nairo	(United States) Dabuz	(United States) Dark Wizzy (United States) Light	(United States) Marss (United States) Samsora	
Evo Japan 2020	Tokyo, Japan	January 24–26, 2020	1,819	¥0	(Japan) Shuton	(Japan) Kome	—N/a		
Genesis 7	Oakland, California, United States	January 24–26, 2020	1,699	$20,566	(United States) Marss	(Mexico) MkLeo	(United States) Light (United States) Marss	(France) Glutonny (Mexico) MkLeo	
Frostbite 2020	Detroit, Michigan, United States	February 21–23, 2020	1,280	$12,800	(Mexico) MkLeo	(Mexico) Maister	(United States) Light (United States) Marss	(Mexico) Maister (Japan) zackray	
Kagaribi#4	Tokyo, Japan	June 26–27, 2021	386	¥0	(Japan) ProtoBanham	(Japan) zackray	—N/a		
Temple: Hermès Edition	Villeneuve-d'Ascq, France	September 4–5, 2021	863	€8,630	(Japan) Tea	(France) Glutonny	—N/a (Note: A Doubles tournament started on the first day; however, it was cancelled the following morning due to logistical issues.)		
Riptide	Sandusky, Ohio, United States	September 10–12, 2021	1,024	$10,240	(Mexico) MkLeo	(United States) Tweek	(United States) Lui$ (United States) Scend (Note: BestNess changed his name to Scend in 2020.)	(United States) Epic_Gabriel (Mexico) Sparg0	
Low Tide City	Round Rock, Texas, United States	September 10–12, 2021	1,024	$11,010	(Mexico) MkLeo	(United States) Dabuz	(United States) Lui$ (United States) Scend	(Mexico) Javi (Mexico) MkLeo	
Kagaribi#5	Tokyo, Japan	October 20, 2021	512	¥0	(Japan) zackray	(Japan) Shuton	—N/a		
Mainstage 2021	Ontario, California, United States	November 12–14, 2021	830	$8,300	(Mexico) MkLeo	(Mexico) Sparg0	(United States) ESAM (United States) MVD	(United States) Light (United States) Marss	
Smash World Championship 2021	Orlando, Florida, United States	December 17–19, 2021	40	$75,000	(Mexico) MkLeo	(United States) Cosmos	—N/a		
Collision 2022	North Bergen, New Jersey, United States	March 12–13, 2022	361	$11,250	(Mexico) Sparg0	(United States) Tweek	(France) Glutonny (Mexico) MkLeo	(Mexico) Chag (Mexico) Sparg0	
Genesis 8	San Jose, California, United States	April 15–17, 2022	1,959	$29,385	(Mexico) MkLeo	(France) Glutonny	(Mexico) Chag (Mexico) Sparg0	(Mexico) BigBoss (Mexico) MkLeo	
Pound 2022	Laurel, Maryland, United States	April 22–24, 2022	280	Unknown	(France) Glutonny	(Mexico) MkLeo	—N/a		
Kagaribi#7	Tokyo, Japan	May 4-5, 2022	769	¥0	(Japan) acola	(Japan) Asimo	—N/a		
MomoCon 2022	Atlanta, Georgia, United States	May 4-5, 2022	666	$14,990	(United States) Light	(United States) Dabuz	(United States) Lui$ (United States) Scend	(United States) Goblin (United States) Zomba	
COLOSSEL 2022	Lyon, France	April 15–17, 2022	1,024	$21,735	(Mexico) MkLeo	(Mexico) Maister	—N/a		
Double Down 2022	Las Vegas, Nevada, United States	July 8-10, 2022	987	$14,805	(Japan) ProtoBanham	(Mexico) MkLeo	(United States) Lui$ (United States) Scend	(Mexico) BigBoss (Mexico) MkLeo	
Smash Factor 9	Puebla, Puebla, Mexico	July 29-31, 2022	681	TBD	(Mexico) MkLeo	(United States) Dabuz	(Mexico) BigBoss (Mexico) MkLeo	(Mexico) Maister (Mexico) Skyjay	
Super Smash Con 2022	Chantilly, Virginia, United States	August 11-14, 2022	1,347	TBD	(United States) Onin	(Mexico) Maister	(Mexico) MkLeo (Spain) Sisqui	(United States) Light (United States) Marss	
The Big House 10	Detroit, Michigan, United States	October 7-9, 2022	636	TBD	(Canada) Riddles	(United States) Light	(Mexico) Maister (Mexico) Skyjay	(United States) Light (United States) Marss	
Ludwig Smash Invitational	Las Vegas, Nevada, United States	October 21-23, 2022	32	$52,502	(Mexico) MkLeo	(Japan) acola	—N/a		
Let's Make Moves Miami	Miami, Florida, United States	October 28-30, 2022	467		(Japan) acola	(United States) Onin	(Japan) acola (United States) Onin	(United States) Ned (United States) Dark Wizzy	
Mainstage 2022	Ontario, California, United States	December 2-4, 2022	512		(Mexico) Sparg0	(United States) Tweek	(United States) Lui$ (United States) Scend	(Canada) Ouch!? (Canada) Blacktwins13	
Let's Make BIG Moves 2023	New York, New York, United States	January 6-8, 2023	790		(United States) Tweek	(Mexico) Sparg0	(Mexico) Sparg0 (Mexico) Chag	(Mexico) BigBoss (Mexico) MkLeo	
Genesis 9	San Jose, California, United States	January 20-22, 2023	1215		(Mexico) MkLeo	(United States) MuteAce	(Mexico) Sparg0 (Mexico) Chag	(United States) MuteAce (United States) Scend	

== PGRU A-tier tournaments ==
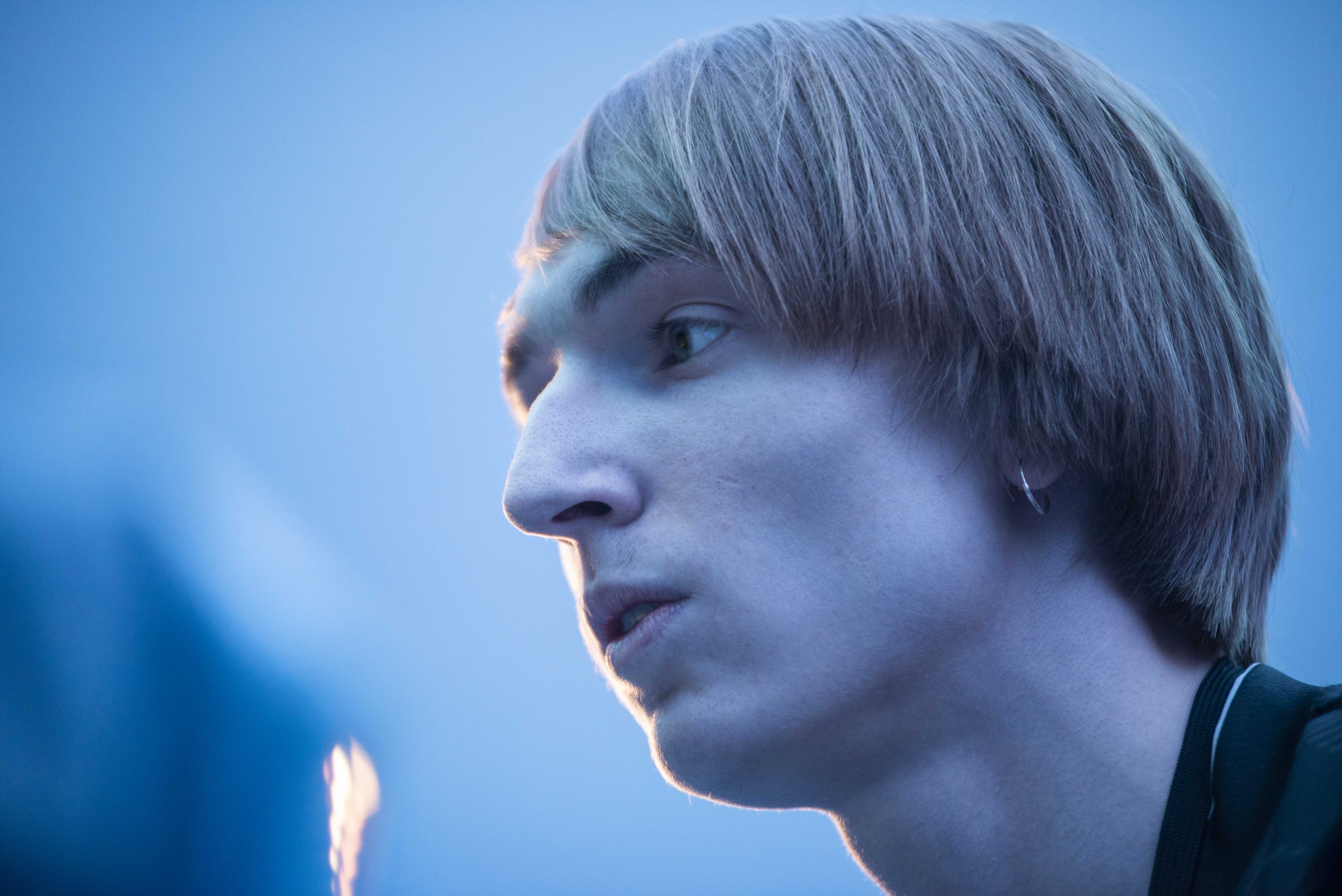
United States' Tweek won both the first Singles Major and Doubles Major tournaments in Ultimate history, at Let's Make Moves; it was the only Major event held in 2018, the year of the game's release.

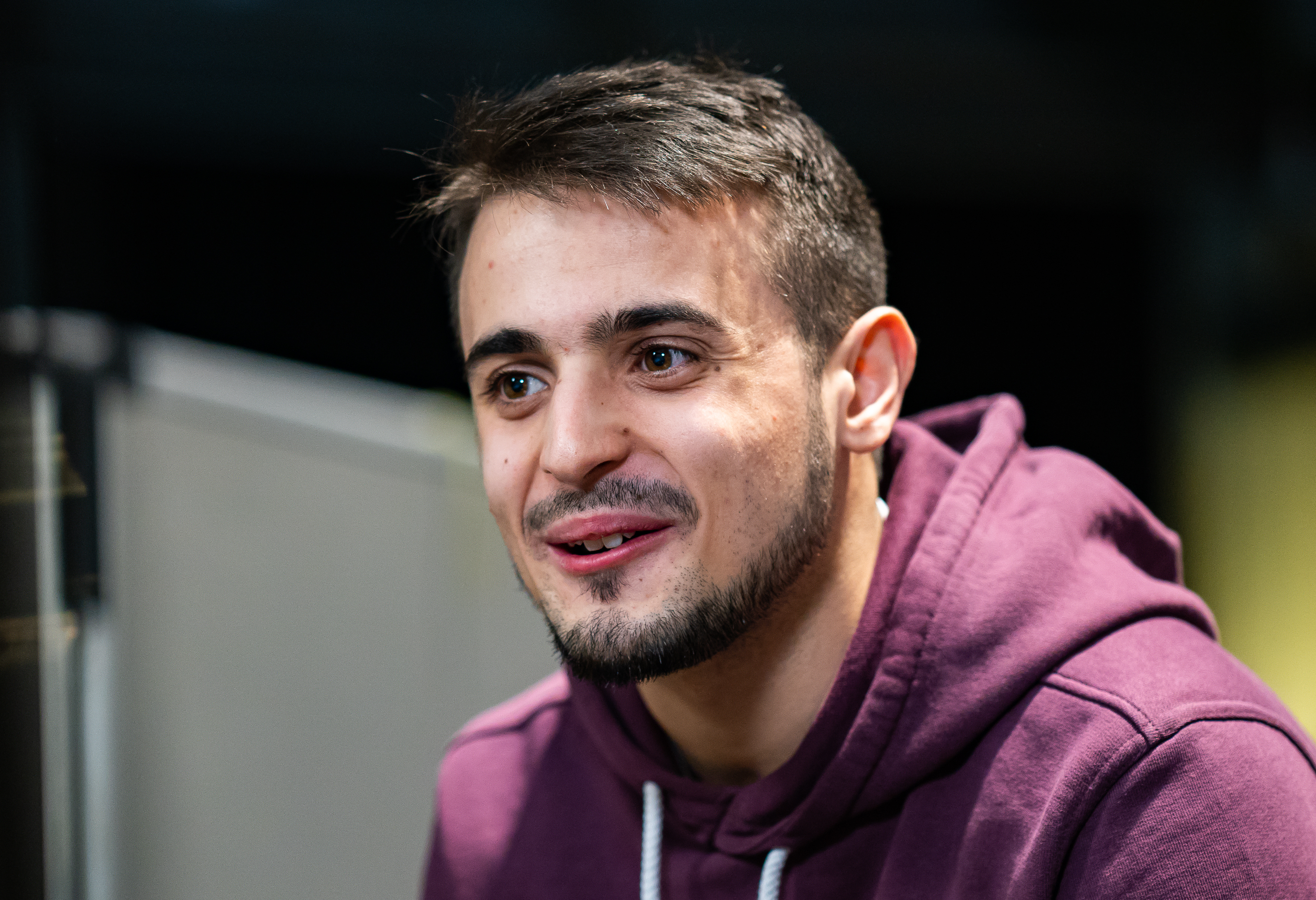
France's Glutonny won Europe's first Ultimate Singles Major, Syndicate 2019, held in the Netherlands.

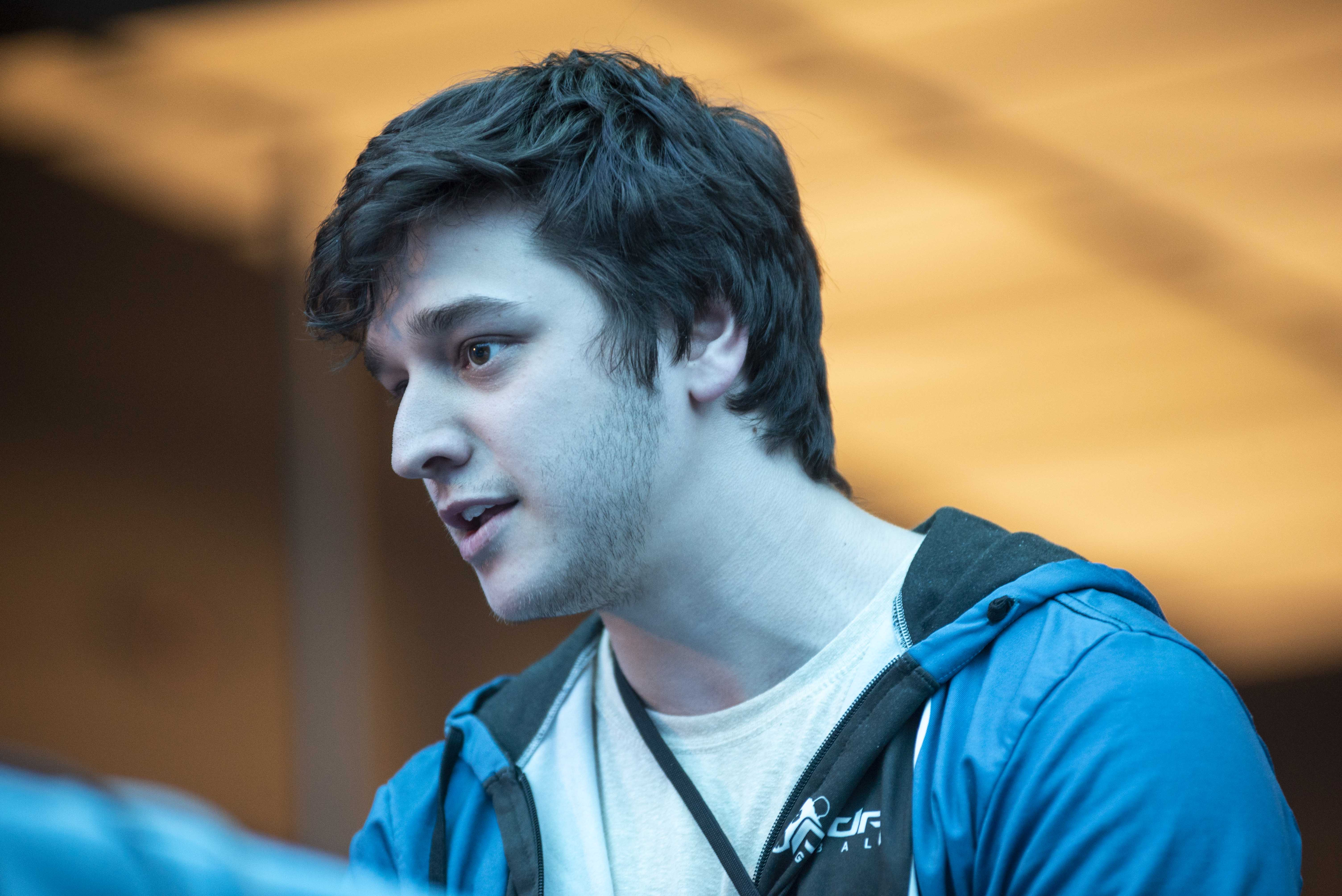
United States' Marss won the first Ultimate Singles Major held in Mexico, Smash Factor 8.

The following is a list of results from Super Smash Bros. Ultimate tournaments considered A-tier by the Panda Global Rankings Ultimate:

List of A-tier Super Smash Bros. Ultimate tournaments
Tournament	Location	Date	Entrants	Prize pool	Singles		Doubles		Refs.
Tournament	Location	Date	Entrants	Prize pool	1st	2nd	1st	2nd	Refs.
Let's Make Moves (Note: This tournament was retroactively recognized as a Major after the PGRU established its tournament ranking system.)	Somerset, New Jersey, United States	December 29, 2018	448	Unknown	(United States) Tweek	(United States) Dabuz	(United States) Cosmos (United States) Tweek	(United States) Light (United States) Xion	
Umebura SP 2	Tokyo, Japan	January 12, 2019	500	¥0	(Japan) Zackray (Note: Zackray changed the capitalization of his name to "zackray" during 2019.)	(Japan) Shuton	—N/a		
Glitch 6	Laurel, Maryland, United States	January 19–20, 2019	551	Unknown	(United States) Tweek	(United States) Nairo	(Canada) Ally (Mexico) MkLeo	(United States) Cosmos (United States) Tweek	
Smash Ultimate Summit	Los Angeles, California, United States	January 19–20, 2019	16	$51,917	(Mexico) MkLeo	(United States) Dabuz	—N/a		
Umebura SP 3	Tokyo, Japan	April 12, 2019	509	¥0	(Japan) Nietono	(Japan) Kameme	—N/a		
2GG: Prime Saga	La Mirada, California, United States	April 13–14, 2019	842	Unknown	(Japan) Shuton	(Japan) zackray	(Mexico) Javi (Mexico) MkLeo	(Japan) Shuton (Japan) zackray	
Pound 2019	Laurel, Maryland, United States	April 19–21, 2019	802	Unknown	(Canada) Ally	(United States) Myran	(United States) Light (United States) Marss	(United States) Nairo (United States) Samsora	
Get On My Level 2019	Toronto, Ontario, Canada	May 17–19, 2019	847	Unknown	(United States) Tweek	(United States) Marss	(Mexico) MkLeo (Mexico) Serge!	(United States) Cosmos (United States) Nairo	
CEO 2019	Daytona Beach, Florida, United States	June 28–30, 2019	1,164	Unknown	(Mexico) MkLeo	(United States) Marss	—N/a		
Albion 4	(United Kingdom) London, England	July 6–7, 2019	895	Unknown	(France) Glutonny	(United States) Dabuz	(Spain) Greward (Spain) Marc (Note: Marc also used the name Marcbri in some tournaments.)	(France) Glutonny (France) Leon	
Low Tier City 7	Arlington, Texas, United States	July 12–14, 2019	696	Unknown	(United States) Tweek	(United States) Dabuz	(United States) Light (United States) Marss	(United States) BestNess (United States) Lui$	
Smash Factor 8	San Pedro Cholula, Mexico	July 26–28, 2019	532	Unknown	(United States) Marss	(Mexico) MkLeo	(Mexico) Javi (Mexico) MkLeo	(France) Glutonny (Netherlands) Mr. R	
Umebura SP 4	Tokyo, Japan	August 17, 2019	517	¥0	(Japan) Abadango	(Japan) Brood	—N/a		
Switchfest 2019	La Mirada, California, United States	August 31 – September 1, 2019	447	Unknown	(Japan) Kameme	(Japan) Tea	(United States) MVD (United States) Puppeh	(Japan) HIKARU (Japan) Kameme	
Glitch 7 (Note: Glitch 7 was expected to be an S-tier event, but lost its status due to one of the top-ranked players dropping out of the event. The following PGRU season, a rule change was made to prevent an event's tier from dropping due to a single player disqualifying.)	Laurel, Maryland, United States	September 14–15, 2019	566	Unknown	(United States) ESAM	(United States) Light	(United States) Nairo (United States) Tweek	(United States) Dark Wizzy (United States) Light	
Umebura SP 5	Tokyo, Japan	September 28, 2019	512	¥0	(Japan) Shuton	(Japan) zackray	—N/a		
Ultimate Fighting Arena 2019	Aubervilliers, France	October 4–6, 2019	490	€8,000	(Mexico) MkLeo	(France) Glutonny	(Germany) Longo (Mexico) MkLeo	(Germany) cyve (Netherlands) Mr. R	
Thunder Smash 3: Clash of the Pandas	Long Beach, California, United States	October 12, 2019	86	$10,000+	(Japan) Tea	(United States) Marss	—N/a		
Umebura SP 6	Tokyo, Japan	October 21–22, 2019	722	¥0	(Japan) Kuro	(Japan) Kameme	—N/a		
Smash Ultimate Summit 2	Los Angeles, California, United States	October 24–27, 2019	16	$50,000+	(Mexico) MkLeo	(United States) Samsora	—N/a		
Syndicate 2019	Utrecht, Netherlands	October 25–27, 2019	640	Unknown	(France) Glutonny	(Germany) quiK	(France) Glutonny (France) Leon	(Germany) Lucky (Germany) Rinor	
DreamHack Atlanta 2019	Atlanta, Georgia, United States	November 15–17, 2019	641	$10,000	(United States) Marss	(United States) Samsora	(United States) Cosmos (United States) Light	(United States) Marss (United States) ScAtt	
Umebura SP 7	Tokyo, Japan	November 16, 2019	758	¥0	(Japan) zackray	(Japan) KEN	—N/a		^{9:00}
EGS Cup 3	Tokyo, Japan	January 12–13, 2020	128	¥0	(Japan) zackray	(Japan) Abadango	—N/a		
Glitch 8	Laurel, Maryland, United States	January 18–19, 2020	729	Unknown	(United States) Tweek	(United States) Dark Wizzy	(United States) ESAM (United States) MVD	(United States) Cosmos (Mexico) Maister	
Kagaribi#3	Tokyo, Japan	March 27, 2021	132	¥0	(Japan) Tea	(Japan) Atelier	—N/a		
Ultimate WANTED #3	Créteil, France	August 12–15, 2021	525	€7,500	(France) Glutonny	(United States) Fatality	(France) Glutonny (France) Leon	(Spain) Marcbri (Spain) sisqui	
Smash Ultimate Summit 3	Los Angeles, California, United States	August 26–29, 2021	16	$159,132	(United States) Tweek	(Mexico) MkLeo	—N/a		
Glitch 8.5	Laurel, Maryland, United States	September 24–26, 2021	421	$6,315	(United States) ESAM	(Mexico) MkLeo	(United States) Light (United States) Marss	(United States) naitosharp (United States) Tilde	
Seibugeki #8	Tokyo, Japan	October 10, 2021	192	¥0	(Japan) ProtoBanham	(Japan) Eim	—N/a		
Super Smash Con: Fall Fest	Herndon, Virginia, United States	October 15–17, 2021	769	$7,690	(United States) Light	(Mexico) Sparg0	—N/a		
MaesumaTOP#6	Osaka, Japan	October 23, 2021	320	¥0	(Japan) ProtoBanham	(Japan) Atelier	—N/a		
Port Priority 6	Tukwila, Washington, United States	October 30–31, 2021	640	$6,726	(Mexico) MkLeo	(Mexico) Sparg0	(United States) BassMage (Mexico) Skyjay	(United States) Javi (Mexico) MkLeo	
Vienna Challengers Arena 2021	Vienna, Austria	November 20–21, 2021	512	€15,120	(United Kingdom) Peli	(France) Glutonny	(France) Glutonny (France) Mika	(France) Oryon (France) PeW	
CEO 2021	Orlando, Florida, United States	December 3–5, 2021	781	$7,810	(United States) Kola	(France) Glutonny	—N/a		
Let's Make Big Moves 2022	New York City, New York, United States	January 7–9, 2022	768	$7,680	(United States) Quidd	(United States) Kola	(United States) Hawk (United States) Linus	(United States) Charles (United States) Quidd	
Kagaribi#6	Tokyo, Japan	January 8–9, 2022	768	¥0	(Japan) zackray	(Japan) Shuton	—N/a		
Glitch: Infinite	Laurel, Maryland, United States	February 18–20, 2022	616	Unknown	(United States) Cosmos	(United States) Zomba	(United States) LeoN (United States) Zomba	(Japan) Gackt (United States) Scend	
Smash Ultimate Summit 4	Los Angeles, California, United States	March 3–6, 2022	16	$157,800	(Mexico) Sparg0	(United States) Light	—N/a		
RETA 2022	Mazatlán, Mexico	April 1–3, 2022	20	TBD	(Mexico) MkLeo	(Mexico) Sparg0	—N/a		
Low Tide City	Round Rock, Texas, United States	April 29-May 1, 2022	561	TBD	(Mexico) Sparg0	(United States) Kola	(United States) Chase (United States) Lui$	(United States) Dark Wizzy (United States) Ned	
MaesumaTOP#7	Osaka, Japan	April 29-May 1, 2022	512	¥0	(Japan) acola	(Japan) Shuton	—N/a		
Battle of BC 4	Vancouver, Canada	June 10-12, 2022	408	TBD	(Japan) KEN	(Japan) Tea	(United States) ESAM (United States) MVD	(United States) BassMage (United States) Tilde	
MaesumaTOP#8	Osaka, Japan	June 11-12, 2022	590	¥0	(Japan) Yoshidora	(Japan) Hero	—N/a		
Gimvitational	Laurel, Maryland, United States	June 16-19, 2022	16	$35,706	(Japan) acola	(United States) Light	—N/a		
Crown 2	Orem, Utah, United States	June 18-19, 2022	416	$12,160	(Japan) Tea	(United States) Dabuz	(United States) Lui$ (United States) Scend	(United States) BassMage (United States) Goblin	
e-Caribana 2022	Crans-près-Céligny, Switzerland	June 19, 2022	32	TBD	(Mexico) MkLeo	(Germany) quiK	—N/a		
CEO 2022	Daytona Beach, Florida, United States	June 24-26, 2022	651	$6,510	(Dominican Republic) Sonix	(Canada) Riddles	—N/a		
95 Kings of Fields 2	Eaubonne, France	June 24-26, 2022	256	$6,510	(Mexico) MkLeo	(France) Raflow	—N/a		
Get On My Level 2022	Toronto, Ontario, Canada	July 1-3, 2022	753	$11,295	(United States) Onin	(Canada) Big D	(United States) Linus (United States) Lucy	(United States) Demon (United States) Onin	
Kagaribi#8	Tokyo, Japan	July 30-31, 2022	771	¥0	(Japan) Miya	(Japan) Abadango	—N/a		
Smash Ultimate Summit 5	Los Angeles, California, United States	September 15-18, 2022	16	TND	(Japan) ProtoBanham	(United States) Light	—N/a		
Glitch - Regen	Laurel, Maryland, United States	September 23-25, 2022	422		(United States) Light	(Japan) Kameme	(United States) Dark Wizzy (United States) Ned	(United States) 6WX (Dominican Republic) Sonix	
Lost Tech City 2022	San Antonio, Texas, United States	September 30-October 2, 2022	418		(United States) Marss	(Mexico) Maister	(United States) Lui$ (United States) Scend	(Mexico) Maister (Mexico) Skyjay	
Port Priority 7	Auburn, Washington, United States	November 12-13, 2022	600		(United States) Tweek	(United States) Kurama	(Japan) Kameme (Japan) Shuton	(United States) Stroder Ame (United States) BassMage	
DreamHack Atlanta 2022	Atlanta, Georgia, United States	November 18-20, 2022	415	$10,000	(United States) ApolloKage	(United States) Anathema	(United States) Tavares (United States) merf	(United States) lolyoshi (United States) Chunky	
Apex 2022	Secaucus, New Jersey, United States	November 18-20, 2022	607		(Japan) Miya	(United States) Jakal	(United States) Zomba (United States) Tilde	(United States) Exciled (United States) LeoN	
Scuffed World Tour	Los Angeles, California, United States	December 18, 2022	16	$25,000	(Mexico) Sparg0	(United States) Tweek	—N/a		
