= Zackray =

Japanese esports player

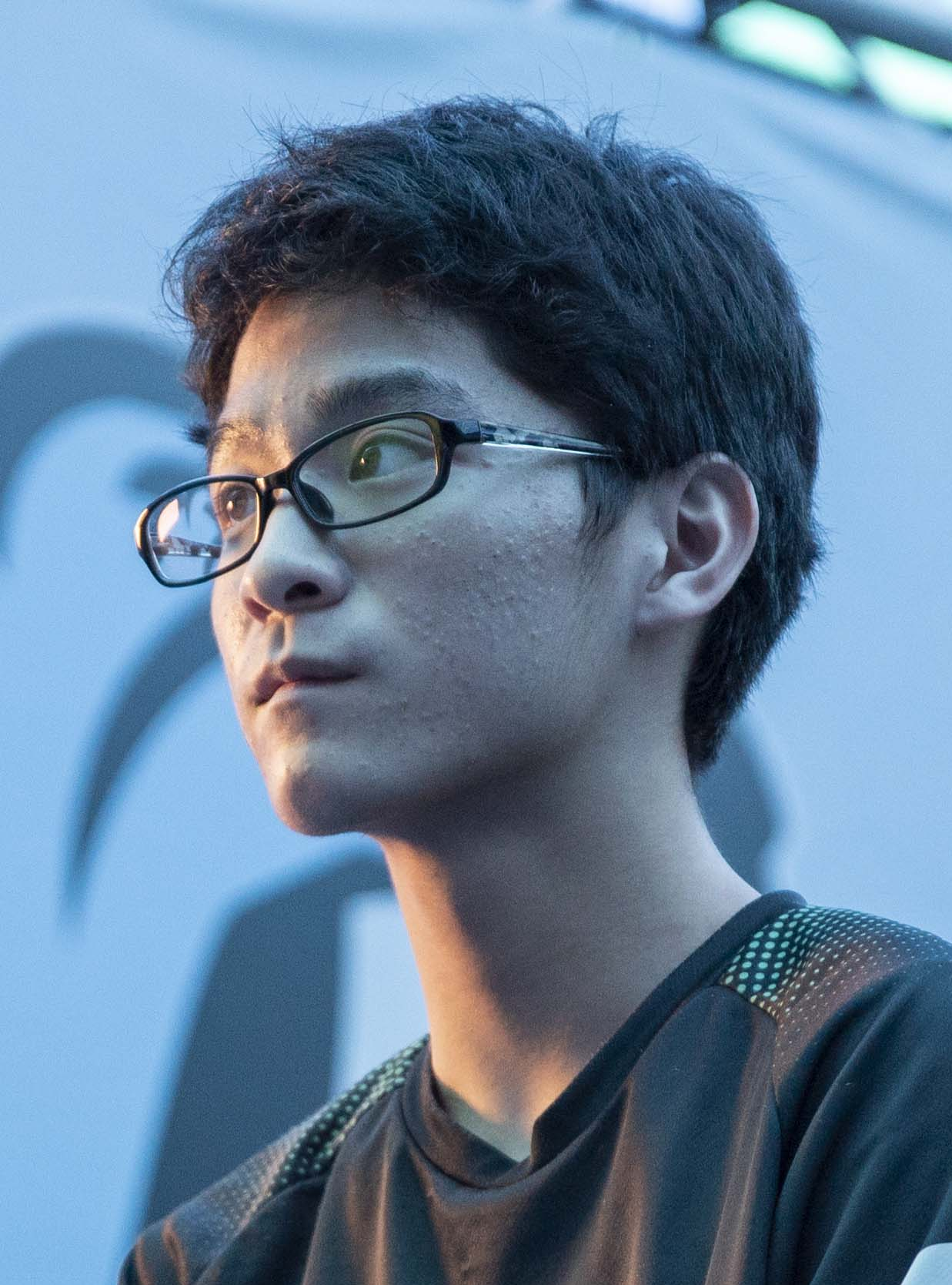
- Zackray at Frostbite 2020

Personal information
- Name: Sota Okada
- Born: 12 March 2002 (age 24)
- Nationality: Japanese

Career information
- Games: Super Smash Bros. Melee; Super Smash Bros. for Wii U; Super Smash Bros. Ultimate
- Playing career: 2017–present

Team history
- 2018–2022: GameWith
- 2022–present: DetonationFocusMe

Career highlights and awards
- Super Smash Bros. Ultimate (7 majors won): 2x Umebura champion (2019); 2x Kagaribi champion (2021, 2022); The Big House champion (2019); EGS Cup 3 champion (2020); Ultimate WANTED #4 champion (2022)

Sota Okada (Japanese: 岡田颯太, Hepburn: Okada Sōta), also known by his gamer tag zackray (Japanese: ザクレイ, Hepburn: zakurei) (stylized Zackray until mid-2019), is a Japanese professional Super Smash Bros. player. As of the end of 2019, he was ranked the seventh best Super Smash Bros. Ultimate player in the world and the highest ranked player from Japan. In October 2019 he won The Big House 9, becoming the first Japanese player to win a premier-tier tournament held outside of Japan.

== Career ==
=== Early career ===
Zackray began competing in Super Smash Bros. for Wii U at the beginning of 2017, several years after the game's release. He also competed in a Super Smash Bros. Melee tournament in July 2018.

Although he was not a well-known player in Smash Bros. for Wii U, in the Panda Global Rankings 100 – a ranking of the 100 best Super Smash Bros. for Wii U players of all time – Zackray was ranked 88th.

=== Super Smash Bros. Ultimate ===
Zackray found immediate success with Super Smash Bros. Ultimate, which launched in December 2018. At the beginning of December, he announced on Twitter that he had signed with esports organization GameWith. He won seven minor tournaments in Japan in the months after the game's release. In February 2019 he traveled to Oakland, California for one of the first major Ultimate tournaments, GENESIS 6. Zackray was a minor at the time and it was the first time he had traveled to the United States for a tournament. After a series of strong performances throughout most of the event, he met his first defeat in the winners' semi-finals, and went on to tie for 5th place.

His performance at GENESIS qualified him for an invitation to Smash Ultimate Summit, a 16-player invitational tournament held in March, where he once again fell in the winners' semi-finals and tied for 5th. In April, Zackray came in second at 2GG: Prime Saga in an all-Japanese final against Shuto "Shuton" Moriya. Months later it became public that Elliot "Ally" Carroza-Oyarce, another elite Ultimate player, had intentionally lost his match against Zackray at the event at the behest of a third player. In addition to these results, over the first half of 2019 Zackray also tied for 33rd at Frostbite 2019 and tied for 7th at the Umebura Japan Major. In the inaugural Panda Global Rankings Ultimate, Zackray was ranked 12th in the world.

In August, Zackray tied for 7th at EVO 2019. He was eliminated by Leonardo "MkLeo" López Pérez, who praised Zackray after the event, saying he considered him "a top-five player" and that defeating him gave MkLeo confidence that he could win the tournament. A week later, he tied for 9th at Super Smash Con 2019. In October, Zackray won The Big House 9, considered a "premier" or "supermajor" tournament, which Dot Esports called "arguably the deepest event for Smash Ultimate so far with nearly every top player in attendance". In the double-elimination tournament, Zackray fell to Enrique "Maister" Hernández Solís in the winner's semi-finals, then defeated Gavin "Tweek" Dempsey, Nairoby "Nairo" Quezada, and Maister in a rematch to make it into the final, where he defeated Samuel "Dabuz" Buzby to win the tournament. His victory at The Big House 9 made Zackray the first Japanese player to win a premier-tier Ultimate tournament held outside of Japan, and it was also Zackray's first tournament win of any tier outside of Japan.

His victory at the event qualified him for an invitation to Smash Ultimate Summit 2, held at the end of the month. He tied for 7th at that event. Owing to these and other results, Zackray moved up to 7th in the Panda Global Rankings Ultimate when the rankings for the latter half of 2019 were released. Additionally, a separate ranking of Japanese players named him the best Japanese Ultimate player for the second half of 2019.

In January 2020, Zackray tied for 5th at EVO Japan 2020. He tied for 7th at Frostbite 2020 the following month after being eliminated in a close match with eventual tournament winner MkLeo. Following this, the COVID-19 pandemic led to the closure of most offline Smash tournaments. In October, Zackray defeated Yuta "Abadango" Kawamura to win the Eastern Powerhouse Invitational, the first significant offline Smash tournament since CEO Dreamland in March. In November, he then beat Kengo "KEN" Suzuki to win Mēsuma. In December, he placed 3rd at Kagaribi after losing to KEN and Seisuke "Kome" Komeda.

In June 2021, Zackray competed at Kagaribi 4, the first supermajor since Frostbite 2020. After losing to Naoto "ProtoBanham" Tsuji in Winner's Quarters, Zackray eliminated "Lea", "Kome", "HERO", and Takuma "Tea" Hirooka to rematch ProtoBanham in Grand Finals. Although Zackray won the first set, he ultimately finished at 2nd after ProtoBanham defeated him in the bracket reset. In October, Zackray won Kagaribi 5 without losing a set, using only the newly released Sora throughout the tournament. In January 2022, he also won Kagaribi 6, primarily using Joker and Sheik.

In March 2022, Zackray announced via YouTube that he would be taking a break from Ultimate for a few months to focus on competing in Pokémon Unite. However, in May, he participated in the Japanese tournament WINNER! #10 and placed 3rd, losing to Kohei "Suinoko" Kuwamoto and Takuto "kameme" Ono, using primarily Sheik. In June, he announced that he would make a full return to Smash Bros., after he and his team were disqualified from the Pokémon Unite Championship Series due to one of his teammates, "U", oversleeping and failing to appear for a match. He made his offline return in August's Ultimate WANTED 4, winning the tournament over Shuto Moriya. He was invited for Ludwig Ahgren's Smash Invitational in October, where he would place 23rd in the tournament's Swiss bracket.

==== Character pool ====
In the Super Smash Bros. franchise, players control one of a large cast of characters drawn from other games. Zackray is known for the number of characters he is able to play at a high level, which Panda Global Rankings' Colton Costopoulos called "one of the deepest character pools in the entire competitive scene". At GENESIS 6, he used Wolf O'Donnell. Two months later, he used Wolf, Lucina, and Wario in his second-place finish at 2GG: Prime Saga. He also used R.O.B. and Pokémon Trainer in tournaments in the first half of 2019. By the time he won The Big House 9, he had picked up Joker. He also briefly used Sonic and Corrin at the event, though did not win games with either. At Smash Ultimate Summit 2, Zackray used seven different characters, including Mr. Game & Watch and Ridley. By the end of 2019, he had also added Mario to his repertoire. Near the end of 2021, Zackray picked up Sora, whom he later solely used to win the supermajor Kagaribi 5. At Kagaribi 6, he used Sheik alongside Joker for most sets, and used only Sheik at WINNER! #10. By February 2023, he had added Pit to his lineup, using him to place 3rd at the supermajor Kagaribi 9.
