= The Big House (tournament) =

Annual video game tournament

- The Big House 6 logo

Tournament information
- Game: Super Smash Bros.
- Location: Michigan
- Established: 2011
- Number of tournaments: 10
- Administrator: Robin "Juggleguy" Harn

Current champion
- Melee: Cody Schwab; Ultimate: Michael "Riddles" Kim; Smash 64: Josh Brody

Final champion
- Project M: Gonzalo "ZeRo" Barrios (2014); Wii U: Brian "Cosmos" Kalu (2018)

The Big House was an annual Super Smash Bros. tournament series held in Michigan, with the first event taking place in 2011. It is considered one of the largest and most prestigious Smash Bros. tournament series alongside GENESIS, Evolution Championship Series (EVO) and Supernova. In 2024, The Big House was put on an indefinite hiatus by the organizers.

== History ==
=== 2011–2014 ===
The first Big House tournament was held on October 22, 2011, on the University of Michigan campus in Ann Arbor, Michigan. 115 entrants participated in Super Smash Bros. Melee singles and the event was won by Oscar "Lovage" Nilsson. It was an Apex 2012 qualifier.

The second tournament was held on October 6–7, 2012 on the campus of the University of Michigan. The Melee event was won by Joseph "Mango" Marquez. Project M was won by Brian "metroid1117" Lin.

The Big House 3 was held from October 12–13, 2013 in Ann Arbor. It was won by Jason "Mew2King" Zimmerman.

The Big House 4 was held from October 4–5, 2014, in Romulus. It was won by Joseph "Mango" Marquez.

=== 2015–2019 ===
The fifth edition of The Big House was held from October 2–4, 2015, in Dearborn. Prior to the tournament, top Swedish player Leffen was denied entry into the United States at customs because of lack of a proper work visa due to his affiliation with an American company, Team SoloMid. The tournament was won by Adam "Armada" Lindgren over Juan "Hungrybox" Debiedma in the grand finals. Super Smash Bros. for Wii U was featured for the first time, and was won by Gonzalo "ZeRo" Barrios, who also won all nationals he attended up to that point, including the super majors Apex 2015 and EVO 2015. There were 1,317 singles entrants for Melee and 512 for Wii U. This iteration of the tournament dropped Project M as an official event.

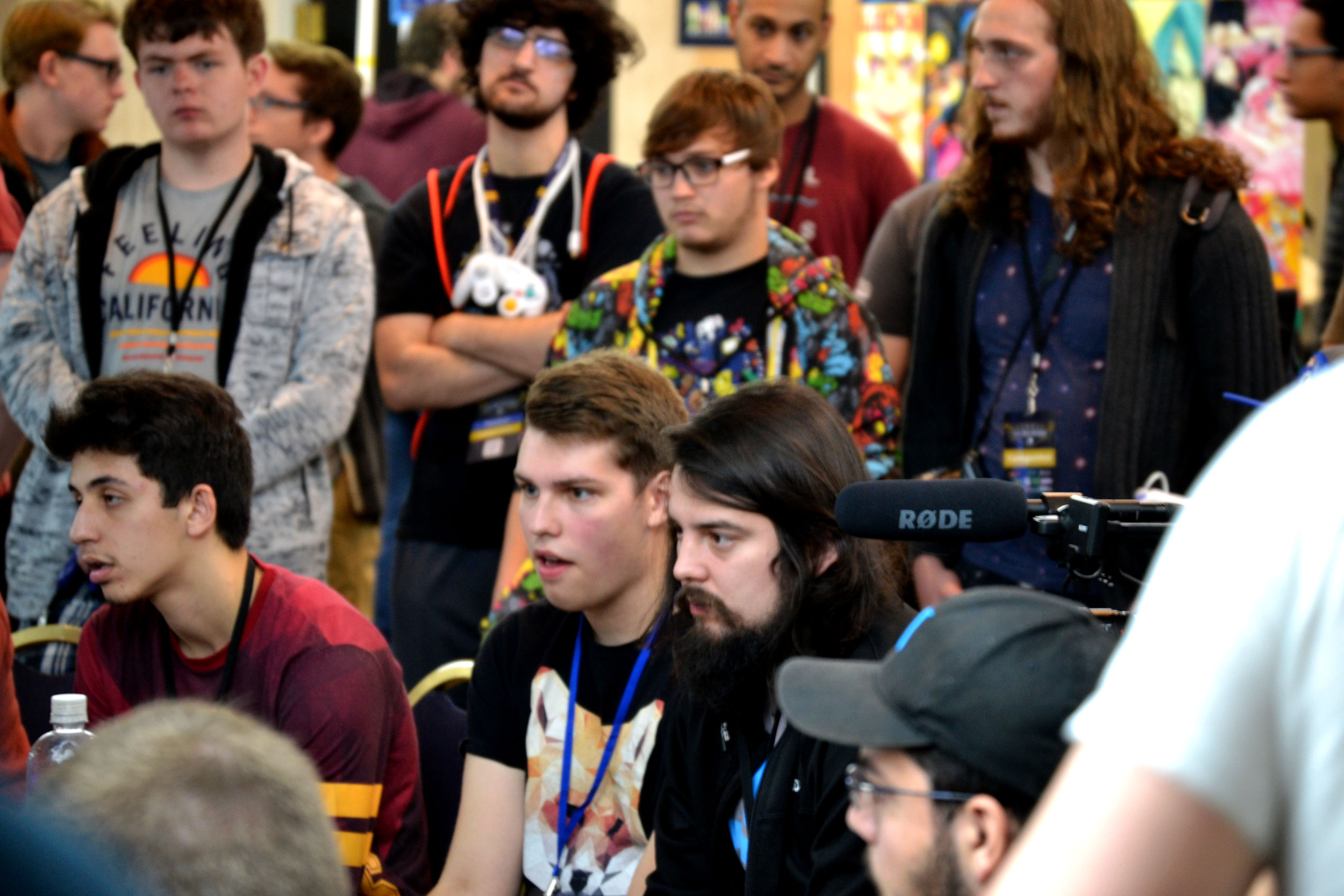
Competitors playing Super Smash Bros. at The Big House 6 (2016)

The sixth Big House was held on October 7–9, 2016. It was the first American tournament that William "Leffen" Hjelte attended since HTC Throwdown 2015. Melee was won by Joseph "Mango" Marquez, marking it as his third win at The Big House. Wii U was won by Gonzalo "ZeRo" Barrios and was his third consecutive title at The Big House.

The seventh Big House was held on October 6–8, 2017, at the Cobo Center in Detroit. Melee was won by Juan "Hungrybox" Debiedma over Justin "Plup" McGrath. Wii U was won by Samuel "Dabuz" Buzby over Tyler "Marss" Martins.

The Big House 8 was held on October 5–7, 2018, and it was once again held at the Cobo Center in Detroit. Melee was won by Juan "Hungrybox" Debiedma over Justin "Plup" McGrath. Wii U was won by Brian "Cosmos" Kalu over Eric "ESAM" Lew. The original Super Smash Bros. was won by Daniel "SuPeRbOoMfAn" Hoyt over Josh Brody.

The Big House 9 was held on October 4–6, 2019, at the Cobo Center in Detroit. Melee was won by Joseph "Mango" Marquez over Zain Naghmi. Super Smash Bros. Ultimate was featured for the first time, and was won by Sota "Zackray" Okada over Samuel "Dabuz" Buzby. Smash 64 was won by Josh Brody over Prince. There were also smaller Super Smash Bros. Brawl and Wii U side events, respectively won by Hunter "Player-1" Rogers over Will "Lain" Vetter and Brenden "ShyDude" King over "AFMbot".

=== 2020 cancellation ===
The Big House cancelled its 2020 tournament in July due to the COVID-19 pandemic. Tournament organizers later announced an online tournament for December 2020. The tournament was again cancelled after they received a cease and desist letter from Super Smash Bros. publisher Nintendo. Nintendo took concern with the tournament's plans to use an emulator that enables netplay and matchmaking for Melee but requires use of a ripped copy of the game, citing piracy concerns.

=== 2022–2024 ===
The Big House returned to an offline format for its tenth iteration, held on October 7–9, 2022. at the Huntington Place in Detroit as part of the Nintendo-sponsored Panda Cup. Melee was won by Masaya "aMSa" Chikamoto over Joseph "Mango" Marquez, marking the first time "aMSa" and a Yoshi player won a major tournament in the game's competitive lifespan; Cody "iBDW" Schwab, Zain Naghmi and Miles "Soonsay" Foster qualified for the Melee bracket of the Panda Cup Finale. Ultimate was won by Michael "Riddles" Kim over Paris "Light" Ramirez; Ramirez, Gavin "Tweek" Dempsey and Antony "MuteAce" Hoo qualified for the Ultimate bracket of the Panda Cup Finale. Smash 64 was won by Josh Brody over Keanu "OJ" Betancourt. As with the previous tournament, there were smaller Brawl and Wii U side events, respectively won by Christina "Chia" Korsak over "Merrick" and "Mr. Spikes" over "Arico". On July 9, 2024, the organizers announced that the series would be placed on an indefinite hiatus.

== Events ==
| Event | Dates | Venue | Location |
|---|---|---|---|
| The Big House | October 22, 2011 | University of Michigan | Ann Arbor, Michigan |
| The Big House 2 | October 6-7, 2012 | University of Michigan | Ann Arbor, Michigan |
| The Big House 3 | October 12-13, 2013 | University of Michigan | Ann Arbor, Michigan |
| The Big House 4 | October 4-5, 2014 | Sheraton DTW Hotel | Romulus, Michigan |
| The Big House 5 | October 2-4, 2015 | Adoba Hotel Dearborn | Dearborn, Michigan |
| The Big House 6 | October 7-9, 2016 | Edward Hotel & Convention Center | Dearborn, Michigan |
| The Big House 7 | October 6-8, 2017 | Cobo Center | Detroit, Michigan |
| The Big House 8 | October 5-7, 2018 | Cobo Center | Detroit, Michigan |
| The Big House 9 | October 4-6, 2019 | TCF Center | Detroit, Michigan |
| The Big House 10 | December 4-6, 2020 (cancelled) | Virtual | Virtual |
| The Big House 10 | October 7-9, 2022 | Huntington Place | Detroit, Michigan |
| The Big House 11 | October 20-22, 2023 | Huntington Place | Detroit, Michigan |
