= AMSa =

Japanese esports player (born 1991)

aMSa
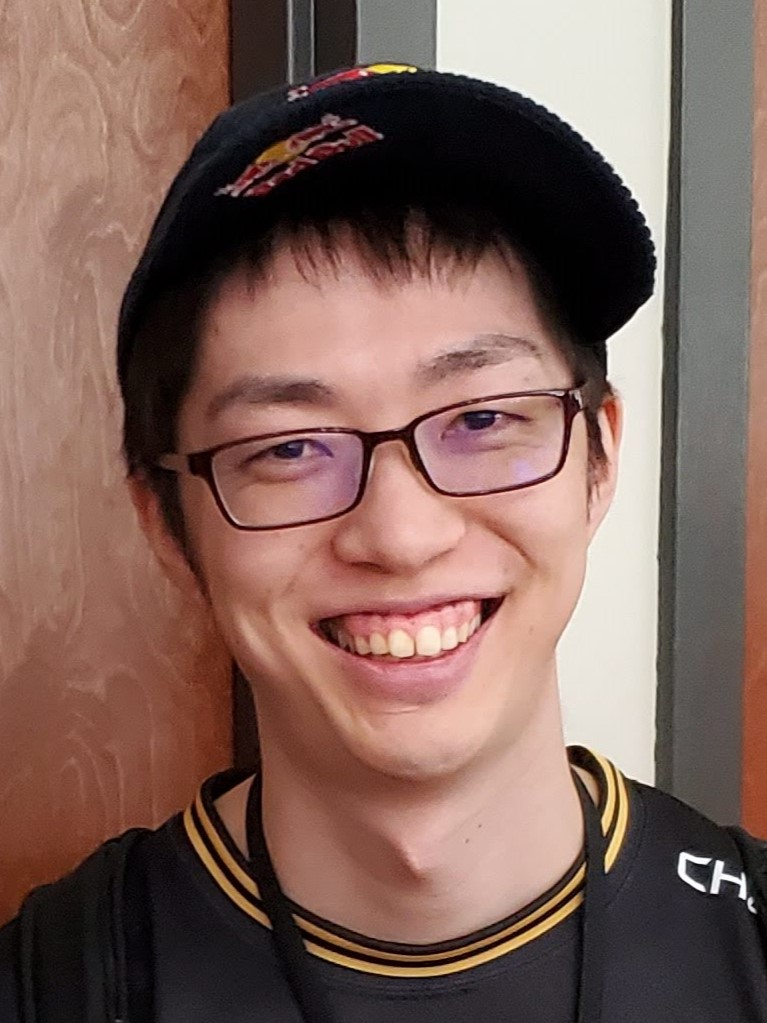
- Chikamoto in 2023

Personal information
- Name: Masaya Chikamoto
- Born: October 27, 1991 (age 35); Hyōgo Prefecture, Japan

Career information
- Game: Super Smash Bros. Melee
- Playing career: 2013–present

Team history
- 2014–2023: VGBootCamp
- 2019–present: Red Bull
- 2023: Golden Guardians
- 2023–present: I-FREEK Mobile

Career highlights and awards
- (3 majors won): The Big House champion (2022); Apex champion (2022); Scuffed World Tour champion (2022)

Twitch information
- Channel: aMSaYoshi
- Followers: 58,200
- Last updated: February 2026

Masaya Chikamoto (Japanese: 近本 昌也, Hepburn: Chikamoto Masaya; born October 27, 1991), better known by his alias aMSa (あむさ, Amusa), is a Japanese professional Super Smash Bros. Melee player. He is known for being the only top 10 player to play Yoshi, the undisputed best Melee Yoshi solo main in the entire world, and the first player from Asia to win a Melee supermajor. In 2022, he was ranked the second best player in the world after winning major tournaments Apex and The Big House. Most recently, he was ranked the 23rd best player in the world in SSBMRank 2025.

== Career ==
Chikamoto was born in Hyōgo Prefecture, Japan, on October 27, 1991. He stated that he has been a fan of Yoshi since his childhood and that, since the release of Super Smash Bros. Melee, Yoshi was his favorite character. For a time, Yoshi was considered to be a very weak character in competitive play, being ranked as low as the fourth worst character in the game for a time. Chikamoto started his professional career in 2013, having decent results, including winning a game against Mew2King, ranked third in the world at the time. In 2014, he finished ninth place at Apex and, next year, finished fifth. In 2021, due to Chikamoto's performances, Yoshi went on to be considered the tenth best character in the game, out of a total of twenty-six characters.

In February 2019, Chikamoto signed with Red Bull. He moved to Vancouver, Canada, in 2022, to compete in more North American tournaments. On October 10, 2022, he won his first major tournament, The Big House 10, after beating Mang0; this was considered by many to be the most difficult tournament to win in the game's history due to the amount of top players that were in attendance. This was the first time a player had won a major tournament using only Yoshi in the history of Melee. By the end of the year, he also won majors Apex and Scuffed World Tour, and was considered the second best Melee player as ranked by SSBMRank. In March 2023, Chikamoto joined esports organization Golden Guardians. He stopped working for Golden Guardians after they disbanded their roster of Melee players on November 30, 2023.
