= Glutonny =

French professional Super Smash Bros. player

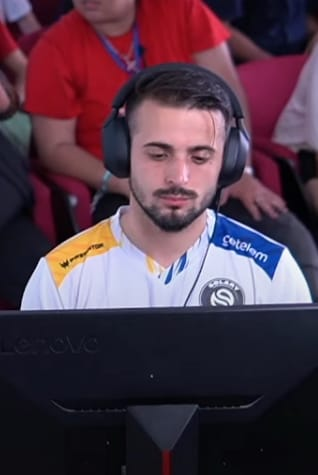
- Glutonny in 2025 playing at Super Smash Bros. Ultimate tournament "Tempest" in Spain, Bilbao

Personal information
- Name: William Belaïd
- Born: June 1, 1995 (age 31)
- Nationality: French

Career information
- Games: Super Smash Bros. Brawl; Super Smash Bros. for Wii U; Super Smash Bros. Ultimate
- Playing career: 2009–present

Team history
- 2018–2019: orKs Grand Poitiers
- 2019–present: Solary

Career highlights and awards
- (6 majors won): Albion 4 champion (2019); Pound champion (2022); Tera champion (2023); Ultimate Fighting Arena champion (2023); UltCore Second champion (2024); Battle of BC champion (2025)

William Belaïd (born June 1, 1995), commonly known as Glutonny, is a French professional Super Smash Bros. player. He is the highest ranked Super Smash Bros. Ultimate player from Europe. In Super Smash Bros. for Wii U, he was ranked the 70th best player in the world of all time. In Ultimate, he was ranked 14th and 8th best in the world for the first and second halves of 2019, respectively. He also was ranked 5th in 2023. In April 2022 he won Pound 2022, becoming the first European player to win a major Ultimate tournament outside Europe.

Glutonny has used Wario as his primary character in all three Smash Bros. titles in which he has competed; he was considered the best Wario in Europe in Super Smash Bros. Brawl, the best Wario in the world in Smash for Wii U, and contends for best Wario in the world in Ultimate.

== Career ==
=== Super Smash Bros. Brawl ===
Glutonny began competing in Smash at age 13, alongside his brother. His first Smash competition was Bushido Impact 8, a 105-participant Super Smash Bros. Brawl event held in Paris in February 2009. He took 2nd place, using Wario and Solid Snake. He competed in a number of small French events, with his first win coming at Bushido Nibai Impact in April 2009. Glutonny credits prominent French player Nassim "Leon" Laib for introducing him to the French competitive community. After losing to Leon in the finals of a tournament, Leon encouraged Glutonny to compete in further events and showed him the forums where registrations for French tournaments were held. Glutonny also believes that defeating Leon at Bushido Brawl Impact in 2010 was the beginning of his own rise to prominence. Glutonny went on to win that event, defeating Canadian player Elliot "Ally" Carroza-Oyarce in the grand finals. In 2012, he traveled to New Jersey in the United States to compete in SKTAR.

=== Super Smash Bros. for Wii U ===
Super Smash Bros. for Wii U released in Europe in November 2014, but Glutonny would not achieve notable results in the title until 2016. In February of that year, he took 2nd in the Smash for Wii U competition at Cannes Winter Clash, a French multi-esport tournament. In September he tied for 5th at a Dutch tournament, Syndicate 2016, using Wario and Captain Falcon. He took 3rd place in Smashdown World in November, where he was eliminated by Jason "ANTi" Bates in loser's side finals. The pair had fought earlier in the competition as well, in a match that Shoryuken's Sam Foxall considered one of the best matches of 2016.

In February 2017, Glutonny tied for 9th at a Swedish tournament, BEAST 7. In March, he traveled to Santa Ana, California to compete in 2GGC: Civil War, the most talent-heavy Smash for Wii U tournament held to date, and tied for 65th. In July he won the British tournament Albion 2, and won Respawn 5 in Germany a month later. He took 3rd in Syndicate 2017 in September. In January 2018, Glutonny won the Danish tournament Valhalla, using Wario, Cloud Strife, and Donkey Kong. He won Deflagration, held in Strasbourg, the following month. Midwest Mayhem 11 in Chicago paid for flights to their event for the winners of several European tournaments, and Glutonny secured one of the flights with his win at Valhalla. He tied for 9th at the tournament, which was held in March. In April, he signed with esports organization orKs Grand Poitiers. In May he tied for 13th at Get On My Level 2018, held in Ontario. He took 3rd at Glitch 5, in Laurel, Maryland, one of the last Smash for Wii U tournaments before Ultimate's release.

In Panda Global's ranking of the 100 best Super Smash Bros. for Wii U players of all time, Glutonny was ranked 70th.

=== Super Smash Bros. Ultimate ===
The release of Ultimate saw an increase in the number of people entering and watching tournaments, leading to an increase in available prize money compared with Smash for Wii U. As a result, Glutonny was able to leave his job and pursue competitive Smash Bros. full-time. In the first half of 2019, Glutonny asserted himself as Europe's best player, winning every tournament he entered in his home continent except for one, Stunfest 2019, where he took 2nd. In January, Glutonny won Valhalla II, the first large Ultimate tournament held in Europe. During the tournament, he defeated elite Super Smash Bros. Melee player William "Leffen" Hjelte in a reverse sweep. ESPN remarked that "many members of the Smash community hailed it as the most entertaining high-level Smash Ultimate set so far." Following his victory at Valhalla II, Glutonny departed orKs Grand Poitiers and signed with French esports organization Solary, which gave him the funding to travel to tournaments held outside of Europe. In February, he traveled to Oakland, California for Genesis 6, and tied for 17th. In March, he took 3rd place at Smash Ultimate Summit, an invitational tournament that he was invited to after winning a fan vote. In March he returned to California for 2GG: Prime Saga, where he tied for 9th, and in June he tied for 5th at Community Effort Orlando 2019. In early July, Glutonny won Albion 4, the first major Smash Ultimate tournament held in Europe. In the grand finals, he lost the first set 3–1 to Samuel "Dabuz" Buzby, before beating him by the same score in the bracket reset to win the event. Although he won one major and placed well in others, Glutonny attended only four of the first eleven major tournaments, and was ranked 14th in the inaugural Panda Global Rankings Ultimate, which covered events from the beginning of competitive Smash Ultimate through Albion 4. He was the highest ranked player from Europe.

Glutonny continued his dominance over European competition in the second half of 2019, losing only two tournaments held on his home continent, both to Mexican player Leonardo "MkLeo" López Pérez. At the end of July, Glutonny took 4th place at Smash Factor 8, held in Cholula, Mexico. The following month he placed 3rd at Evo 2019 in Las Vegas, the largest tournament by number of entrants in the Smash Bros. franchise's history, then tied for 5th at SwitchFest 2019 and 9th at Mainstage. In October he took 2nd at Ultimate Fighting Arena 2019 in France, one of the two European tournaments he lost to MkLeo, then won Syndicate 2019 in the Netherlands. November saw him take 2nd at the other European tournament he lost to MkLeo, Vienna Challengers Arena 2019. He closed out the year tying for 5th at 2GG Kongo Saga. In the Panda Global Rankings for the latter half of 2019, Glutonny rose to 8th in the world. He was once again the highest ranked player from Europe.

Glutonny began 2020 by winning Valhalla III, then tied for 7th at Genesis 7 at the end of the month. In February, he tied for 17th at Frostbite 2020. In early March, Panda Global Rankings suspended the 2020 competitive season due to the COVID-19 pandemic. Several tournaments transitioned to online play. In April, Glutonny tied for 9th at The Quarantine Series: Minor Tournament 1, a 5,000 participant online event. However, later that month he would fail to make the top 50 in Pound Online, and tied for 97th in the 128-player invitation The Quarantine Series: Major Tournament 1 in early May.

At the start of 2022, Glutonny placed 5th at Glitch: Infinite and Smash Ultimate Summit 4, as well as 9th at Collision 2022. In April, however, he achieved a string of impressive wins and high placements. At Genesis 8, he eliminated Edgar "Sparg0" Valdez, who had been seen as the favorite to win the tournament, en route to a 2nd place finish. The following weekend, at Pound 2022, he managed to take 1st place, winning two sets over Genesis 8 winner MkLeo in the process. With his win at Pound 2022, Glutonny became the first European to ever win a major tournament outside of Europe in a Smash Bros. title besides Melee.

=== Wario ===
Across all three Smash Bros. titles that he's competed in, Glutonny has consistently used Wario as his main character. According to the Panda Global Rankings and to writers covering competitive Smash, he was considered the best Wario player in Europe in Super Smash Bros. Brawl, the best Wario in the world in Super Smash Bros. for Wii U, and is a contender for the best Wario in the world in Ultimate.

He gravitated towards Wario because of the character's superior aerial mobility. In an interview with Canal+, Glutonny explained that while Wario does not have the best attack options in the game, he has a large number of viable options, and he can get anywhere on the map that he needs to be. In another interview he explained that in addition to Wario's mobility, the character is highly fluid, allowing Glutonny to create combos on the fly. Between that and the character's motorbike being a potent projectile weapon, Wario "has all the tools in order to counter every game style". In 2017, he noted in an interview that Wario was weaker in Smash for Wii U than he was in Brawl, and that as a result Glutonny had to change his playstyle and do extensive testing to find which techniques worked in the new game.

Glutonny's gaming handle was inspired by his use of Wario as well as by the character Gluttony from Fullmetal Alchemist. He reasoned that Gluttony eats everything, including people and inanimate objects, and since Wario also eats everything, it was a fitting name.

== See also ==
- Glutonny on Twitch
- Glutonny's channel on YouTube
