= Maister (gamer) =

Mexican professional Super Smash Bros. player

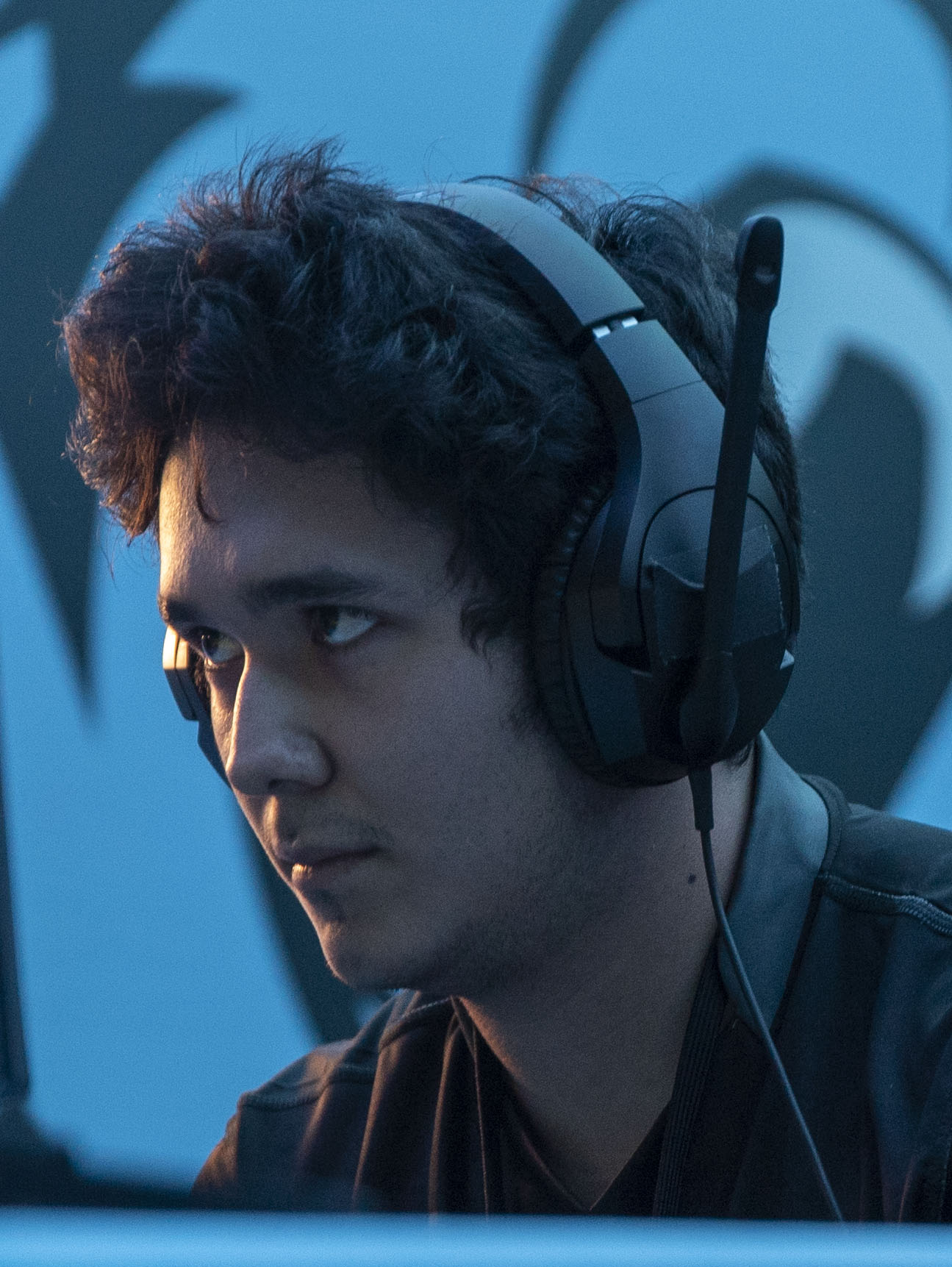
- Maister at Frostbite 2020

Personal information
- Name: Enrique Hernández Solís
- Born: March 3, 2000 (age 26)
- Nationality: Mexican

Career information
- Games: Super Smash Bros. for Wii U Super Smash Bros. Ultimate
- Playing career: 2017–present

Team history
- 2018–2019: Sinai Village
- 2018–2019: Team Killjoystick
- 2019: Anáhuac Esports
- 2019: Nevermore
- 2020–2022: Spacestation Gaming
- 2022: Moist Esports
- 2022: Ratatin Gaming
- 2022-present: Luminosity Gaming

Career highlights and awards
- Super Smash Bros. Ultimate (1 major won): OH-BAI-TOH-RI 2 champion (2025)

Enrique Hernández Solís (born March 3, 2000), also known as Maister, is a Mexican professional Super Smash Bros. player. He was previously considered the best Mr. Game & Watch player in Super Smash Bros. Ultimate, having achieved outstanding results with the character. He was ranked as the sixth best Super Smash Bros. Ultimate player in the world in the Panda Global rankings for the second half of 2019.

== Career ==
=== Super Smash Bros. for Wii U ===
Maister's interest in video game competitions came after he watched Best Player, a television film about a fictional tournament with a large prize, which led him to check if any such tournaments were held for Super Smash Bros. games in Mexico. He began competing in Super Smash Bros. for Wii U in 2017, roughly three years after the game's release. His first appearance in a major tournament was at Smash Factor 6, in August of that year. In January 2018 he tied for 13th place at GENESIS 5, before winning his first tournament, Combo Breaker 2018, in May. In October, Maister announced on Twitter that he had jointly signed with esports organizations Sinai Village and Team Killjoystick.

In the Panda Global Rankings 100, a ranking of the 100 best Super Smash Bros. for Wii U players of all time, Maister was ranked 81st.

=== Smash Ultimate ===
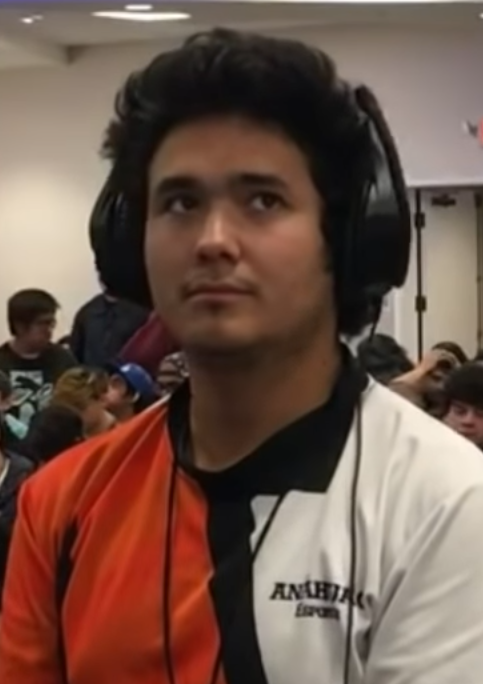
Maister at 2GG Kongo Saga in 2019

Super Smash Bros. Ultimate was released in December 2018. Maister did not travel to many tournaments in the first six months after the game's release. He placed third at a minor tournament in March 2019, Full Bloom 5, before securing his first win in Ultimate at Combo Breaker 2019, for a second consecutive Combo Breaker title. These results were not enough for Maister to secure a spot in the inaugural Panda Global Rankings Ultimate (PGRU), which covered the first half of 2019. In July, Maister announced that he had left Sinai Village, and later that month announced that he had been sponsored by the esports team of Anáhuac University. Under the arrangement, the university would gave Maister a scholarship as well as money for travel to Smash events.

Maister attended a much larger number of events in the second half of 2019, finishing within the top 24 in every tournament he attended, and securing several high placements. In July he took third place at Smash Factor 8, which was held in Mexico. He tied for 17th at Evo 2019, then tied for 5th at Super Smash Con 2019, both in August. In September he tied for 17th at another major tournament, Mainstage 2019. In September, esports organization Nevermore announced that they had signed Maister. He and the organization would part ways less than three months later.

His strongest month came in October, which he started by winning Little Big House 5, then placing third at The Big House 9. He defeated the eventual winner of the tournament, Sota "Zackray" Okada, in winner's semi-finals before being eliminated by Zackray in a rematch in loser's finals. In the latter half of the month Maister won 2GG: Nightmare on Smashville, which secured him the final open spot at the Smash Ultimate Summit 2 invitational tournament. He would go on to finish fourth at Summit 2. He would finish off the year with a third-place finish at 2GG: Kongo Saga. Based on his string of high placings at major tournaments, Maister went from being unranked in the previous season to being ranked the 6th best Smash Ultimate player in the world in the Fall 2019 Panda Global Rankings Ultimate.

Maister continued his string of top-24 showings in early 2020. He tied for 7th at Let's Make Big Moves 2020, tied for 17th at Glitch 8, and tied for 5th at Genesis 7. In February, Maister signed with multi-esport organization Spacestation Gaming. Prior to being signed, Maister was the highest ranked player without an organization. Shortly after being signed, he took 2nd at Frostbite 2020, losing in the grand finals to fellow Mexican player Leonardo "MKLeo" López Pérez.

Due to the COVID-19 pandemic, most of the tournaments scheduled for the first half of 2020 were canceled or moved online. At the end of April, Maister tied for 9th at Pound Online. Weeks later he tied for 13th out of 8,192 participants at the Hungrybox-organized The Box tournament.

=== Mr. Game & Watch ===
In the Super Smash Bros. franchise, players control one of a large cast of characters drawn from other games. Maister uses Mr. Game & Watch, which he was drawn to because of its physical expressiveness, telling an interviewer in 2020 "When I was a kid, I thought, 'Oh, this character has no face,' He has no voice, either. It's just beep, boop, and that's it. I thought that was cool."

In Super Smash Bros. for Wii U, Mr. Game & Watch was considered "low tier", or one of the weakest characters available for selection. In Super Smash Bros. Ultimate, while Mr. Game & Watch was still considered low-tier at the time of Maister's Combo Breaker 2019 win, the Smash community eventually realized that the character had become significantly stronger. Maister began seeing strong criticism on social media towards both the character and himself after placing highly at events, with some of that criticism claiming that Maister's success was entirely due to the character he played. At Smash Ultimate Summit 2, several top competitors were hooked up to polygraph machines and asked if Maister deserved his invitation. Ezra "Samsora" Morris, then the fourth-ranked Ultimate player in the world, answered no, while another top player, Eric "ESAM" Lew, triggered the polygraph when he answered yes. While Maister claimed that he did not mind criticism of the character, and acknowledged that Mr. Game & Watch was annoying to play against, he struggled to deal with the attacks leveled against him personally, eventually choosing to reduce the time he spent on social media.

== Personal life ==
Maister was born March 3, 2000. He attended Anáhuac University for four semesters before pausing his courses due to the COVID-19 pandemic, and was previously part of the university's esports team.
