= Dabuz =

American professional esports player

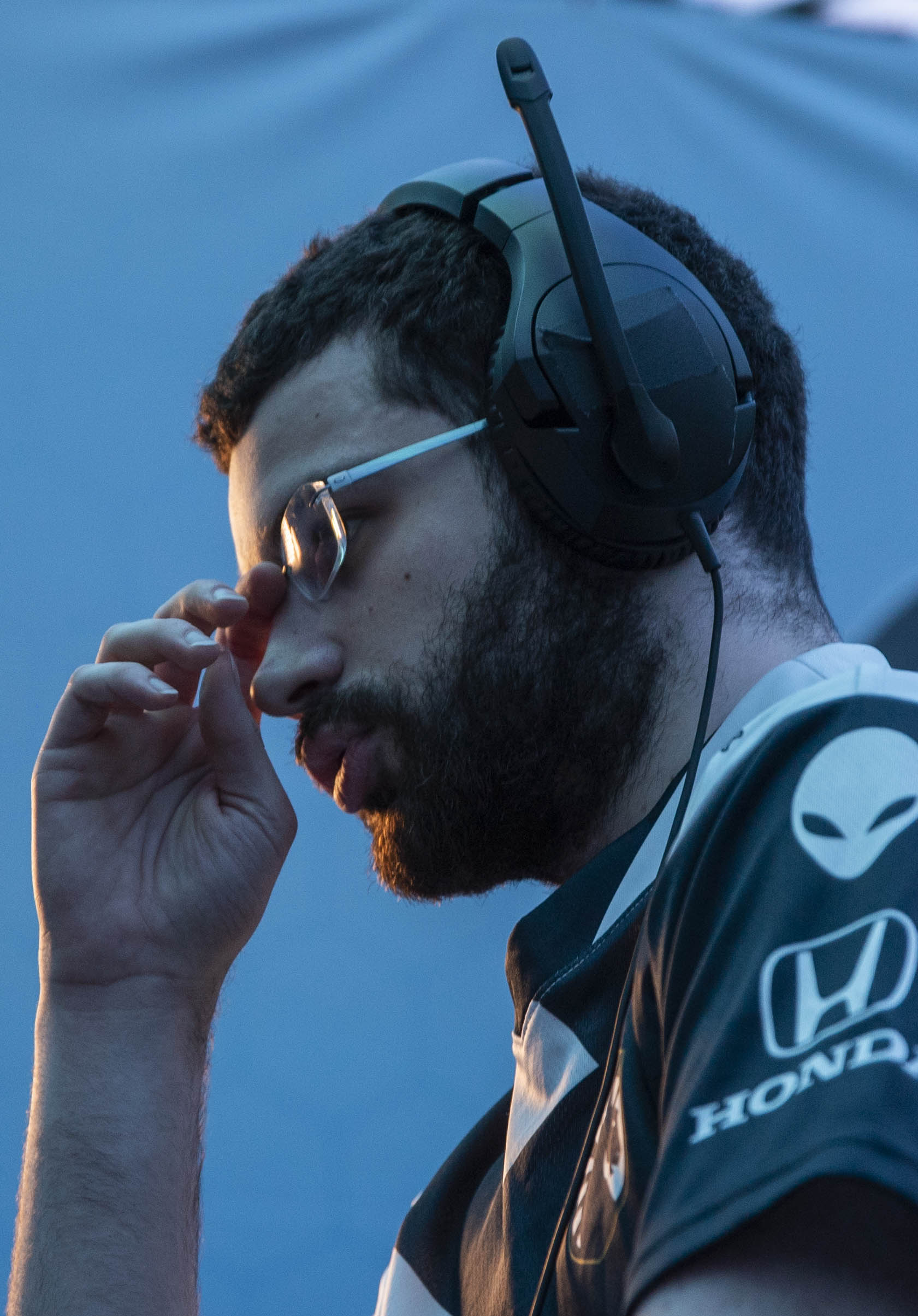
- Dabuz at Frostbite 2020

Personal information
- Name: Samuel Robert Buzby
- Born: August 7, 1993 (age 33)

Career information
- Games: Super Smash Bros. Brawl; Super Smash Bros. for Wii U Super Smash Bros. Ultimate
- Playing career: 2009–present

Team history
- 2016: Dream Team
- 2016 - 2017: Renegades
- 2018 - 2019: Gravity Gaming
- 2019 - 2025: Team Liquid

Career highlights and awards
- Super Smash Bros. for Wii U (7 majors won): 2GGC: Civil War champion (2017); 2GGC: ARMS Saga champion (2017); The Big House champion (2017); Frostbite champion (2018); Smash Sounds champion (2018); Super Smash Con champion (2019); Community Effort Orlando champion (2023)

Samuel Robert Buzby (born August 7, 1993), also known as Dabuz, is an American professional Super Smash Bros. player. In Super Smash Bros. for Wii U, he won several major tournaments and was ranked between 3rd and 6th best player in the world throughout the game's competitive history. In Super Smash Bros. Ultimate, he was ranked 7th and 9th best for the first and second halves of 2019, respectively.

Dabuz primarily used Olimar in Super Smash Bros. Brawl. In Super Smash Bros. for Wii U, he switched to Rosalina and Luma as his primary character, with Olimar as his secondary. In Ultimate, he uses Rosalina as a primary, and Olimar and Min Min as secondaries.

== Career ==
=== Super Smash Bros. Brawl ===
Dabuz began competing in Smash with Super Smash Bros. Brawl. His parents were initially reluctant to let him leave Long Island to compete, and Dabuz would occasionally lie to them about his whereabouts to attend tournaments. However, after winning $3,000 at an event held by Major League Gaming in 2009, he was able to convince his family that competing in Smash was a valid pursuit. Despite this, his ability to travel for competitions was severely limited. In January 2012 he finished tied for 13th at Apex 2012, a major tournament held at Rutgers University in New Jersey. He tied for 7th at Apex the following year. In June 2012 he traveled to Canada and won Impulse 2012.

Dabuz used Olimar as his primary character in Brawl.

=== Super Smash Bros. for Wii U ===
Super Smash Bros. for Wii U was released in November 2014, and Dabuz immediately began having strong showings in tournaments. He took second at APEX 2015 in February, third in Community Effort Orlando 2015 in June, and 5th at Evo 2015 in July. In August he signed with esports organization Vanquish Gaming, as their first Smash player. He would go on to take 2nd at Paragon Los Angeles 2015 in September, then 3rd at The Big House 5 in October. He continued placing highly in 2016, taking 2nd at Genesis 3 in January, and tying for 9th at Pound 2016 in April. In the inaugural Panda Global Rankings, which ranked players based on their tournament results from Smash for Wii U's inception through May 2016, Dabuz was ranked 3rd, behind only Gonzalo "ZeRo" Barrios and Nairoby "Nairo" Quezada. In addition to the mathematical ranking, Panda Global polled 48 panelists, most of which were top players, to produce a companion "X-Factor" ranking. This ranking had Dabuz second, with Nairo third.

In June 2016, Dabuz won his first major Smash tournament when he took the title at Apex 2016. Later that month, he and fellow Smash player Jason "ANTi" Bates signed with esports organization Dream Team. During his time with Dream Team, Dabuz won another tournament, WTFox 2, placed third at CEO 2016, tied for 7th at Evo 2016, and took 2nd at Super Smash Con 2016. In August allegations surfaced that Dream Team was not paying their Smash players, and shortly afterwards both Dabuz and ANTi departed the organization. Dream Team later released a statement denying that they had not paid the duo, and claiming that both had mutually parted ways with the organization after receiving more lucrative offers following their performances at CEO 2016. Dream Team also claimed that they had picked up the players in anticipation of a Nintendo- and Twitch-sponsored tournament circuit which never materialized, and that it made little sense to field a Smash roster without that circuit. In early October, Dabuz signed with multi-esport organization Renegades, and finished out the year taking 5th at The Big House 5 and 9th at 2GGT: ZeRo Saga. In the second edition of the Panda Global Rankings, covering the latter half of 2016, Dabuz was ranked 4th, with Elliot "Ally" Carroza-Oyarce joining ZeRo and Nairo above Dabuz in the rankings.

Dabuz had a slow start to 2017, tying for 13th place at 2GGC: Genesis Saga, the first major tournament of the year. He then tied for 7th at Genesis 4 at the end of January. He took 4th at Frostbite 2017 in February and 2nd at a minor tournament, PAX Arena, which was held at PAX East 2017 in early March. At the end of March, Dabuz won his first premier-tier Smash tournament, 2GGC: Civil War, which had the greatest concentration of top players of any Super Smash Bros. for Wii U tournament held to date. He took 4th at CEO Dreamland in April, then tied for 9th at CEO 2017 in June. Dabuz retained his 4th best position in the Panda Global Rankings for the first half of 2017. Dabuz started the second half of 2017 off strong by winning 2GGC: ARMS Saga and tying for 7th at Evo 2017 and DreamHack Atlanta 2017, all in July. However, August proved more difficult, as he also had a disappointing showing at Super Smash Con 2017, finishing 33rd, and subsequently withdrew from Shine 2017, which was held at the end of the month. He took 4th at DreamHack Montreal in October, then tied for 9th at GameTyrant Expo 2017 and won The Big House 7, both in early October. Days after his Big House 7 win, he announced that he had departed Renegades. He finished out the year placing 5th at 2GGC: MKLeo Saga and 4th at the 2GG Championship. While he won two major tournaments, Dabuz also attended only eight of the fourteen major tournaments in the second half of the year, and fell to 6th place in the Panda Global Rankings.

Dabuz had a resurgence in early 2018, winning five tournaments in three months; PAX Arena at PAX South 2018 in January, Frostbite 2018 and XenoSaga XIII in February,^{11:50} and Midwest Mayhem 11 and Overclocked II in March.^{10:00}^{12:55} Of these, Frostbite 2018 was the only event considered a major in the Panda Global Rankings. He tied for 5th at a number of other major tournaments over the first half of the year; Genesis 5 in January, Get On My Level 2018 and MomoCon 2018 in May, and Smash 'N' Splash 4 in June. In mid-June, he announced that he had signed with Gravity Gaming on a short-term deal, which would allow him to attend the last Smash for Wii U tournaments held before the release of Super Smash Bros. Ultimate at the end of the year. He went on to finish 3rd at 2GG: Hyrule Saga in late June, 5th at CEO 2018 in July, and won Smash Sounds and Low Tier City 6 later the same month.^{30:40} In August he tied for 9th at EVO 2018 and Shine 2018, but also finished tied for 33rd at Super Smash Con 2018. He finished 2nd at DreamHack Atlanta 2018 in November, the last Smash for Wii U tournament he contested in 2018. Dabuz rose back to 3rd in the final Panda Global Rankings for Smash for Wii U, which covered much of 2018, behind Leonardo "MkLeo" López Pérez and Gavin "Tweek" Dempsey. In a separate ranking, the Panda Global Rankings 100, which listed the Top 100 Wii U players from the game's release through the release of Ultimate, Dabuz was ranked the 4th best player of all time behind ZeRo, Nairo, and MkLeo.

In August 2019, well after the release of Smash Ultimate, Dabuz won the Smash for Wii U tournament at Super Smash Con 2019.

Throughout Super Smash Bros. for Wii U, Dabuz used Rosalina and Luma as his primary character. As early as the first Panda Global Ranking in mid-2016, he was already considered the uncontested best player in the world with that character. By the end of 2016, Dabuz had begun using his main character from Super Smash Bros. Brawl, Olimar, as a frequent secondary. He would continue to utilize this duo throughout Smash for Wii U's competitive run. In a 2017 interview, Dabuz stated that the primary reason that he began using Olimar again was that the character fared well against Diddy Kong – considered one of the strongest characters early in the game's history – while it was an extremely difficult matchup for Rosalina.

=== Super Smash Bros. Ultimate ===
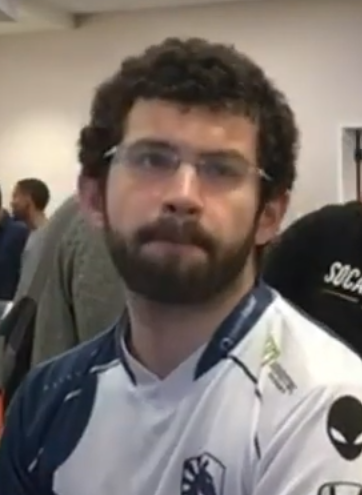
Dabuz at 2GG Kongo Saga in 2019

Super Smash Bros. Ultimate released at the end of 2018, and while Dabuz remained an elite competitor in the new game, he failed to reach the same heights in Ultimate as he did in Smash for Wii U. In the first half of 2019, the highest finish he achieved in a major tournament was 4th, at both Genesis 6 in February and CEO 2019 in June. He took 5th in two other major events, Smash N' Splash 5 and Pound 2019, and tied for 9th in MomoCon 2019, 2GG: Prime Saga, and Get On My Level 2019. His lowest showing at a major tournament was tied for 17th at Frostbite 2019, held in February. He also won a minor tournament, Thunder Smash, in May, winning $20,000. The first half of the year also saw him change sponsors. He announced his departure from Gravity at the end of February, and joined Team Liquid in early March. In the inaugural Panda Global Rankings Ultimate, Dabuz was ranked 7th, lower than his ranking at any point in Smash for Wii U competition.

July 2019 proved Dabuz's best month in Ultimate to date. He finished 2nd at Albion 4, held in London, then finished 2nd at Low Tier City 7, held in Texas a week later. He rounded out the month with 3rd-place finishes at Defend the North 2019 and Thunder Smash 2. In the six largest tournaments held during the second half of 2019, Dabuz took 2nd at The Big House 9, 5th at Shine 2019, tied for 9th in three other tournaments including Evo 2019, and tied for 49th at Super Smash Con 2019. He fell to 9th place in the Panda Global Rankings Ultimate for the latter half of the year.

Dabuz started 2020 by taking 2nd at Lets Make Big Moves, held in New York in early January. He tied for 5th at Glitch 8, then 9th at Genesis 7, both held later that month. In late February he took 5th at Frostbite 2020. Frostbite was Dabuz's last event before Panda Global Rankings suspended the 2020 competitive season due to the COVID-19 pandemic. Due to the pandemic, most of the tournaments scheduled for the first half of 2020 were cancelled or moved online. At the end of April, Dabuz took 2nd at Pound Online. Weeks later, he took 3rd out of 8,192 participants at the Hungrybox-organized The Box tournament. In June, he won the East Coast competition at Fights for Rights, a pair of tournaments held to raise funds for charities involved in the George Floyd protests.

Owing to changes to Rosalina that made her less effective in Ultimate than she was in Smash for Wii U, Dabuz initially returned to using Captain Olimar as his primary character, with Rosalina and Palutena as secondary characters. However, patch 3.1, released at the end of May 2019, singled out Olimar and Pichu, two of the smallest characters in the game, making them easier to hit. It also reduced the power of some of Olimar's attacks. Dabuz responded on Twitter that while one of Olimar's moves "got destroyed for no good reason" and the character was no longer elite, he knew the adjustments he needed to make and that he felt the character was still competitive. By the end of 2019, Dabuz was using both Rosalina and Olimar as co-main characters. After Min Min's release as a DLC fighter and part of Challenger Pack 6 on June 29, 2020, Dabuz started using her as a secondary character in addition to Olimar and Rosalina.

=== Playstyle ===
Dabuz utilizes a defensive playstyle; Min Min, Rosalina, and Olimar – the three characters he uses most – have mechanics that allow Dabuz to pressure his opponent from a safe distance, then quickly move in and attack when that pressure leads his opponent to make a mistake. Writing for the Panda Global Rankings in 2017, Adam Braham called his style "one of the most aggressively defensive play styles of any Smash Wii U player". Dabuz calls his style "passive aggressive".

He is also known for his extensive research and note-taking. He studies both character matchups and player matchups and consults his notes during tournaments. At CEO 2016, he asked for and was granted a pause in the match so he could review his notes using a laptop he brought on stage.

== Personal life ==
Dabuz graduated from Stony Brook University in 2017. He is of Jewish heritage.
