= Tweek (gamer) =

American professional esports player

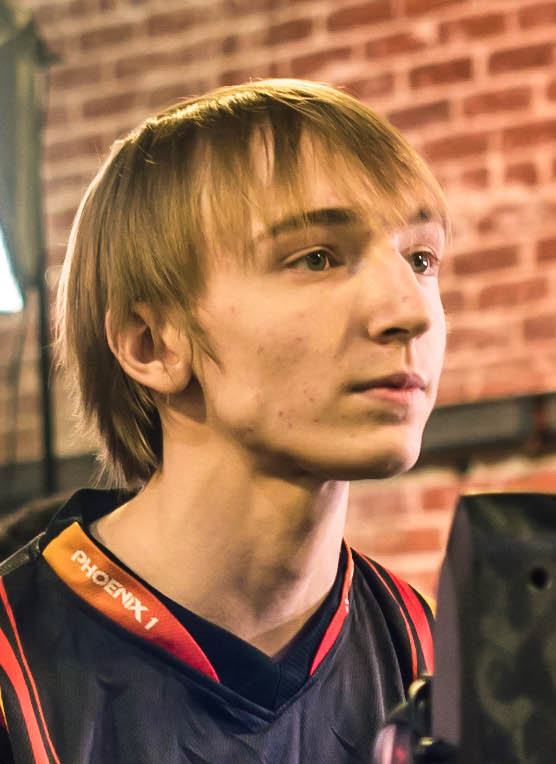
- Dempsey at 2GG Greninja Saga in 2017

Personal information
- Name: Gavin Dempsey
- Born: April 11, 1998 (age 28)

Career information
- Games: Super Smash Bros. for Wii U; Super Smash Bros. Ultimate
- Playing career: 2014–present

Team history
- 2017–2018: Phoenix1
- 2019–2023: Team SoloMid
- 2023-2025: Luminosity Gaming
- 2025-present: Team SoloMid

Career highlights and awards
- Super Smash Bros. for Wii U] (5 majors won): 2GGC: MkLeo Saga champion (2017); Enthusiast Gaming Live Expo 2018 champion; MomoCon champion (2018); 2GG: Hyrule Saga champion (2018); DreamHack Atlanta champion (2018); Super Smash Bros. Ultimate (12 majors won): 4x Let's Make Big Moves champion (2018, 2023, 2024); 2x Glitch champion (2019, 2020); 2x Get On My Level champion (2019, 2024); Low Tier City champion (2019); Frostbite champion (2019); Smash Ultimate Summit champion (2021); Port Priority champion (2022)

Gavin Dempsey (born April 11, 1998), also known as Tweek, is an American professional Super Smash Bros. player.

== Super Smash Bros. for Wii U ==
Tweek began competing in Super Smash Bros. events in 2014. Although he competed in a small number of Super Smash Bros. Melee events, including at Evo 2015, his first high-placed finishes were in Super Smash Bros. for Wii U. He was considered the best Bowser Jr. player in Smash for Wii U in 2015, though he would eventually retire the character in favor of Cloud Strife, the character whom he would use two years later in his first tournament win. In 2016 he had a number of strong showings at major tournaments, including taking third place at Glitch 2 and ninth at Genesis 4, and in February 2017 he was signed by esports organization Phoenix1. The organization, which had previously only fielded competitors in League of Legends, called him "one of the best up and coming talents in Smash". At the time, Tweek was ranked 17th in the Panda Global Rankings, considered the game's authoritative ranking of players.

Tweek's first tournament win would happen six months later when he defeated Gonzalo "ZeRo" Barrios, the then-best Super Smash Bros. for Wii U player in the world, to win Low Tier City 5. Tweek was on a strong run of form going into the tournament, having taken fourth place a month earlier at Evo 2017. His only other win at a major tournament in 2017 would come in November, where he won 2GGC: MkLeo Saga, which was considered a major Super Smash Bros. for Wii U tournament. In the Panda Global Rankings for the first and second half of 2017, Tweek climbed to 12th and then 5th, respectively.

The following year, Tweek put on a series of strong performances, including several tournament wins. He started the year with a second-place finish in Frostbite 2018, followed by wins at King of the Springs 3 and Enthusiast Gaming Live Expo 2018. By this time, he had transitioned to using Bayonetta increasingly in tournaments. Tweek announced in mid-May that he was no longer representing Phoenix1. As a free agent, he won MomoCon 2018 in May and 2GG: Hyrule Saga in June, both also considered major tournaments, then placed second at CEO 2018 in July. As a result of his strong performances, Tweek was ranked the second best Smash player for 2018 in the Panda Global Rankings, behind only Leonardo "MkLeo" López Pérez. By this time, Panda Global listed his main character as Bayonetta, with Cloud Strife and Donkey Kong as secondaries.^{11:10} Following the release of Super Smash Bros. Ultimate, Panda Global released a list of the 100 best players of all time for Super Smash Bros. for Wii U, which ranked Tweek 7th.

== Super Smash Bros. Ultimate ==
Super Smash Bros. Ultimate was released on December 7, 2018. The game was seen as sharing the "framework and DNA of Super Smash Bros for the Wii U", and Tweek transitioned from Wii U to Ultimate seamlessly, winning both Let's Make Moves and the Sky Ultimate Invitational in the game's first month. He followed those wins with a win at Glitch 6 in January. Shortly after Glitch, he was signed by esports organization TSM, the same organization that elite Melee player William "Leffen" Hjelte represented and that Wii U player ZeRo had represented prior to his retirement.

Genesis 6, which was held at the end of January, was Tweek's first major event after being signed by TSM, and was the first S-tier (supermajor) major Super Smash Bros. Ultimate tournaments in the new Panda Global Rankings Ultimate (PGRU). He finished in ninth place at the event, which was won by MkLeo. In February, Tweek defeated MkLeo to win Frostbite 2019. MkLeo was the top seed at Frostbite and was at the time considered the best Ultimate player in the world. Tweek was seen as MkLeo's main competitor for that title and one of the few people that could beat him. The finals of Frostbite 2019 became the first time that the two had played against one another in Ultimate, and Tweek's victory gave him a strong claim at being Ultimate's top player. It was also Tweek's first win at a PGRU major event. However, Tweek failed to qualify for the next major tournament, Smash Ultimate Summit, whose attendees were selected by a combination of fan vote and tournament placings. Tweek's last chance to secure an invitation was by winning Ultimate Nimbus in March, but Tweek was unable to make even semifinals of that event. MkLeo would go on to win Smash Ultimate Summit.

Tweek's next tournament wins came in May, where he won both Saints Gaming Live and Get On My Level 2019. Both Tweek and MkLeo had failed to win a tournament in several months (Tweek since Frostbite, Leo since Summit), and Get On My Level was considered a major tournament in the Panda Global Rankings, making Tweek's win especially important in the race to secure the top spot in the forthcoming inaugural Panda Global Rankings for Ultimate. These would be the last wins for Tweek during the first half of 2019; MkLeo beat Tweek in the finals of MomoCon 2019 at the end of May, and then win CEO 2019, which Tweek did not compete in. Tweek was ranked as the 2nd best Super Smash Bros. Ultimate player in the world in the inaugural Panda Global Rankings for Ultimate, which covered the first half of 2019, behind only MkLeo. In their analysis, Panda Global noted that while Tweek was one of only a small number of people to win major tournaments in Ultimate, there were portions of the year where he seemed to struggle around which character to play. They listed his main character as Wario, with Young Link, Wolf O'Donnell, and Roy as secondary characters.

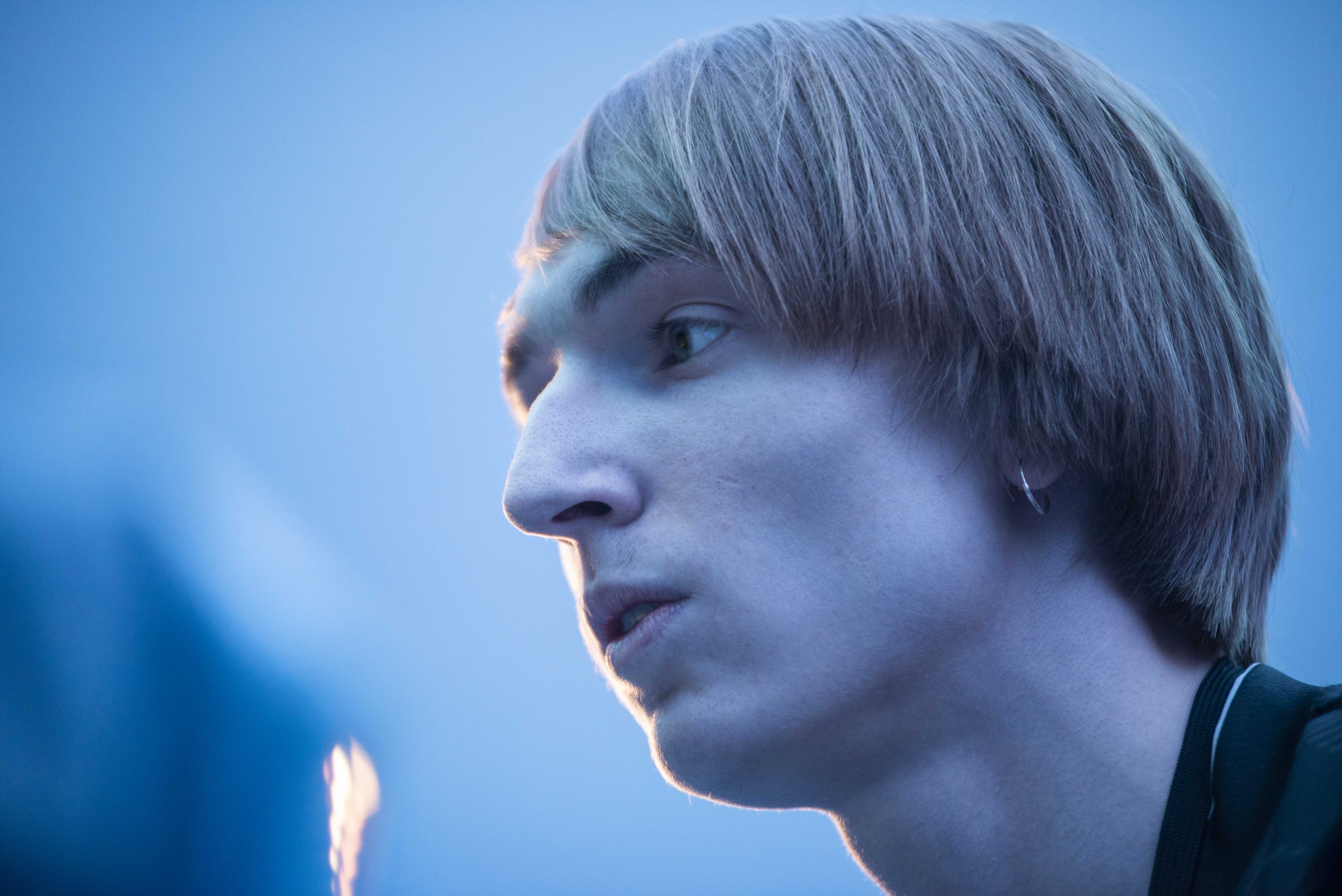
Tweek at Frostbite 2020

Throughout the second half of 2019, Tweek put on strong performances at several major tournaments, but won few of them. In July he won Low Tier City 7, a PGRU major, debuting Pokémon Trainer as his combatant. He made Pokémon Trainer his main character for the remainder of the year, with Wario and Joker as his secondaries. In August he took second at Evo 2019, falling to MkLeo. Evo 2019 was the largest tournament by number of participants in Smash Bros. franchise history. Over the rest of the year, he took second and third at two other premier tournaments, 2GG: Kongo Saga and Super Smash Con 2019, respectively, and won a minor tournament, Return to Yoshi's Island. However, his other results over this period were less strong, falling inside the top 8 but outside the top 4 in Shine 2019, Glitch 7, and Big House 9, and being eliminated in the first round of the 16-person invitational tournament Smash Ultimate Summit 2. At that event, he fell to fellow TSM player Leffen, with both players using Pokémon Trainer as their combatant. In November, Tweek exited DreamHack Atlanta in 13th place. At the end of the year, Tweek fell one spot in the Panda Global Rankings to third, behind MkLeo and Ezra "Samsora" Morris.

In the first major tournament of 2020, Let's Make Big Moves, Tweek exited tied for 25th. However, later that month, he would win Glitch 8, his first win at a PGRU major tournament since July 2019. At the end of the month, Tweek tied for 9th place at Genesis 7; the following month, Tweek would take third at Frostbite 2020, falling to MkLeo in the semifinals. Frostbite was Tweek's last event before Panda Global Rankings suspended the 2020 competitive season due to the COVID-19 pandemic.

Due to the COVID-19 pandemic, most of the tournaments scheduled for the first half of 2020 were cancelled or moved online. At the end of April, Tweek failed to make the top 50 at Pound Online. Weeks later, however, he took 2nd out of 8,192 participants at the Hungrybox-organized The Box tournament.

In August 2021, Tweek won in Smash Ultimate Summit 3 after beating MkLeo 3-0 twice using Diddy Kong, preventing MkLeo from winning his third Summit title in a row. They met again in the Grand Finals of Riptide 2021, where MkLeo came out on top. Tweek wouldn't make it to Grand Finals at a major tournament for the rest of 2021. He fell at 9th place at Low Tide City 2021, where he was knocked out of Losers' Bracket by Alexis "Goblin" Stennett, one of the few players to have a perfect winning record against Tweek. He placed 3rd at Port Priority 6, losing to Edgar "Sparg0" Valdez in Losers' Finals, and 5th at Mainstage 2021. He placed 17th at the Smash World Tour Championships in December, the last major tournament of the year, where he was defeated by Dominican player Carlos "Sonix" Pérez.

In 2022, Tweek placed 5th at the Smash Ultimate Summit 4 invitational. He was defeated by Japanese player Naoto "ProtoBanham" Tsuji, who subsequently knocked MkLeo out of the tournament as well. At Collision 2022 in March, Tweek defeated MkLeo in Losers' Finals for the first time since Ultimate Summit 3, though he fell to Sparg0 in Grand Finals. This reaffirmed the perception of Tweek as one of the best in the world, alongside MkLeo and Sparg0. A month later, though, he placed 33rd at premier tournament Genesis 8.
