= ZeRo =

Chilean esports player

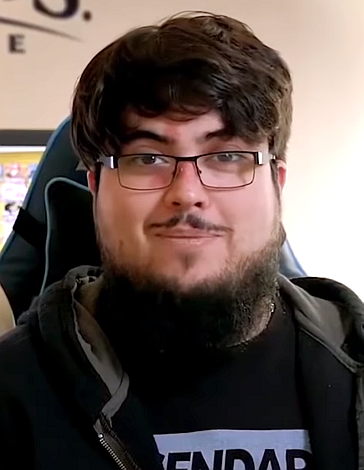
- ZeRo in 2019

Personal information
- Name: Gonzalo Raúl Barrios Castro
- Born: April 17, 1995 (age 31); Chillán, Chile

Career information
- Games: Super Smash Bros. Melee; Project M; Super Smash Bros. Brawl; Super Smash Bros. for Wii U; Super Smash Bros. Ultimate
- Playing career: 2006–2020

Team history
- 2012: vVv Gaming
- 2014: Clash Tournaments
- 2015–2018: Team SoloMid
- 2018–2020: Tempo Storm

Career highlights and awards
- Project M (3 majors won): Community Effort Orlando champion (2014); Zenith champion (2014); The Big House (2014); Super Smash Bros. for Wii U (23 majors won): 5x 2GGS champion (2017); 3x Community Effort Orlando champion (2015-2017); 2x The Big House champion (2015, 2016); Apex champion (2015); EVO champion (2015); Super Smash Con champion (2015); Genesis champion (2016); 2GGT: Abadango Saga champion (2016); KTAR XIX champion (2016); UGC Smash Open champion (2016); Frostbite champion (2017); DreamHack Austin 2017 champion; Royal Flush champion (2017); Smash 'N' Splash 3 champion (2017); Shine champion (2017); PAX Arena at PAX West 2017 champion (2017)

YouTube information
- Channel: ZeRoWondering
- Years active: 2012–2025
- Subscribers: 819 thousand
- Views: 365 million
- Last updated: February 2025

Gonzalo Raúl Barrios Castro (born April 17, 1995), known by his gamertag ZeRo, is a Chilean former professional Super Smash Bros. player and streamer. He was considered the best Super Smash Bros. for Wii U player in the world throughout his career, with a record-breaking 56 consecutive tournament wins in the game from November 2014 to October 2015, including high-profile tournaments such as EVO 2015 and The Big House 5. Prior to the release of Super Smash Bros. for Wii U, he was a top ranked Super Smash Bros. Brawl and Project M player. His best known characters are Diddy Kong in Super Smash Bros. for Wii U, Pit in Project M, Meta Knight in Brawl, and Fox in Melee.

ZeRo retired from professional competition in January 2018 to focus on streaming and "close the chapter" with Super Smash Bros. for Wii U. Following allegations of sexting two minors in 2014, ZeRo's sponsors cut ties with him in July 2020 due to his admission to the allegations. In September 2022, ZeRo settled a defamation lawsuit he had filed against one of his accusers in response to the allegations.

== Life and career ==
=== 2005–2011: Early life and Super Smash Bros. tournaments ===
ZeRo was born in Chillán in 1995. As a child, ZeRo was bullied and placed into a special education program in school. Due to his family's financial issues and his own anxiety, he dropped out of school for three years. During this time, ZeRo received a Nintendo GameCube and would play speedruns on Super Mario Sunshine, as well as Super Smash Bros. Melee with his older sister.

In 2006, ZeRo began competing in Melee tournaments in his Chilean hometown at a local game store. In the following years, ZeRo regularly traveled between Chile, Argentina, and the United States to compete in regional and international Smash tournaments and events.

In 2011, ZeRo's sister died at age 27 due to complications from a brain aneurysm.

=== 2011–2018: vVv Gaming and rise to professional Smash tournaments ===
Between 2011 and 2012, after competing in various local and regional Melee tournaments, ZeRo was sponsored by Los Angeles-based vVv Gaming. In 2012, he began competing in professional esports events including Apex, By early 2014, it was estimated that ZeRo was earning approximately US$40,000 a year from a combination of prize money, sponsorships, and Twitch streams.

ZeRo then qualified for the MLG Anaheim 2014 championship bracket and finished in 17th place. During this time, he was ranked by Melee it on Me as the 35th best Melee player in the world. In June 2014, he won the Super Smash Bros. for Wii U invitational at E3, moving up through the winner's bracket and defeating Hungrybox in the game's first-ever official tournament.

In November 2014, ZeRo criticized Diddy Kong's repetitive play style in Smash Bros. for Wii U, claiming that Diddy was "killing the game". However, ZeRo later retracted the statement and stated that Diddy Kong was his favorite character to play with, which eventually led to Diddy being his main character in tournaments.

At EVO 2015, ZeRo defeated Mr. R in the largest Smash for Wii U tournament to date. In the following month, Team SoloMid announced ZeRo as the second player in their Super Smash Bros. division.

At The Big House 5, ZeRo faced off in the grand finals against Team Liquid's Nairo. Despite a narrow escape from losses in the early tournament and a loss during the first set versus Nairo, ZeRo ended with a 3–2 win in the second set.

In MLG World Finals 2015, ZeRo defeated Nakat, StaticManny, Ally, and ESAM, moving on to challenge Nairo for the winner's bracket grand finals. There, Nairo took two sets off of ZeRo, ending ZeRo's reign at 56 consecutive victories.

ZeRo suffered from a growth on his middle finger in early 2016 that required surgical removal, and prevented him from playing Smash for several months.

=== 2018–present: Partnerships, sexual misconduct allegations and cut ties ===
In November 2018, ZeRo simultaneously announced his return to professional competition for Super Smash Bros. Ultimate and his signing to the Tempo Storm esports team. ZeRo announced a year later that he had signed an exclusive streaming rights deal with Facebook.

On July 3, 2020, ZeRo announced that he would be retiring from professional competition following allegations of sending sexual messages to minors when he was 19, and that he would also be ending all of his sponsorships. This includes an incident in 2014, where ZeRo allegedly asked "Katie", a 14-year-old girl at the time, to masturbate with ice and to take pictures. ZeRo later made a statement on YouTube, saying he was sorry and was seeking therapy. The following day, Tempo Storm announced that they would be severing ties with ZeRo, with Facebook following suit on July 5, and Twitch on July 23. When Inven Global asked the team's CEO, Andrey "Reynad" Yanyuk, if he saw "a world in which ZeRo is able to rehabilitate himself and potentially re-join Tempo Storm in some capacity", he responded:

"I don't know, I don't like to speculate about the future. I just take things one day at a time, you know? I think ZeRo is a very different person today than he was when he wrote some Skype messages at 19 years old. I think he's had a lot of personal growth over the past few years that I've personally seen, so I'm optimistic about his ability to recover."

After months of silence, on March 23, 2021, ZeRo's then ex-girlfriend Vanessa announced on Twitter that he had attempted suicide and was sent in for further care after being treated in a hospital. On April 26, 2021, ZeRo updated to the community that he successfully recovered from the hospital and has no intention to attempt suicide again. On November 16, 2021, ZeRo uploaded a video to YouTube, stating that he was returning to creating content and retracting his previous admission. On November 30, 2021, ZeRo sued his former roommate Jisu for defamation regarding four allegations she made against him in 2020. On September 9, 2022, ZeRo announced that a settlement had been reached in the lawsuit.

On October 19, 2024, on a YouTube livestream, ZeRo announced that he was engaged.

== Awards and honors ==
ZeRo was considered the third best Brawl player in the world by Clash Tournaments in the 2014 SSBBRank.

ZeRo was ranked as the best Smash for WiiU player in the world on all four editions of the Panda Global Rankings (PGR) prior to his retirement.

In 2016, ZeRo was featured in the Guinness Book of World Records Gamer's Edition for his 56 consecutive Smash tournament victories.

== Tournament placings ==
=== Super Smash Bros. Brawl ===
Tournament	Date	1v1 Placement	2v2 Placement	Partner
Torneo Nacional 2	January 8–9, 2011	1st	1st	Iori
Torneo Hawaiano	February 19, 2011	1st	—	—
Showdown II	July 23, 2011	1st	1st	Nekokatsu
The Spirit of Smash Tournament	August 20, 2011	1st	—	—
Tujo pasó Agosto 2011 iiiiesh!	August 27, 2011	1st	—	—
The Hedgehog's Lair	September 10, 2011	1st	—	—
Showdown III	October 29, 2011	1st	1st	Nekokatsu
PQDD	November 19, 2011	1st	—	—
Tujo Express	November 26, 2011	1st	—	—
Apex 2012 Practice Round Robin	December 31, 2011	1st	—	—
Apex 2012	January 6–8, 2012	17th	9th	Kadaj
Winter Shore Smashing	January 14, 2012	1st	—	—
Tujo Brawler	January 21, 2012	1st	—	—
Ryuuko's Got Talent	April 21, 2012	1st	—	—
Por eso la gente se va	May 19, 2012	1st	—	—
Neko Empire 3	June 16, 2012	1st	—	—
Karma Invierno	August 4, 2012	1st	—	—
FrikiGen Con 3	August 25, 2012	1st	—	—
Neko's Ranch or Empire?	August 31, 2012	1st	—	—
Torneo Dominguero del Rollo	September 16, 2012	1st	—	—
Neko's Fonda	September 21, 2012	1st	—	—
Neko Strikes Back!	October 13, 2012	1st	—	—
Forever [Censored] Slowpoke Tournament 2	November 3, 2012	1st	—	—
Haru wa Yakusoku	November 10, 2012	1st	—	—
My Waifu Asuna	November 17, 2012	1st	—	—
XSmash	December 22, 2012	1st	4th	Dabuz
Uprise 11	December 29, 2012	2nd	2nd	Anti
Collision VI	January 5, 2013	7th	3rd	quiKsilver
United 1	January 6, 2013	2nd	3rd	quiKsilver
Apex 2013	January 11–13, 2013	9th	13th	quiKsilver
Sa2vation	January 26, 2013	1st	2nd	Tantalus
KOTC	February 2, 2013	1st	—	—
Remix 3	February 9, 2013	1st	1st	FOW
Xanadu Games Harlem Shake Edition	February 23, 2013	3rd	1st	ESAM
Winter Brawl 7	February 23–24, 2013	3rd	—	—
Rescue 2	March 2, 2013	1st	3rd	Chibo
Outrage	March 9, 2013	1st	1st	Ally
René Descartes Tournament	March 16, 2013	1st	1st	Megu
Boku no Tournament	May 4, 2013	1st	1st	Kross
Erizo con Tuberculosis Tournament	May 25, 2013	—	1st	Rody
La Pocilga de los Pikmins III	July 6, 2013	1st	1st	Rody
Shockwave	July 20, 2013	1st	1st	Anti
Rescue 3	July 27, 2013	1st	3rd	Chibo
SKTAR 2	August 3–4, 2013	5th	4th	Ally
El Torneo de la Fa	August 10, 2013	1st	4th	Megu
La Fonda del Warén Tournament	September 19, 2013	1st	1st	Nekokatsu
La Jefa Me Dio Permiso Tournament	September 21, 2013	1st	1st	Snake
Showdown IV	October 26, 2013	1st	1st	Snake
Smashacre Frostbite	December 7–8, 2013	5th	—	—
Thanks for Playing 4	December 21, 2013	1st	—	—
Seagull Joe's Bad Karma @ Xanadu Games	December 22, 2013	1st	—	—
KTAR 8	December 28, 2013	2nd	3rd	Salem
Smash Factor 2	January 3–5, 2014	1st	1st	Mew2King
Forest Temple	January 11, 2014	1st	1st	FOW
Apex 2014	January 17–19, 2014	2nd	5th	Chib0
Shuffle V	February 22–23, 2014	1st	7th	Chibo
First Date	March 1, 2014	1st	1st	Izumi
Collision 9	March 15, 2014	1st	2nd	Vex Kasrani
KTAR 9	March 22, 2014	1st	3rd	Seagull Joe
Smash Brothers University 2.5	April 12–13, 2014	1st	—	—
WHOBO MLG	May 3–4, 2014	1st	2nd	Denti
Hitbox Arena Warm-Up Welcome	May 10, 2014	1st	—	—
Smash @ Xanadu Tuesday	May 13, 2014	1st	—	—
Super Smash Sundays East Coast # 4	May 18, 2014	2nd	—	—
SKTAR 3	May 31 – June 1, 2014	4th	4th	Vex Kasrani
Salt Lake Comic Con	September 4–6, 2014	1st	—	—
GUTS 3	September 19–21, 2014	1st	—	—

=== Super Smash Bros. Melee ===
Tournament	Date	1v1 Placement	2v2 Placement	Partner
Thanks for Playing 4	December 21, 2013	5th	—	—
Seagull Joe's Bad Karma @ Xanadu Games	December 22, 2013	7th	—	—
AGDQ 2014	January 5–11, 2014	4th	—	—
Shuffle V	February 22–23, 2014	13th	3rd	Nintendude
First Date	March 1, 2014	5th	—	—
Revival of Melee 7	March 8–9, 2014	17th	9th	Vex Kasrani
Collision 9	March 15, 2014	3rd	1st	Mew2King
Game Over VII	March 18, 2014	5th	—	—
KTAR 9	March 22, 2014	7th	1st	Mew2King
Xanadu Legends	April 5, 2014	4th	2nd	Bones
Smash Brothers University 2.5	April 12–13, 2014	7th	—	—
Fighters' Edge	April 26–27, 2014	5th	—	—
WHOBO MLG	May 3–4, 2014	4th	—	—
Smash @ Xanadu Tuesday	May 13, 2014	2nd	—	—
Super Smash Sundays East Coast # 4	May 18, 2014	1st	—	—
Smash @ Xanadu Tuesday	May 20, 2014	3rd	—	—
Pat's House 2	May 24–25, 2014	17th	7th	Westballz
SKTAR 3	May 31 – June 1, 2014	9th	5th	s0ft
Mayhem	June 7, 2014	7th	3rd	DEHF
SSS Lock-In	June 14–15, 2014	9th	3rd	S2J
MLG Anaheim 2014	June 20–22, 2014	17th	13th	DEHF
CEO 2014	June 27–29, 2014	17th	4th	ESAM
Kings of Cali 4	July 5–6, 2014	13th	5th	Westballz
EVO 2014	July 11–13, 2014	17th	5th	KoreanDJ
Gameguys Intergalactic Kegger	July 26–27, 2014	5th	—	—
Zenith 2014	August 2–3, 2014	7th	2nd	Axe
Mass Madness CE	August 23, 2014	5th	1st	Hax
Summer Jam 8	August 30–31, 2014	1st	—	—
Salt Lake Comic Con	September 4–6, 2014	1st	—	—
GamerByte	October 25, 2014	1st	—	—

=== Project M ===
Tournament	Date	1v1 Placement	2v2 Placement	Partner
Thanks for Playing 4	December 21, 2013	1st	1st	Salem
Seagull Joe's Bad Karma @ Xanadu Games	December 22, 2013	1st	—	—
KTAR 8	December 28, 2013	17th	—	—
Shuffle V	February 22–23, 2014	13th	1st	Denti
First Date	March 1, 2014	5th	—	—
Collision 9	March 15, 2014	4th	—	—
Smashing Grounds 5	March 20, 2014	3rd	—	—
KTAR 9	March 22, 2014	9th	2nd	Seagull Joe
Xanadu Legends	April 5, 2014	2nd	2nd	Seagull Joe
Smash Brothers University 2.5	April 12–13, 2014	2nd	5th	PB&J
Fighters' Edge	April 26–27, 2014	2nd	—	—
Infinity and Beyond 5	May 1, 2014	1st	1st	Denti
WHOBO MLG	May 3–4, 2014	1st	1st	Denti
Hitbox Arena Warm-Up Welcome	May 10, 2014	1st	—	—
Smash @ Xanadu Tuesday]	May 13, 2014	1st	—	—
Project M Showdown 3.02	May 17, 2014	1st	1st	ChuDat
Super Smash Sundays East Coast # 4	May 18, 2014	1st	—	—
Smash @ Xanadu Tuesday 5/20	May 20, 2014	1st	—	—
SKTAR 3	May 31 – June 1, 2014	9th	1st	Rolex
Mayhem]	June 7, 2014	2nd	1st	DEHF
Super Smash Sundays 6/8	June 8, 2014	3rd	1st	DEHF
CEO 2014	June 27–29, 2014	1st	2nd	Mew2King
EVO 2014 Day 2 Side Tournament	July 12, 2014	1st	—	—
Gameguys Intergalactic Kegger	July 26–27, 2014	1st	1st	Mew2King
Zenith 2014	August 2–3, 2014	1st	1st	Mew2King
Summer Jam 8	August 30–31, 2014	1st	—	—
Salt Lake Comic Con	September 4–6, 2014	1st	—	—
GUTS 3	September 19–21, 2014	1st	1st	Emukiller
The Big House 4	October 4–5, 2014	1st	1st	Mew2King
NorCal Regionals 2015	April 3–5, 2015	1st	—	—
MSS 1	July 25, 2015	1st	—	—

=== Super Smash Bros. Wii U ===
Tournament	Date	1v1 Placement	2v2 Placement	Partner
Super Smash Bros. Invitational	June 10, 2014	1st	—	—
Sky's Smash 4 Invitational	November 20–22, 2014	3rd	5th	Mr. R
UGC Biweekly #17	November 29, 2014	1st	1st	Tyrant
Triumph or Die 2014	November 30, 2014	1st	—	—
Super Smash Weekend June 12, 2014	December 6, 2014	1st	1st	Tyrant
Super Smash Saturdays Dec 20, 2014	December 20, 2014	1st	1st	Tearbear
UGC Biweekly #18	December 21, 2014	1st	1st	Xzax
Double Vegas Down Attack 5	December 22, 2014	1st	1st	Tyrant
SkillCon	December 26 – January 2, 2015	1st	—	—
UGC Smash v2.2 Road to Final Battle!	January 3, 2015	1st	1st	Tyrant
Warriors Path 1/4	January 4, 2015	1st	1st	Xzax
Clash Online Invitational Finals	January 11, 2015	1st	—	—
Double Vegas Down Attack 6	January 12, 2015	1st	1st	Xzax
Final Battle	January 17, 2015	1st	2nd	Tyrant
Smash 4 Worldwide	January 18, 2015	1st	—	—
Apex 2015	January 30 – February 1, 2015	1st	1st	Mew2King
COTU VI	February 7, 2015	1st	1st	Larry Lurr
Showdown VI	March 1, 2015	1st	—	—
Cyberzone 3/14	March 14, 2015	1st	1st	SS
The Gaming Zone 3/21	March 21, 2015	1st	1st	SS
Shockwave 22	March 27, 2015	1st	1st	Dabuz
Aftershock	March 28–29, 2015	1st	1st	Dabuz
Double Vegas Down Attack 8	March 30, 2015	1st	—	—
Come on and Ban #13	April 2, 2015	1st	—	—
NorCal Regionals 2015	April 3–5, 2015	1st	1st	Zex
MVG Sandstorm	April 18–19, 2015	1st	1st	Mew2King
Chokaigi 2015	April 25–26, 2015	1st	1st	Mew2King
Fire & Dice Thur #9	April 30, 2015	1st	2nd	K9
Smash 4 Oomba 5/1	May 1, 2015	1st	1st	Mr. ConCon
Fire & Dice Sundays #16	May 3, 2015	1st	1st	Xzax
Oblivion Tournaments Biweekly 5/5	May 5, 2015	1st	1st	K9
Fire & Dice Thur #10	May 7, 2015	1st	—	—
Fire & Dice Thur #11	May 14, 2015	1st	—	—
Smash 4 Oomba 5/15	May 15, 2015	1st	—	—
BESST 2015	May 17, 2015	1st	1st	K9
Double Vegas Down Attack 9	May 18, 2015	1st	—	—
Combo Breaker 2015	May 22–24, 2015	1st	—	—
Double Vegas Down Attack 10	May 30–31, 2015	1st	1st	FOW
LA PARADISO	June 13–14, 2015	1st	1st	Stingers
CEO 2015	June 26–28, 2015	1st	3rd	Hungrybox
FC Smash 15XR: Return	July 4–5, 2015	1st	2nd	Hungrybox
EVO 2015	July 17–19, 2015	1st	Top 16	Anti
MSS 1	July 25, 2015	1st	—	—
Top Cut Comics 7/28	July 28, 2015	1st	—	—
Poplar 7/30	July 30, 2015	1st	—	—
Low Tier City 3	August 1–2, 2015	1st	2nd	Mew2King
Super Smash Con	August 6–9, 2015	1st	1st	Nairo
PAX Prime 2015	August 28–30, 2015	1st	1st	MVD
Top Cut Comics 9/12	September 12, 2015	1st	5th	HoRi
Sunday Smash 34	September 13, 2015	1st	—	—
Top Cut Comics 9/15	September 15, 2015	1st	—	—
Poplar 9/17	September 17, 2015	1st	1st	Shevy
Rebirth V	September 19, 2015	1st	1st	V115
Smash 4-Ever #26	September 30, 2015	1st	—	—
The Big House 5	October 2–4, 2015	1st	1st	Nairo
MLG World Finals 2015	October 16–18, 2015	2nd	1st	Nairo
E2C 19	October 24, 2015	1st	1st	Zinoto
Tipped Off 11	November 7–8, 2015	1st	1st	6WX
iBUYPOWER Cup	November 14, 2015	1st	—	—
GENESIS 3	January 15–17, 2016	1st	2nd	Nairo
Get On My Level 2016	May 20–22, 2016	2nd	—	—
2GGT: Mexico Saga	June 4, 2016	2nd	5th	VoiD
Smash'N'Splash 2	June 11–12, 2016	2nd	2nd	Abadango
Low Tier City 4	June 18–19, 2016	1st	1st	Nairo
CEO 2016	June 24–26, 2016	9th	3rd	Nairo
WTFox 2	July 1–3, 2016	3rd	1st	Mr. R
EVO 2016	July 15–16, 2016	3rd	—	—
Super Smash Con 2016	August 11–14, 2016	13th	2nd	Nairo
Endgame	August 20–21, 2016	1st	1st	Ally
Shine 2016	August 26–28, 2016	1st	2nd	ESAM
Collision XIV	September 3, 2016	4th	1st	Nairo
2GGT: Abadango Saga	September 24, 2016	1st	1st	Komorikiri
The Big House 6	October 7–9, 2016	1st	1st	Nairo
KTAR XIX	November 19, 2016	1st	1st	Nairo
UGC Smash Open	December 2–4, 2016	1st	1st	Nairo
Smash City LA	December 11, 2016	1st	—	—
2GGT: ZeRo Saga	December 16–18, 2016	4th	1st	Nairo
2GGC: GENESIS Saga	January 14, 2017	1st	3rd	Tweek
GENESIS 4	January 20–22, 2017	3rd	4th	Nairo
2GGC: Midwest Mayhem Saga	February 11, 2017	1st	7th	6WX
Frostbite 2017	February 25–26, 2017	1st	4th	Nairo
PAX Arena at PAX East 2017	March 12, 2017	1st	—	—
Frame Perfect Series 2	March 18–19, 2017	2nd	1st	Tsu
2GGC: Civil War	March 24–26, 2017	49th	2nd	Nairo
Ignition #76	March 29, 2017	1st	—	—
KTAR XX	April 1–2, 2017	1st	1st	MkLeo
Ignition #77	April 5, 2017	1st	—	—
Midwest Mayhem 8: North American Tour	April 8, 2017	1st	1st	Ally
Ignition #78	April 12, 2017	1st	—	—
CEO Dreamland	April 14–16, 2017	1st	1st	Nairo
Ignition #79	April 19, 2017	1st	—	—
Ignition #80	April 26, 2017	1st	—	—
DreamHack Austin 2017	April 28–30, 2017	1st	1st	MkLeo
Ignition #81	May 3, 2017	1st	—	—
Ignition #82	May 10, 2017	1st	—	—
Royal Flush	May 12–14, 2017	1st	1st	Nairo
2GGC: Greninja Saga	May 20, 2017	9th	17th	Nairo
MomoCon 2017	May 25–28, 2017	3rd	4th	Nairo
Smash 'N' Splash 3	June 2–4, 2017	1st	2nd	Tweek
Ignition #86	June 7, 2017	1st	1st	Tyroy
2GGC: Nairo Saga	June 10–11, 2017	1st	2nd	Nairo
Ignition #87	June 14, 2017	1st	1st	Tyroy
CEO 2017	June 16–18, 2017	1st	—	—
Ignition #88	June 28, 2017	1st	—	—
Midwest Mayhem 9: Old vs New	July 1, 2017	1st	—	—
Ignition #89	July 5, 2017	1st	—	—
2GGC: ARMS Saga	July 8–9, 2017	2nd	2nd	Tsu-
Mega Smash Mondays 104	July 10, 2017	9th	—	—
EVO 2017	July 14–16, 2017	2nd	—	—
Ignition #91	July 19, 2017	1st	—	—
DreamHack Atlanta 2017	July 21–23, 2017	9th	3rd	Nairo
Ignition #93	August 2, 2017	1st	—	—
Low Tier City 5	August 5–6, 2017	2nd	2nd	Mistake
Ignition #94	August 9, 2017	1st	—	—
Super Smash Con 2017	August 10–13, 2017	2nd	3rd	Nairo
Ignition #95	August 16, 2017	1st	—	—
2GGC: SCR Saga	August 19–20, 2017	1st	3rd	Nairo
Shine 2017	August 25–27, 2017	1st	3rd	Nairo
PAX Arena at PAX West 2017	September 1–4, 2017	1st	—	—
2GGC: West Side Saga	September 9, 2017	1st	1st	Nairo
GameTyrant Expo 2017	September 29 – October 1, 2017	3rd	2nd	Nairo
The Big House 7	October 6–8, 2017	4th	1st	Nairo
DreamHack Denver 2017	October 20–22, 2017	1st	—	—
Clutch City Clash 2	October 28–29, 2017	1st	2nd	Trela
2GGC: MkLeo Saga	November 4, 2017	13th	1st	Nairo
Ignition #109	November 22, 2017	1st	—	—
Midwest Mayhem 10	November 25, 2017	2nd	2nd	Cosmos
2GG Championship	December 1–3, 2017	2nd	—	—
Smash 4 Boot Camp	December 7–10, 2017	4th	2nd	Nairo

=== Super Smash Bros. for Nintendo 3DS ===
Tournament	Date	1v1 Placement
Xanadu Smash 4 Invitational	November 6, 2014	7th

=== Super Smash Bros. Ultimate ===
Tournament	Date	1v1 Placement	2v2 Placement	Partner
Super Smash Bros. Invitational	June 12, 2018	1st	—	—
Smash Conference United	January 5–6, 2019	9th	3rd	Mew2King
Smash Ultimate Summit	March 8–10, 2019	13th	—	—
