= 2018 in esports =

List of events in 2018 in esports (also known as professional gaming).

== Calendar of events ==
=== Tournaments ===
Date	Game	Event	Location	Winner(s)
January 12–28	Counter-Strike: Global Offensive	ELEAGUE Major 2018	Fox Theater − Atlanta & Agganis Arena − Boston, United States	Cloud9
January 19–21	Super Smash Bros. for Wii U Super Smash Bros. Melee; Super Smash Bros.	Genesis 5	Oakland Convention Center (January 19 and 20) & Paramount Theater (January 21) − Oakland, United States	MKLeo (SSB4); Plup (SSBM); Alvin (SSB)
January 26–28	various fighting games	Evo Japan 2018	Sunshine City (January 26 and 27) & Akiba Square (January 28) − Tokyo, Japan	see main page
February 13–18	Rainbow Six Siege	Six Invitational 2018	Ubisoft Montreal Studio − Montreal, Canada	Penta Sports
February 17–25	Counter-Strike: Global Offensive	StarSeries Season 4	Kyiv Cybersport Arena − Kyiv, Ukraine	Mousesports
February 27–March 4	Counter-Strike: Global Offensive	Intel Extreme Masters Season XII – World Championship	Spodek − Katowice, Poland	Fnatic
March 4–11	Dota 2	The Bucharest Major	Polyvalent Hall − Bucharest, Romania	Virtus.pro
March 13–18	Counter-Strike: Global Offensive; Dota 2 Hearthstone; StarCraft II	WESG 2017	HICEC − Haikou, China	Russian Forces (CS:GO Female); Fnatic (CS:GO Male); Team Russia (Dota 2); GLHuiHui (Hearthstone Female); Fujitora (Hearthstone Male); Maru (StarCraft II)
March 22–25	PlayerUnknown's Battlegrounds	PGL-PUBG Spring Invitational 2018	PGL Studios − Bucharest, Romania	Ghost Gaming
March 29–April 1	Counter-Strike: Global Offensive; FIFA 18; Hearthstone; League of Legends; PlayerUnknown's Battlegrounds; Rainbow Six Siege; StarCraft II: Wings of Liberty; Team Fortress 2	Copenhagen Games 2018	Bella Center − Copenhagen, Denmark	Team Singularity (CS:GO Female); The Imperial (CS:GO Male); Mikkel Hjorth Bach (FIFA 18); Alexnoerh (Hearthstone); Sørbye Esport (LoL); De Uheldige Helte (PUBG); Benjamaster (R6S); Lillekanin (SC2); Ascenchilada (TF2)
March 29–April 7	Dota 2	Dota Asia Championships 2018	Shanghai Oriental Sports Center − Shanghai, China	Mineski
April 27–May 6	Dota 2	EPICENTER XL	VTB Ice Palace − Moscow, Russia	PSG.LGD
May 1–6	Counter-Strike: Global Offensive	Intel Extreme Masters Season XIII – Sydney	Sydney Super Dome − Sydney, Australia	FaZe Clan
May 3–20	League of Legends	2018 Mid-Season Invitational	Zénith Paris − Paris, France	Royal Never Give Up
May 14–20	Dota 2	Mars Dota 2 League Changsha Major	Hunan International Convention and Exhibition Center − Changsha, China	PSG.LGD
May 14–20	Counter-Strike: Global Offensive	ESL Pro League Season 7 Finals	Verizon Theatre − Grand Prairie, United States	Astralis
May 19–20	FIFA 18	2018 FIFA eClub World Cup	EA Paris Studio − Seine-Saint-Denis, France	Brøndby eSport
May 19–20	Rainbow Six Siege	Rainbow Six Pro League Season 7 Finals	Harrah's Resort − Atlantic City, United States	Team Liquid
May 19–21	Counter-Strike: Global Offensive; Quake Champions	DreamHack Open Tours 2018	Parc des Expositions − Tours, France	Team Liquid (Quake); North (CS:GO)
May 23–27	Dota 2	ESL One Birmingham 2018	Arena Birmingham − Birmingham, United Kingdom	Virtus.pro
May 28–June 3	Counter-Strike: Global Offensive	StarSeries Season 5	National Palace of Arts − Kyiv, Ukraine	Natus Vincere
June 1–3	Counter-Strike: Global Offensive; Hearthstone; PlayerUnknown's Battlegrounds; Rainbow Six Siege; Rainbow Six Siege	DreamHack Austin 2018	Austin Convention Center − Austin, United States	Space Soldiers (CS:GO); Amnesiac (Hearthstone); FaZe Clan (PUBG); Millenium (R6S); Serreal (StarCraft II)
June 1–July 13	Street Fighter V	ELEAGUE Street Fighter V Invitational 2018	Turner Studios − Atlanta, United States	Tokido
June 2–10	Dota 2	China Dota 2 Supermajor	Yuanshen Stadium − Shanghai, China	Team Liquid
June 8–10	Counter-Strike: Global Offensive	Esports Championship Series Season 5 Finals	SSE Arena − London, United Kingdom	Astralis
June 8–10	Rocket League	Rocket League Championship Series Season 5 Finals	Copper Box Arena − London, United Kingdom	Team Dignitas
June 8–10	Dragon Ball FighterZ	Summit of Power	Summit House − Los Angeles, United States	HookGangGod
June 12	Fortnite	Fortnite Celebrity Pro-AM	Los Angeles Convention Center − Los Angeles, United States	Ninja & Marshmello
June 13–17	Counter-Strike: Global Offensive	ESL One Belo Horizonte 2018	Mineirinho Arena − Belo Horizonte, Brazil	FaZe Clan
June 14–18	Counter-Strike: Global Offensive	CS:GO Asia Championships 2018	Yuanshen Stadium − Shanghai, China	Natus Vincere
July 3–8	Counter-Strike: Global Offensive	ESL One Cologne 2018	Lanxess Arena − Cologne, Germany	Natus Vincere
July 21–29	Counter-Strike: Global Offensive	ELEAGUE CS:GO Premier 2018	ELEAGUE Arena – Atlanta, United States	Astralis
July 25–29	PlayerUnknown's Battlegrounds	PUBG Global Invitational 2018	Mercedes-Benz Arena – Berlin, Germany	Gen.G Gold (TPP); Oh My God (FPP)
July 25–29	Dota 2	Dota Summit 9	Summit House − Los Angeles, United States	Evil Geniuses
July 27–28	Overwatch	2018 Overwatch League Grand Finals	Barclays Center − New York City, United States	London Spitfire
July 27–29	Mobile Legends: Bang Bang	Mobile Legends South East Asia Cup (MSC) 2018	Jakarta International Expo - Jakarta, Indonesia	Bren Esports
August 1–6	Counter-Strike: Global Offensive	Intel Extreme Masters Season XIII – Shanghai	Shanghai New International Expo Center – Shanghai, China	NRG Esports
August 2–4	FIFA 18	2018 FIFA eWorld Cup	The O2 Arena – London, United Kingdom	Msdossary
August 3–5	various fighting games	Evolution 2018	Mandalay Bay – Las Vegas, United States	Heiho (BB:CTB); SonicFox (DBFZ); Omito (GGXR2); Rewind (Injustice 2); Problem X (SFV); Lima (SSB4); Leffen (SSBM); LowHigh (Tekken 7)
August 9–12	Super Smash Bros. Brawl; Super Smash Bros. for Wii U Super Smash Bros. Melee; Super Smash Bros.	Super Smash Con 2018	Dulles Expo Center – Chantilly, United States	Nairo (SSBB); MKLeo (SSB4); Armada (SSBM); SuPeRbOoMfAn (SSB)
August 13–19	Rainbow Six Siege	Six Major Paris 2018	Paris expo Porte de Versailles – Paris, France	G2 Esports
August 15–19	Call of Duty: WWII	Call of Duty World League Championship 2018	Nationwide Arena – Columbus, United States	Evil Geniuses
August 20–25	Dota 2	The International 2018	Rogers Arena − Vancouver, Canada	OG
August 26–September 1	Arena of Valor; Clash Royale; Hearthstone; League of Legends; Pro Evolution Soccer; Rainbow Six Siege	Asian Games 2018	BritAma Arena - Jakarta, Indonesia	See main page
August 29–September 2	Counter-Strike: Global Offensive	DreamHack Masters Stockholm 2018	Ericsson Globe − Stockholm, Sweden	North
August 31–September 3	Fortnite	Fortnite Summer Skirmish Grand Finals	Washington State Convention Center − Seattle, United States	Morgaussetv
September 5–23	Counter-Strike: Global Offensive	FACEIT Major: London 2018	SSE Arena, Wembley – London, United Kingdom	Astralis
September 26–30	Counter-Strike: Global Offensive	ESL One New York 2018	Barclays Center – New York City, United States	Mousesports
October 7–14	Counter-Strike: Global Offensive	StarSeries Season 6	Kyiv Cybersport Arena − Kyiv, Ukraine	Ence
October 23–28	Counter-Strike: Global Offensive	EPICENTER 2018	VTB Ice Palace − Moscow, Russia	FaZe Clan
October 23–28	Dota 2	ESL One Hamburg 2018	Barclaycard Arena − Hamburg, Germany	Team Secret
October 26–28	Fortnite	Fortnite Fall Skirmish Grand Finals	San Jose Convention Center − San Jose, United States	FaZe Clan
October 29	Virtual Regatta	ESailing World Championship	Sarasota, Florida	"L1"
October 29–November 4	Dota 2	DreamLeague Season 10	DreamHack Studios − Stockholm, Sweden	Tigers
November 1–4	Counter-Strike: Global Offensive	CS Summit 3	Summit House − Los Angeles, United States	NRG Esports
November 2–3	Overwatch	Overwatch World Cup 2018 Finals	Anaheim Convention Center − Anaheim, United States	South Korea
November 2–3	Hearthstone	2018 Hearthstone Global Games Finals	Anaheim Convention Center − Anaheim, United States	China
November 2–3	Rainbow Six Siege	2018 World Championship Series Global Finals	Anaheim Convention Center − Anaheim, United States	Serral
November 3	League of Legends	2018 League of Legends World Championship Finals	Incheon Munhak Stadium − Incheon, South Korea	Invictus Gaming
November 6–11	Counter-Strike: Global Offensive	Intel Extreme Masters Season XIII – Chicago	Wintrust Arena − Chicago, United States	Astralis
November 9–11	Rocket League	Rocket League Championship Series Season 6 Finals	Orleans Arena − Las Vegas, United States	Cloud9
November 9–18	Dota 2	Kuala Lumpur Major	Axiata Arena − Kuala Lumpur, Malaysia	Virtus.pro
December 1–2	Tekken 7	Tekken World Tour Finals 2018	Theater Amsterdam – Amsterdam, Netherlands	Rangchu
December 14–16	Street Fighter V	Capcom Cup 2018	ESports Arena Las Vegas – Las Vegas, United States	Gachikun
