= Super Smash Bros. =

Series of crossover fighting games

- Logo used since 2018
- Genre: Platform fighting
- Developers: HAL Laboratory (1999–2008); Sora Ltd. (2008–present); Bandai Namco Studios (2014–present)
- Publisher: Nintendo
- Creator: Masahiro Sakurai
- Platforms: Nintendo 64; GameCube; Wii; Nintendo 3DS; Wii U; Nintendo Switch
- First release: Super Smash Bros. January 21, 1999
- Latest release: Super Smash Bros. Ultimate; December 7, 2018

Super Smash Bros. (Note: Japanese: 大乱闘スマッシュブラザーズ, Hepburn: Dai Rantō Sumasshu Burazāzu) (Note: Commonly shortened to Smash Bros. or Smash. For the former, Nintendo uses "Smash Brothers" as its official pronunciation, although it is also informally pronounced "Smash Bros" (-BROHZ).) is a series of platform fighting video games published by Nintendo. Created by Masahiro Sakurai, the Super Smash Bros. series is a crossover featuring many characters from other video game series created by Nintendo and other developers. Its gameplay is distinct from traditional fighting games, with players aiming to knock each other off stages after accumulating damage with numerous attacks. The games have also featured a variety of side modes, including single-player story modes.

Sakurai conceived the idea of Super Smash Bros. while working at HAL Laboratory in 1998 with the help of Satoru Iwata. The series's first game, Super Smash Bros. (1999), was released for the Nintendo 64 and used characters from Nintendo franchises including Mario, Donkey Kong, The Legend of Zelda, Kirby, and Pokémon. The game was a success, and Sakurai was asked to make a sequel for the then-upcoming GameCube, Super Smash Bros. Melee, which was developed in 13 months and released in 2001.

After Sakurai left HAL Laboratory, Iwata, who had become Nintendo's president, convinced him to continue directing the series. Sakurai directed Super Smash Bros. Brawl (2008) for the Wii and Super Smash Bros. for Nintendo 3DS and Wii U (2014) for the Nintendo 3DS and Wii U. The series's most recent game, Super Smash Bros. Ultimate, was released in 2018 for the Nintendo Switch, with Sakurai again returning as director and Bandai Namco Studios aiding Sora Ltd., Sakurai's own company, in the game's development.

The Super Smash Bros. games have received critical acclaim and commercial success, with the series selling over 77 million units combined as of 2025 and multiple of its games being considered among the best of all time. The series has also attracted a dedicated community of competitive players who compete in esports tournaments, and Super Smash Bros. has inspired numerous other platform fighting games and has been credited for bringing popularity to several of the franchises whose characters it features.

== History and development ==
=== 1996–1999: Conception and first game ===
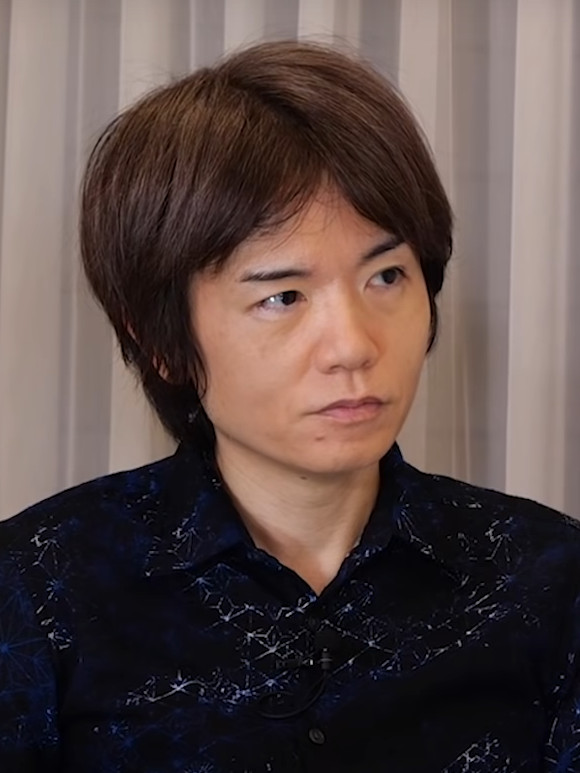
Masahiro Sakurai, the creator of the Super Smash Bros. series, in 2021

After developing Kirby Super Star (1996), Masahiro Sakurai, a game developer at HAL Laboratory, wished to experiment with 3D graphics and animation following the release of the Nintendo 64 video game console. Sakurai proposed two games to Nintendo for release on the system: a four-player free-for-all fighting game and a RC robot stealth exploration game where the player progressed through levels by hacking into security cameras. While both proposals were praised by Nintendo, HAL Laboratory was currently developing several other games for the Nintendo 64, including Mother 3, and was unable to begin full development on either prototype. After HAL's other projects were cancelled, however, the company needed to produce a finished game as soon as possible. The fighting game prototype was chosen as the studio's next project after Sakurai determined it would take less time to complete than the RC game.

The fighting game prototype, titled Dragon King: The Fighting Game, was developed by three people: Sakurai was responsible for the game's planning, design, graphics, modeling, and animation, while his coworker Satoru Iwata handled the programming and a third developer was responsible for the game's audio. Because he was leading another project at the time, Iwata created Dragon King's programming on weekends. Iwata had agreed to the project because he wished to create a four-player game utilizing the three-dimensional joystick on the Nintendo 64 controller, while Sakurai wished to create an alternative to the fighting games dominating the video game industry at the time.

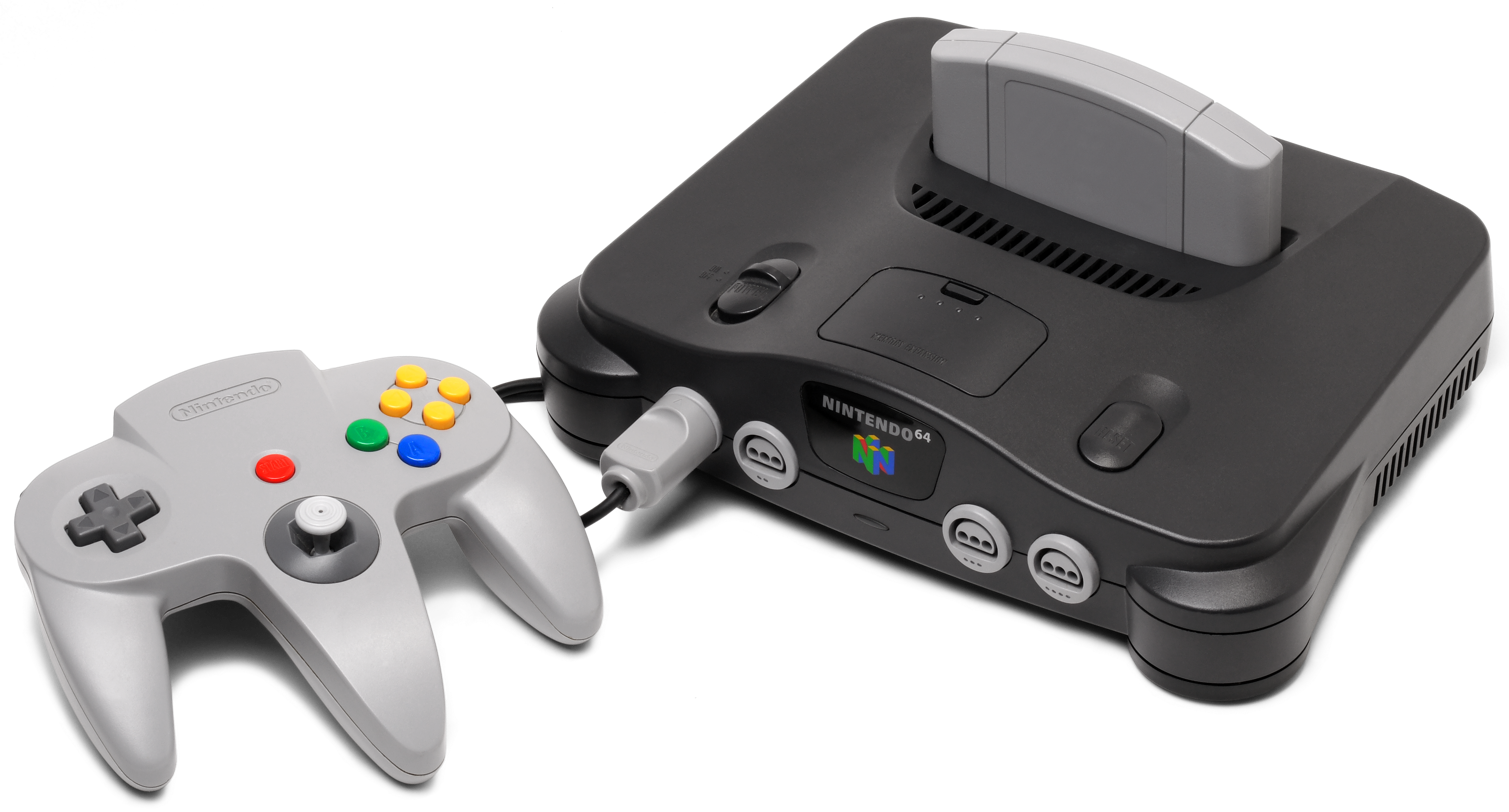
Super Smash Bros. (1999) was made for the Nintendo 64, whose capacity for 3D graphics, joystick on the controller, and integrated 4-player multiplayer functionality heavily influenced the game's design.

Sakurai had developed the idea for a new type of fighting game in 1996, because he felt that existing fighting games had become too complex, with gameplay over-reliant on combos that reduced the importance of player strategy. He sought to create a game that allowed for more player improvisation and interplay, creating a system of accumulated damage to force players to react differently to each attack instead of making the depletion of the other player's life bar the only goal. He created "smash attacks" that could be triggered with a more aggressive "flick" of the joystick while searching for ways to best integrate the Nintendo 64 controller's joystick into the prototype's gameplay.

While Dragon King had largely the same gameplay as what would become Super Smash Bros., it lacked any crossover elements. Sakurai had reservations about including a cast of original characters, saying that existing fighting games had too many "main characters" competing to be the focus of marketing, making it more difficult for players to care compared to games that have fewer protagonists and several side characters. While Sakurai said that would be acceptable in fighting games released for arcades, the transition to home consoles meant that it was important to establish the game world's "atmosphere" as soon as possible, and he did not want new players to encounter a large roster of unfamiliar characters. Therefore, he asked Nintendo's permission to use various characters from its other games. The proposal to use pre-existing characters was controversial, and Nintendo's Shigeru Miyamoto rejected the idea. In response, Sakurai and Iwata created a demo of the game featuring Mario, Fox McCloud, Samus Aran, and Donkey Kong, and ensured that it was well-balanced before presenting it again. Upon seeing the revised demo, Miyamoto gave permission for the game to use Nintendo characters.

After the game's completion, it was met with mixed reception internally; many other developers reacted positively, while Nintendo's sales team did not want the company's characters to fight each other. The game was ultimately titled "Super Smash Bros." after Iwata suggested the inclusion of the word "brothers" to indicate that the characters "weren't simply fighting" but "were friends who were settling a little disagreement." Super Smash Bros. was released for the Nintendo 64 in Japan on January 21, 1999, and in North America on April 26, 1999. To help appeal to players used to the gameplay of traditional fighting games, Sakurai created the "Smash Bros. Dojo!!", a website intended to teach players strategies and techniques for the game.

=== 1999–2001: Super Smash Bros. Melee ===
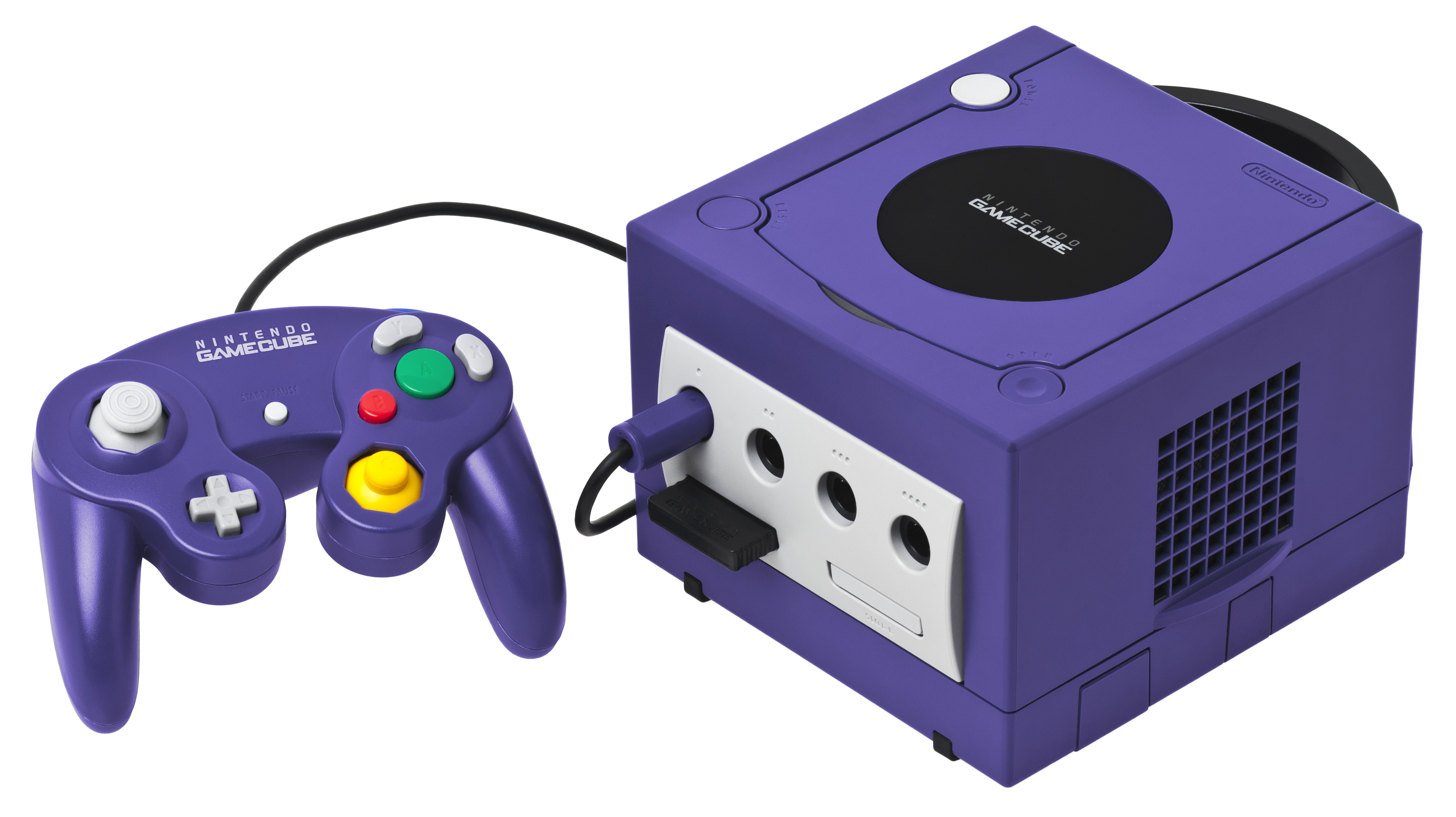
Super Smash Bros. Melee (2001) became the best-selling game released for the Nintendo GameCube.

In May 1999, at the Electronic Entertainment Expo (E3), Sakurai privately revealed that he was developing a sequel to Super Smash Bros. for the then-upcoming Nintendo GameCube, and the design plan for the game was completed on July 5, 1999. HAL Laboratory returned to develop the game, and was assisted by other studios, including Creatures Inc. By May 2001, over 50 people were actively working on the game, while over 100 had been involved with the project at some point in time. The game was officially revealed as Super Smash Bros. Melee at E3 2001, seven months ahead of its release in North America. Because the GameCube was both more powerful and easier to develop games for than the Nintendo 64, Melee was able to include much more content than its predecessor, including 14 new characters and many multiplayer options and modes.

The development of Melee lasted only 13 months, during which Sakurai described his lifestyle as "destructive". He said the game was the "biggest project [he] had ever led up to that point", and during development he took no holidays and only short breaks on weekends. Development was held back by technical limitations, with the GameCube not being powerful enough to allow features such as eight-player multiplayer. Collectible "trophies" were introduced, allowing players to collect 3D models of various Nintendo characters as a way to include more characters than could be developed as fighters. Sakurai designed Melee to appeal to people who were "well-versed in video games", compared to the more casual audience targeted by the first Super Smash Bros. game, and Melee's physics system underwent extensive revisions. Melee also included full-motion video scenes; HAL worked with three separate computer graphics studios in Tokyo to complete the animations by E3 2001 and Sakurai created the storyboards himself. Super Smash Bros. Melee was released for the GameCube on November 21, 2001, in Japan, and on December 3, 2001, in North America. Melee later went on to be the best-selling game released for the GameCube.

=== 2005–2008: Super Smash Bros. Brawl ===
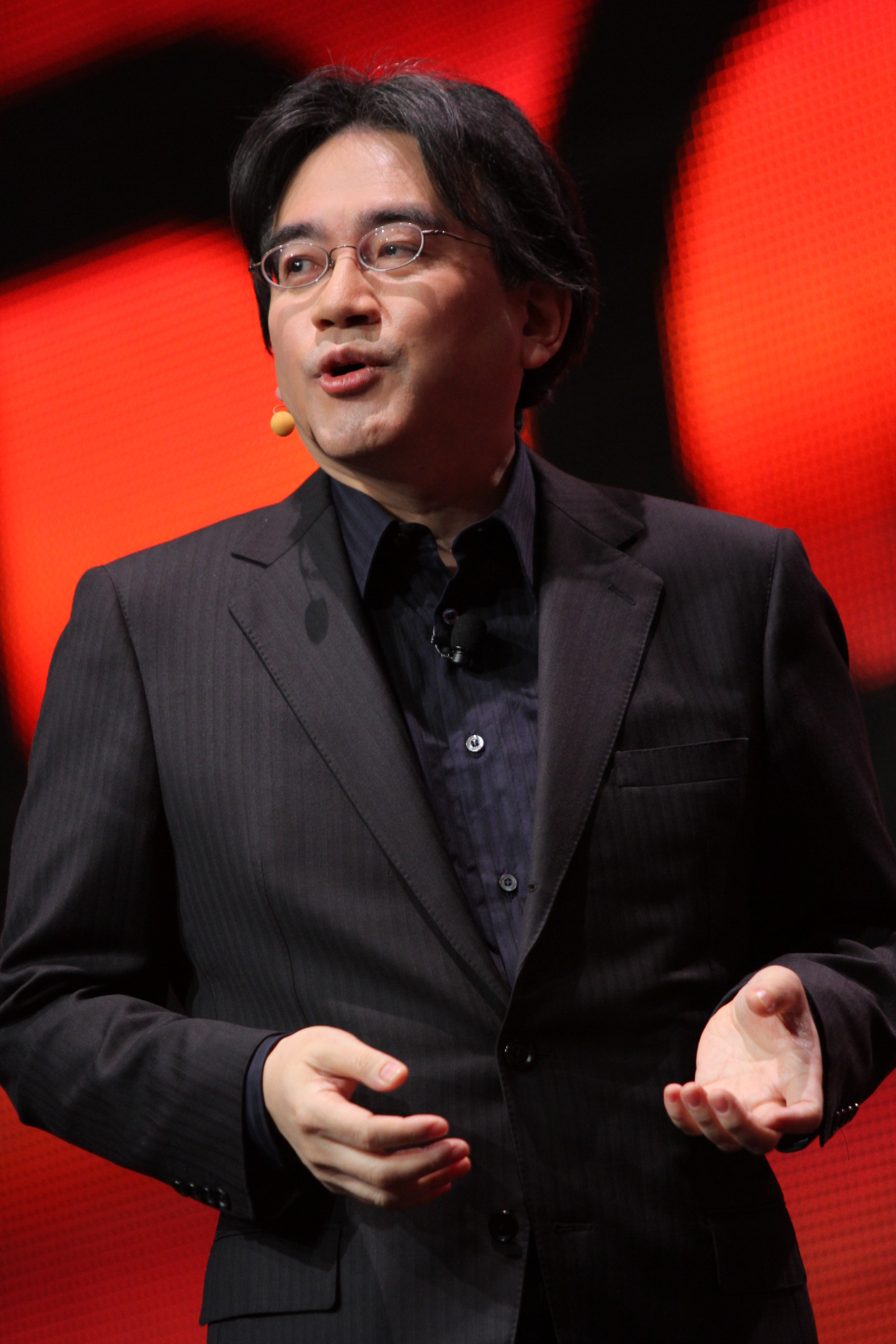
Satoru Iwata, Nintendo's president, asked Sakurai to create Super Smash Bros. Brawl (2008) for the Wii.

In May 2005, at a press conference prior to E3 2005, Iwata—who had become the president of Nintendo—said that a new Super Smash Bros. game was in development for the Wii and would launch alongside the system the next year, featuring online multiplayer using the system's Wi-Fi capabilities. The announcement came as a surprise to Sakurai, who had left HAL Laboratory in 2003 and had not heard about an upcoming Smash Bros. game. Iwata had made the announcement after many people polled by Nintendo showed a desire for a new Smash Bros. game with online play, despite planning on the next game in the series having not yet begun. After the announcement, Iwata met with Sakurai and asked him to create a new Smash Bros. game for the Wii, saying that Nintendo would simply port Melee to the system with online functionality if he refused. Sakurai accepted, and completed the planning document for the next Super Smash Bros. game in July 2005.

The former Super Smash Bros. team at HAL Laboratory was busy with another project, so Sakurai assembled a team including staff from Game Arts, another studio. Sora Ltd., Sakurai's own company, was also involved. The game's development team included over 100 full-time staff, with over 700 people involved altogether. One year after its announcement, the trailer revealing the game as Super Smash Bros. Brawl aired at E3 2006.

Brawl was designed with a focus on creating online multiplayer as well as a lengthy single-player story mode intended to flesh out the game's characters and give them more time in the spotlight. Sakurai had wanted the single-player mode to be developed by a separate team, though all except for its animated cutscenes were created by Brawl's main team. Sakurai worked with Kazushige Nojima, who had written scenarios for various Final Fantasy games, to create the storyline for Brawl's single-player mode. Because the Wii was targeted towards more casual players than the GameCube and the game would need to be played with the Wii Remote controller, Sakurai decided to adjust the gameplay speed of Brawl to make it considerably slower than Melee. Brawl was also the first game in the series to undergo playtesting, with a small team of four being tasked with evaluating the game's balance. It introduced several new mechanics to the Smash Bros. series, including powerful "Final Smash" attacks able to be activated after destroying an orb and "Assist Trophy" items that allow players to summon certain characters to fight alongside them, which were created as another way to increase the number of characters present in Brawl.

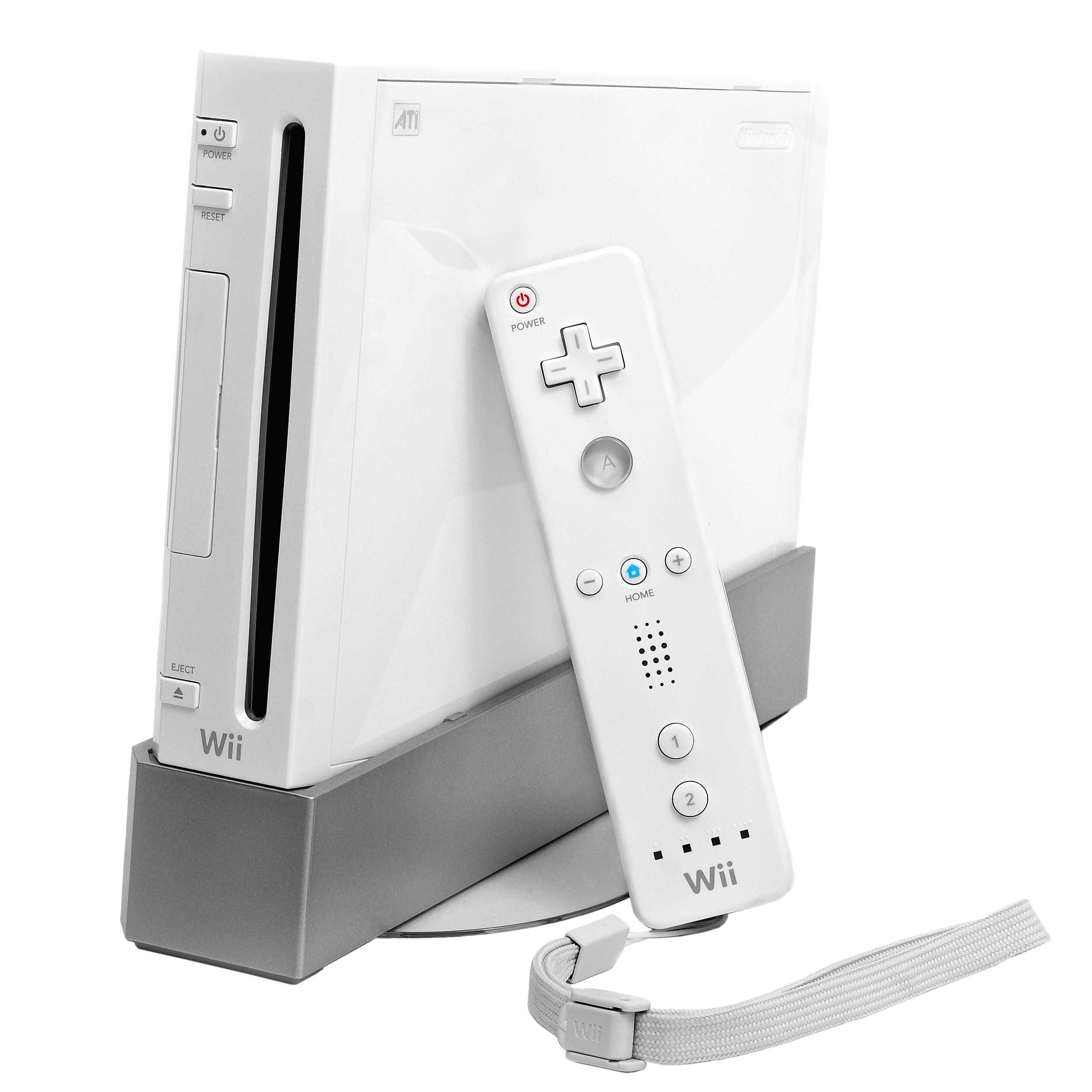
The casual audience of the Wii led Sakurai to slow down the gameplay of Brawl.

Brawl was the first game in the Super Smash Bros. to feature characters from third-party developers, with Solid Snake from Konami's Metal Gear and Sonic from Sega's Sonic the Hedgehog being playable fighters. Snake was revealed in the E3 2006 trailer, while Sonic was announced in October 2007 on the Smash Bros. Dojo!! website. Sakurai designed both Snake and Sonic to have a "distinct feel" from the other characters, though said he did not consciously try to treat Nintendo characters differently from non-Nintendo characters in terms of design. Both Metal Gear creator Hideo Kojima and Sonic the Hedgehog co-creator Yuji Naka had asked Sakurai to include their respective characters in Melee, though time constraints meant that neither character would be added to that game. Brawl's final roster included 35 playable characters, with nearly all characters from Melee returning in addition to 15 new characters.

Super Smash Bros. Brawl was released for the Wii on January 31, 2008, in Japan, and March 9, 2008, in North America. The game's release followed a delay; Nintendo had said the game would release in December 2007, but pushed its release date back to early 2008 two months ahead of its scheduled launch.

=== 2011–2016: Nintendo 3DS and Wii U games ===
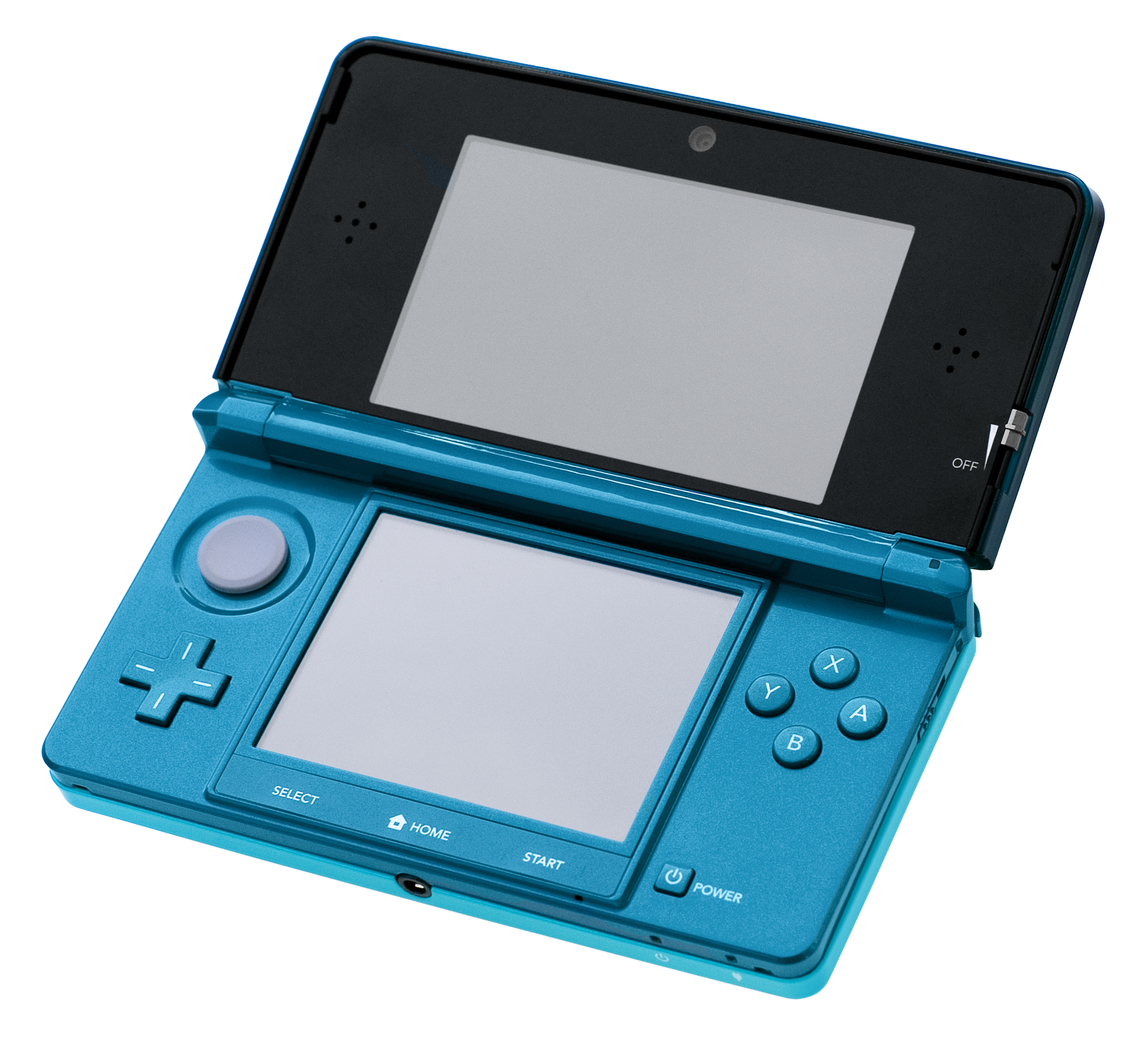
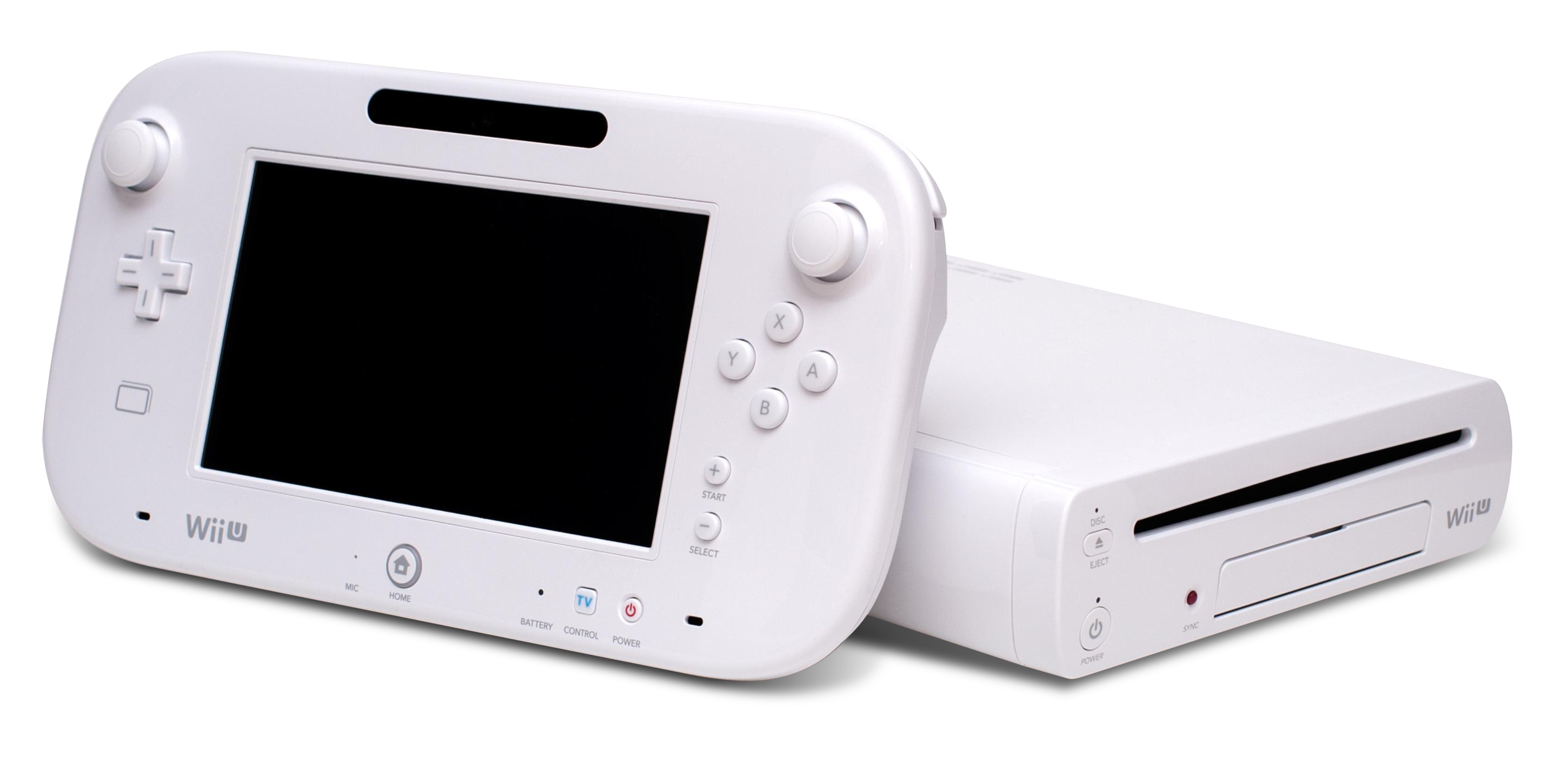
The fourth Super Smash Bros. game (2014) comprised two releases for both the Nintendo 3DS (left) and Wii U (right), marking the series' debut on a handheld console and a high-definition console, respectively.

At E3 2011 in June 2011, Iwata announced that Sakurai would be developing a new Super Smash Bros. game that would release on both the handheld Nintendo 3DS and the Wii U, a home console, with the two versions having connectivity with each other. However, Sakurai was developing Kid Icarus Uprising for the Nintendo 3DS at the time, and work on the next Smash Bros. game did not begin until after Uprising's release in 2012. The game was developed by Sora Ltd. alongside Bandai Namco Studios, with various staff members from Bandai Namco's other fighting games, Tekken and Soulcalibur, joining the team. The games were formally revealed during a Nintendo Direct video presentation at E3 2013, titled Super Smash Bros. for Nintendo 3DS and Super Smash Bros. for Wii U (Smash 4).

Sakurai felt that the cutscenes developed for Brawl's story mode were unable to impact players as he wished because they were shared widely on the internet, so he said that Smash 4 would include neither a story mode nor cutscenes, and that the animation resources would instead go into creating computer-generated videos to reveal new characters coming to the game online. The "fighter reveal videos" continued to be used for future games. Sakurai aimed for Smash 4's gameplay speed to be in between that of Melee and Brawl, and designed the Nintendo 3DS and Wii U versions to have the same characters, movesets, and items, but both versions would have exclusive stages not in the other. Because of the 3DS's technical limitations, however, parity between both versions' characters required those not technically possible on the 3DS—including characters that transform mid-match such as the Pokémon Trainer or Princess Zelda and Sheik, or the Ice Climbers, which act as two characters at once—could not be in either game. The Nintendo 3DS and Wii U games lack cross-platform play, but players can transfer data between the two games, including customized characters.

Super Smash Bros. for Nintendo 3DS released in Japan on September 13, 2014, and in North America on October 3, 2014. Super Smash Bros. for Wii U released later that year: it first launched in North America on November 21, 2014, and released in Japan on December 6, 2014. Smash 4 became the first game in the Super Smash Bros. series to receive paid downloadable content (DLC); Nintendo released additional characters, stages, and Mii fighter outfits able to be purchased individually for both versions of the game. The final DLC characters for Smash 4, Corrin from Fire Emblem Fates and Bayonetta from Bayonetta, were released on February 3, 2016. Including DLC, Smash 4's full roster featured 56 characters, 19 of which were new.

=== 2015–2024: Super Smash Bros. Ultimate ===
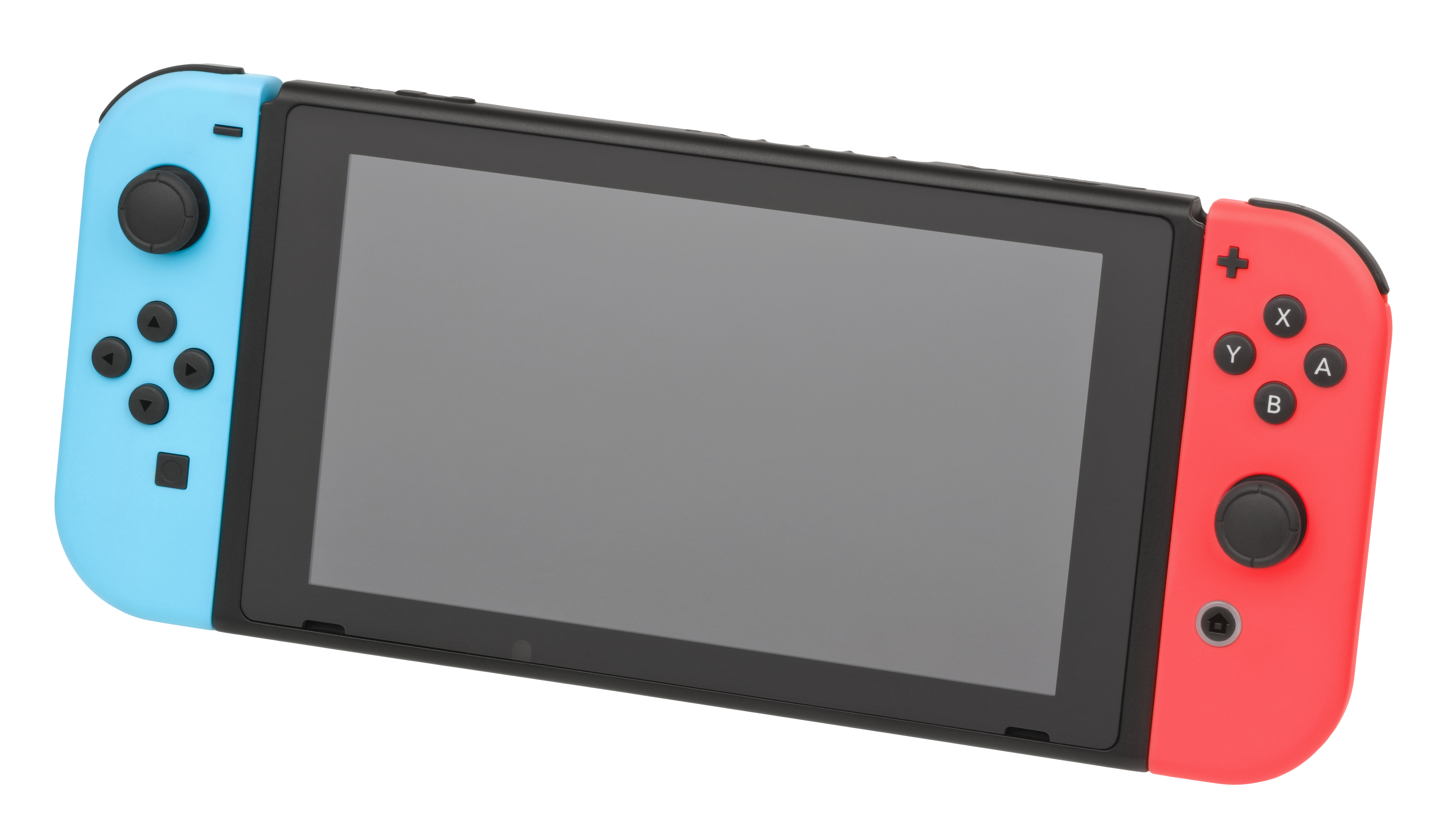
Super Smash Bros. Ultimate (2018) was made for the Nintendo Switch, a hybrid system able to act as both a handheld and home console. Ultimate is currently the best-selling fighting game in history and the third best-selling Switch game.

Iwata asked Sakurai to direct a new Super Smash Bros. game for the Nintendo Switch before the system was publicly announced. Sakurai said it was the last request he received from Iwata before his death in July 2015. Sakurai began planning the Smash Bros. game for the Switch while DLC for Smash 4 was still in progress, and finished the game's proposal document on December 16, 2015. Active development on the next game in the series began in February 2016, after all DLC content had been released for the Nintendo 3DS and Wii U games. Bandai Namco Studios returned to assist Sora Ltd. in developing the next Smash game, and the similarity between Wii U and Nintendo Switch's hardware made development easier than past games, which were developed by teams assembled from scratch.

Because the transition to the newest entry in the series seemed easier than normal, Sakurai proposed that the Smash game for the Nintendo Switch feature all previous playable characters from throughout the series. Managing to include all past characters became a major goal of the game's development. Sakurai scrapped plans to differ gameplay between the Switch's TV and handheld modes, because he found that the system's screen in handheld was good enough to make it not worthwhile to change the game for it. He decided to raise the gameplay speed again past Smash 4, though still decided that he did not want Ultimate to be as fast as Melee. Time constraints meant that the team could create neither a story mode similar to Brawl's nor a large assortment of collectible trophies, which had grown expensive to develop. Sakurai conceived "Spirits" as trophies' replacement and designed the game's story mode to be involved, but not more so than Brawl's, and he created the story mode's storyboards himself.

A Super Smash Bros. game for the Nintendo Switch was teased in a March 2018 Nintendo Direct, and the game was fully revealed as Super Smash Bros. Ultimate at E3 2018 three months later. Super Smash Bros. Ultimate released worldwide on the Nintendo Switch on December 7, 2018. After launch, Ultimate received continuous updates that added DLC characters, with a "Fighters Pass" containing five additional characters having been announced prior to the game's release. In January 2020, alongside the reveal of Byleth from Fire Emblem: Three Houses as the final DLC character in the Fighters Pass, Nintendo announced a second Fighters Pass, containing six additional characters. The final character added to Ultimate was Sora of Kingdom Hearts in October 2021; Ultimate continued receiving balance patches until December 2021 and minor updates until 2024.

== Gameplay ==
Super Smash Bros. has platform fighting gameplay, shown in a match of Ultimate (2018) with Ganondorf, Link, Mario, and Mega Man.

As a platform fighter, Super Smash Bros.'s gameplay differs from traditional fighting games. Instead of aiming to deplete their opponents' life bar, players' goal in Smash Bros. is to knock their opponents off the stage or out of bounds. Characters have a damage total—indicated by a rising percentage value—that increases as they take damage. As their total rises, they suffer more knockback from attacks, making it easier for them to be knocked away. Players lose a life when they are launched outside of the stage's boundaries, but when knocked offstage they can attempt to "recover" by using midair jumps and abilities to return to the stage. Players can "edge-guard" their opponents, attempting to prevent them from recovering.

Controls are simpler than other fighting games, with one button used for standard attacks and a second used for special attacks. Each character has a unique moveset; players can use different moves by attacking while inputting a certain direction on the analog stick or while their character is in a certain state, such as midair. Powerful "smash attacks" can be used by quickly moving the analog stick and pressing the attack button, and can become even stronger if charged by holding down the button. Each character has three smash attacks—side, up and down —, four standard and special attacks, with three corresponding to directions and the other initiated by pressing the button without any directional input, and five aerial attacks, following the same system but with forward and back being different directions instead of just "side".

When characters are hit by attacks, they undergo brief hitstun that leaves them vulnerable to further attacks and combos. Players can block attacks with a shield, and can dodge in different directions to become briefly invulnerable. Dodges can also be performed in midair, and some games allow directional air dodges that can be used while landing to initiate a "wavedash". Dodges leave characters exposed after they end, while shields weaken over time and break if they absorb too much damage, leaving their user vulnerable for a time. By shielding with correct timing, players can parry attacks. Characters using shields remain vulnerable to grabs, allowing opponents can grab and throw them in any one of four directions, creating a rock–paper–scissors dynamic between attacking, shielding, and grabbing. Starting with Brawl, characters can also use "Final Smashes", extremely powerful ultimate attacks unlocked after a character breaks a floating "Smash Ball" that has appeared or fills a charge meter over time.

A common element of Smash is items, which randomly spawn onstage if enabled. Items have various effects often based on other games; for example, the Super Mario series's Super Mushroom allows characters to grow in size, while the Super Scope—based on an accessory for the Super Nintendo Entertainment System—can be used as a weapon to launch projectiles. Other items, meanwhile, allow characters to recover damage they have taken. Items also exist that allow players to summon allies to fight alongside them and affect the environment: Poké Balls can be thrown to summon various Pokémon species, while Brawl introduced "Assist Trophies" that summon characters from other franchises.

Smash's logo is a circle crossed by two lines to symbolize the series's crossover aspect, with the circle's four sections representing its four-player gameplay.

Matches consist of multiple players: initially up to four could play at once; in Smash for Wii U and Ultimate, the limit is eight. Artificial intelligence-controlled computer players can substitute for human players. Matches can be either free-for-alls or between teams, and players can choose the rules by which the winner is determined. The most common modes are "Time" and "Stock"; in "Time", matches have a fixed time limit and players compete to have the most points by the end, gaining by knocking out others and losing them when knocked out themselves. "Stock" matches, by contrast, give players a finite number of lives, with the winner being the last player remaining. A less common mode is "Stamina", where players have a finite number of health and are eliminated when it reaches zero.

Players also have a variety of stages to choose from. The majority are based on other video games, but some, such as "Final Destination" and "Battlefield", are original to the Smash series. Stages have varying layouts of platforms and other obstacles, with some being flat planes without edges. Some stages have hazards such as boss fights with the Yellow Devil from the Mega Man series or Ridley from Metroid.

=== Side modes ===
In addition to multiplayer battles, the Smash series features various single-player side modes and minigames, many of which contain options for two-player co-operative gameplay. In "Home-Run Contest", for instance, players use the Home-Run Bat item to damage a sandbag and attempt to launch it as far as possible. In "Break the Targets", players use their character's abilities to navigate a course and destroy targets within it; courses are character-specific in Melee but available to all characters in Brawl. Smash 4 contains "Target Blast", where players launch a single bomb into an area to destroy as many targets within the area as possible. The first Smash game featured "Board the Platforms", where players were tasked with landing on several floating platforms as fast as possible on a character-specific platforming course.

The games have also included "Multi-Man Smash", which consists of several sub-modes where players battle multiple opponents at once, such as "100-Man Smash", where they must defeat 100 opponents; and "Cruel Smash", where they try to defeat as many extremely strong enemies as possible. Since Brawl, players can create custom stages to use in multiplayer matches and share online with other players. In Smash 4, the Wii U version featured the board game mode "Smash Tour", while the 3DS version featured "Smash Run", where players explore a large map to collect power-ups before a final battle. Ultimate introduced "Squad Strike", allowing matches where players change characters after each life.

Melee introduced "trophies", collectible 3D models of various characters and elements from Smash and other game series obtained within various modes and special minigames. Ultimate replaced trophies with "Spirits" that use 2D images instead of 3D models and require the player to complete a battle that combines elements to reference the Spirit's character. Collected Spirits can be attached to a character to buff their attributes or give them special abilities such as an additional midair jump.

Games across the series have included "Classic Mode", which consists of a series of battles against opponents either based on the player's character, pre-determined, or randomly generated, depending on the game. Classic Mode also contains within it minigames such as Break the Targets, a platforming challenge, or a bonus stage, and ends with a boss fight against Master Hand or another enemy. Smash games have also featured "All-Star Mode", where players must defeat every character in that game, and "Event Matches", where they face a series of themed battles. Several Smash games included single-player campaigns. Melee's campaign was called "Adventure Mode" and included a mix of platforming levels and typical battles based on various game series. Brawl's was far more expansive; titled "Subspace Emissary", it was a story-based mode with several platforming levels, boss fights, and typical battles mixed with cutscenes including all of the game's characters. The series's next campaign was in Ultimate, which featured "World of Light". World of Light lacked platforming, and consisted only of battles against Spirits, playable characters, and bosses scattered across an overworld, and used role-playing game elements such as a skill tree for character upgrades.

The series has included online multiplayer since Brawl; in Smash 4, it was split into two modes, "For Fun" and "For Glory", that contained differing rulesets aimed at casual and competitive players, respectively. In Ultimate, players can play ranked battles to accrue "Global Smash Power", unlocking the "Elite Smash" mode once they pass a certain threshold.

== Characters ==
Each game in the series has a number of playable characters (referred to in the games as "fighters") taken from various gaming franchises, with over 80 in total across the series. Starting with Super Smash Bros. Brawl, characters from non-Nintendo franchises began to make playable appearances. In Super Smash Bros. for Nintendo 3DS and Wii U, players were able to customize existing fighters with altered movesets and abilities, as well as making their own Mii fighters that can be given three different fighting styles. There are also other non-playable characters that take the form of enemies, bosses, and summonable power-up items.

== Music ==
Super Smash Bros. features music from some of Nintendo's popular gaming franchises. While many are newly arranged for the game, some songs are taken directly from their sources. The music for the Nintendo 64 game was composed by Hirokazu Ando, who later returned as sound and music director in Melee. Melee also features tracks composed by Tadashi Ikegami, Shougo Sakai, and Takuto Kitsuta. Brawl featured the collaboration of 38 contracted composers, including Final Fantasy series composer Nobuo Uematsu, who composed the main theme. Like in Brawl, Super Smash Bros. for Nintendo 3DS and Wii U featured many original and re-arranged tracks from various different gaming franchises from a variety of different composers and arrangers. Both versions have multiple musical tracks that can be selected and listened to using the returning "My Music" feature, including pieces taken directly from earlier Super Smash Bros. games. The 3DS and Switch games allow players to listen to their music from the sound menu while the system is in sleep/handheld mode. Ultimate continued the trend of multiple composers and arrangers working on remixed tracks, having over 800 in total.

Three soundtrack albums for the series have been released. An album with the original music for Super Smash Bros. was released in Japan by Teichiku Records in 2000. In 2003, Nintendo released Smashing...Live!, a live orchestrated performance of various pieces featured in Melee by the New Japan Philharmonic. A two-disc promotional soundtrack titled A Smashing Soundtrack was available for Club Nintendo members who registered both the 3DS and Wii U games between November 21, 2014, and January 13, 2015.

== Merchandising ==
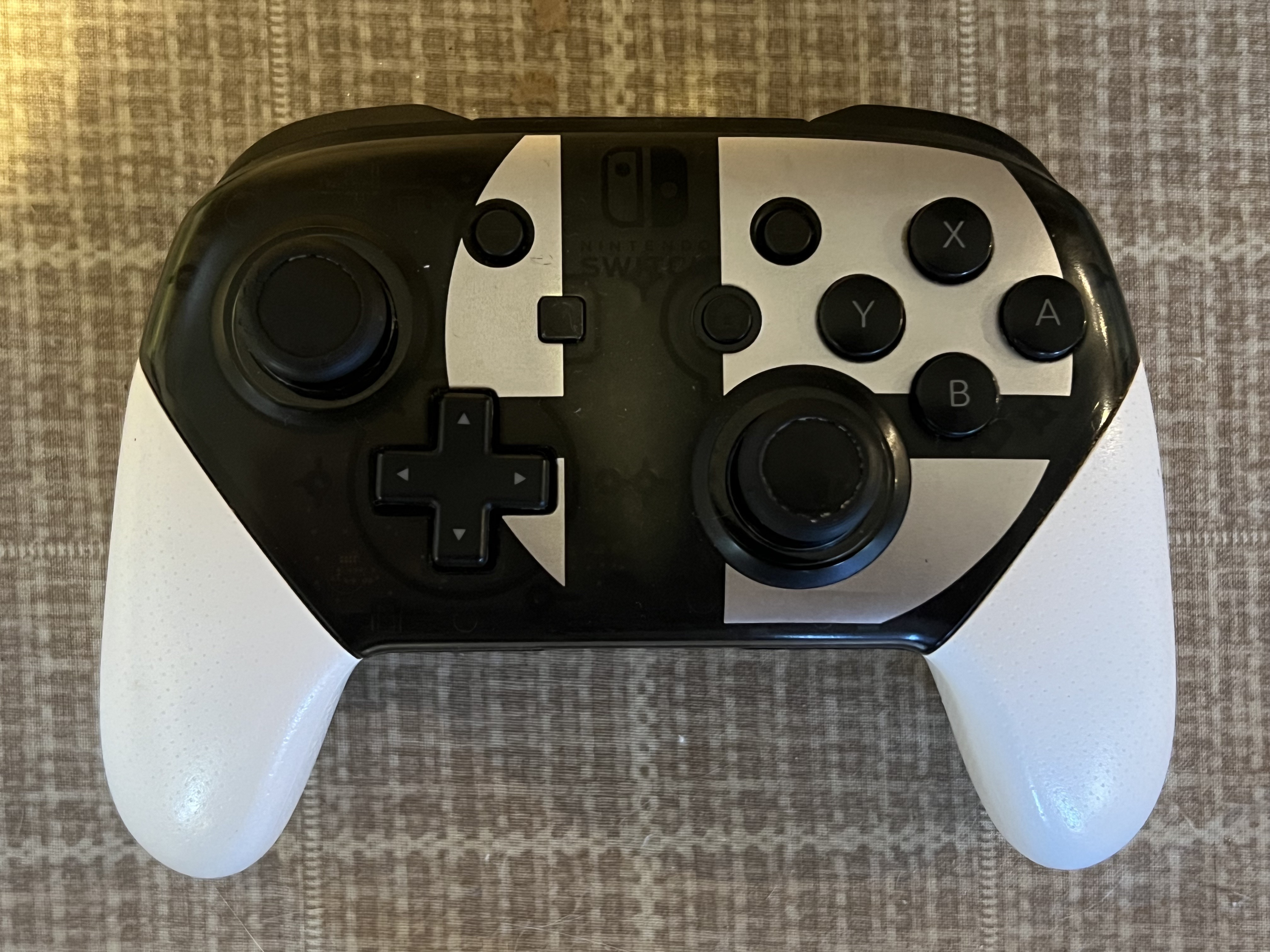
A Smash-themed Nintendo Switch Pro Controller released with Ultimate

Releasing merchandise for Super Smash Bros. of any kind is generally prohibited, with only free giveaways and limited edition items allowed. Practically the only exceptions to the merchandise ban are Amiibo figures, a toys-to-life platform created by Nintendo. Amiibo debuted alongside Super Smash Bros. for Wii U, and Nintendo released Amiibo figures for Smash 4 and Ultimate of all characters present in the games, and the Smash line concluded in February 2024 with the release of the Sora figure. Amiibo figures from the Smash line as well as figures of Smash characters from other lines can interact with Smash 4 and Ultimate using near-field communication, and players can train a computer player based on their Amiibo figure in-game, with the Amiibo player gaining experience points and leveling up as it fights in battles.

To coincide with the releases of Smash 4 and Ultimate, Nintendo released new versions of the GameCube controller, as well as adapters allowing the controller to be used with the Wii U and Switch. Ahead of Ultimate's release, Nintendo released a Smash Ultimate-themed limited edition Nintendo Switch system, with the Switch's dock featuring artwork of the game's characters and its Joy-Con controllers featuring the series logo. Nintendo also bundled Ultimate with a Smash-themed Nintendo Switch Pro Controller and a copy of the game packaged in a steelbook.

== Competitive play ==
While some tournaments and competitive events were held for the first Smash game around its release, a significant competitive Super Smash Bros. community began to emerge in 2002, after the release of Melee. The community largely emerged through decentralized grassroots efforts, without official support from Nintendo. The competitive Melee community gradually united through websites like Smashboards, an online forum created to discuss the Smash series prior to Melee's release. Competitive Melee gradually developed a self-sufficient community, and in 2004 Major League Gaming (MLG) began hosting Melee esports competitions, creating a tournament circuit for the game. MLG's Melee tournaments brought about an era called the "Golden Age of Melee", with some of the game's best players, including Ken Hoang, becoming well known.

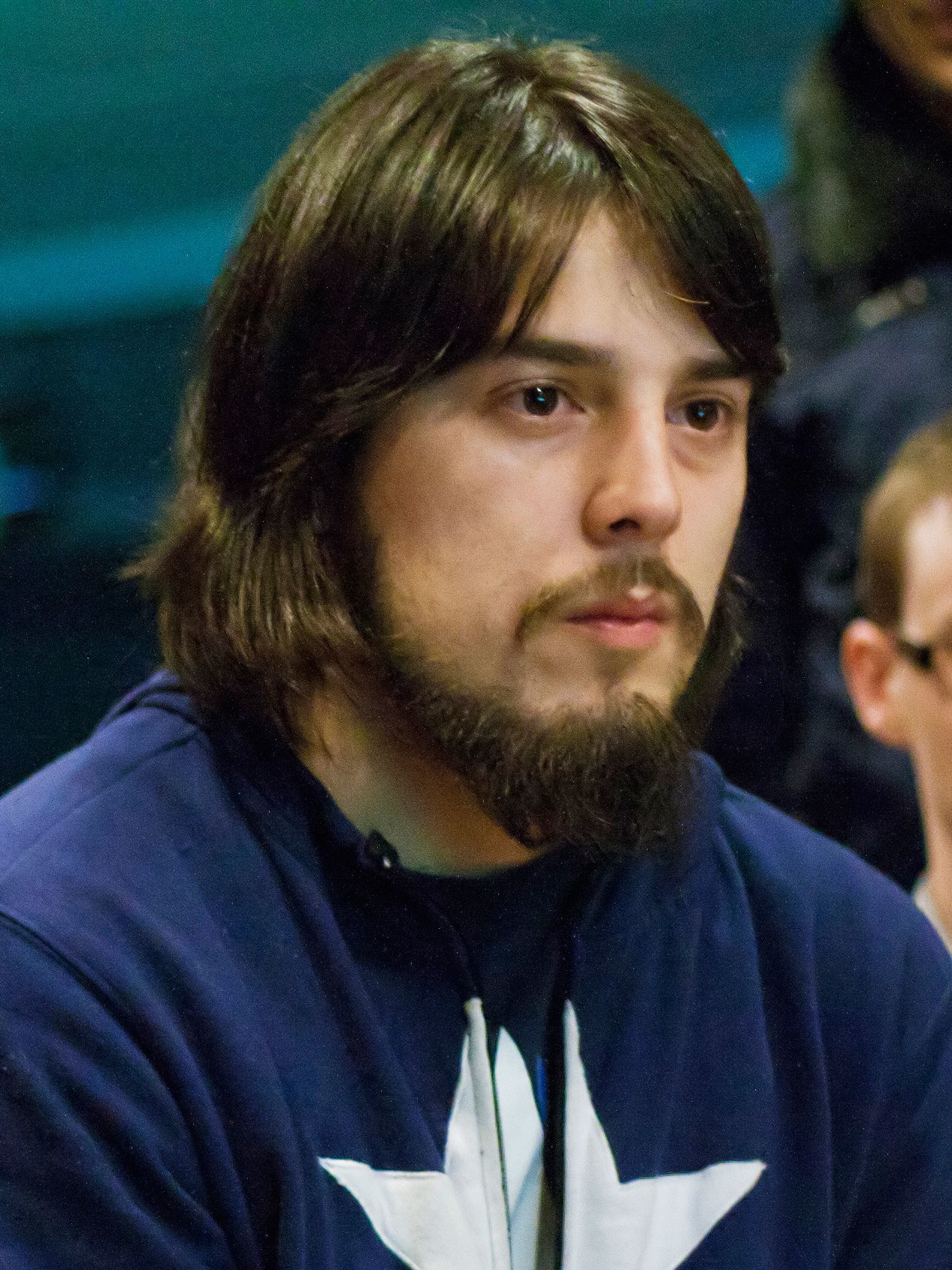
Joseph Marquez, known as "Mang0", won the Melee tournament at EVO 2013.

MLG ended its Melee circuit in 2007 due to the release of Brawl, and much of the attention given to Melee was diverted to its sequel. Gameplay changes in Brawl aimed at appealing to casual players, however, made it less popular among competitive players, and the competitive community gradually returned to Melee. In 2013, members of the Melee community rallied for the game's inclusion at the 2013 edition of the Evolution Championship Series (EVO), an annual fighting game tournament. Nintendo intervened, seeking to cancel the Melee tournament, but allowed the event to proceed after significant backlash. The tournament was won by Joseph "Mang0" Marquez, who had made his breakout Melee performance at EVO 2007—the last time a Smash game was featured—where he placed third.

Melee's appearance at EVO 2013 vastly increased its competitive popularity, and was raised further later that year when Travis Beauchamp released The Smash Brothers, a documentary series about Melee's competitive history. The Smash Brothers documentary covered the community's history at past MLG and EVO events, and contributed to Melee overtaking Brawl's competitive popularity. It was released during a time in which five players—collectively termed Melee's "Five Gods"—were dominating Melee tournaments: Marquez, Jason "Mew2King" Zimmerman, Juan "Hungrybox" DeBiedma, Adam "Armada" Lindgren, and Kevin "PPMD" Nanney.

Melee was included again at EVO 2014 the next year, though Brawl was excluded from the final tournament despite its appearance alongside Melee in qualifying events. Attempting to capitalize on the Smash series's renewed competitive popularity, Nintendo hosted an invitational tournament for the then-upcoming Super Smash Bros. for Wii U at E3 2014, featuring top players of both Melee and Brawl. The tournament was won by Gonzalo "ZeRo" Barrios, who was then among the best competitive Brawl players. Barrios went on to dominate the first year of competitive Smash 4, winning 55 consecutive tournaments from the game's release until October 2015, when he lost to Nairoby "Nairo" Quezada. The release of Smash 4 brought further growth to the competitive Smash community, and in 2016 the tournaments Genesis 3 and EVO 2016 had more entrants than any other Smash competitions until that point.

In 2016, players like William "Leffen" Hjelte began to challenge the Five Gods' dominance of Melee. In 2018, Justin "Plup" McGrath won the Melee tournament at Genesis 5, which Hjelte proclaimed marked the end of the Five Gods era. Earlier that year, Barrios retired from competitive Smash 4 to focus on livestreaming, and Leonardo "MKLeo" López Pérez was Smash 4's top-ranked player by the time Ultimate released in 2018. Ultimate attracted a large competitive audience, including from some Melee players unsatisfied with Brawl or Smash 4. Pérez was considered the best Ultimate player after the game's release, defeating Gavin "Tweek" Dempsey to win EVO 2019, then the largest-ever Smash tournament.

The COVID-19 pandemic disrupted Smash competition, leading to the cancellation of many tournaments. Ultimate was cut from EVO 2020, and Nintendo later opted for Smash not to return to EVO following the tournament's purchase by Sony Interactive Entertainment in 2021. During the #MeToo movement in mid-2020, competitive Smash players, including Quezada and Barrios, faced a wave of sexual misconduct allegations. Nintendo called the alleged acts "absolutely impermissible", furthering rifts between the company and the Smash community. Tensions escalated later in 2020, when Nintendo ordered The Big House to cancel their Melee tournament for its use of Slippi, an unofficial mod that adds online multiplayer to the game, and Smash fans began the #FreeMelee movement on social media to protest Nintendo's decision. Nintendo had provided little support to the Smash community even as it began hosting esports events for its other games, including Splatoon and Arms (2017); as a result, Smash tournaments have much lower prize pools than other major esports.

In late 2021, Nintendo partnered with esports organization Panda Global to produce the Panda Cup, a tournament circuit for both Ultimate and Melee in 2022, which was seen as a sign of Nintendo's willingness to engage further with the Smash community. In December 2022, the Smash World Tour (SWT), a competing Smash circuit, said it would cancel its 2022 finale and 2023 circuit because of a request from Nintendo. Nintendo denied requesting the SWT's cancellation and rejected the SWT's claims that Panda had sought to undermine the SWT. In the aftermath, Panda removed Alan Bunney as its CEO and indefinitely postponed the Panda Cup finale, while all affiliated professional Smash players left the organization.

== Reception ==
Sales and aggregate review scores As of November 6, 2025.
| Game | Year | Sales (in millions) | Metacritic (out of 100) | OpenCritic (recommended) |
|---|---|---|---|---|
| Super Smash Bros. | 1999 | 5.55 | 79 | — |
| Melee | 2001 | 7.09 | 92 | — |
| Brawl | 2008 | 13.32 | 93 | — |
| for Nintendo 3DS | 2014 | 9.63 | 85 | 86% |
| for Wii U | 2014 | 5.38 | 92 | 100% |
| Ultimate | 2018 | 36.24 | 93 | 97% |

Reviews for the Super Smash Bros. series are usually positive. The multiplayer mode in every game is usually highly praised; however, single-player modes have not always been viewed as highly.

Super Smash Bros. received praise for its multiplayer mode. Nintendo Power listed the series as being one of the greatest multiplayer experiences in Nintendo history, describing it as infinitely replayable due to its special moves and close-quarters combat. There were criticisms, however, such as the game's scoring being difficult to follow. In addition, the single-player mode was criticized for its perceived difficulty and lack of features.

Super Smash Bros. Melee generally received a positive reception from reviewers, most of whom credited Melee's expansion of gameplay features from Super Smash Bros. Focusing on the additional features, GameSpy commented that "Melee really scores big in the 'we've added tons of great extra stuff' department." Reviewers compared the game favorably to Super Smash Bros. IGN's Fran Mirabella III stated that it was "in an entirely different league than the N64 version"; GameSpot's Miguel Lopez praised the game for offering an advanced "classic-mode" compared to its predecessor, while detailing the Adventure Mode as "really a hit-or-miss experience." Despite a mixed response to the single-player modes, most reviewers expressed the game's multiplayer mode as a strong component of the game. In their review of the game, GameSpy stated that "you'll have a pretty hard time finding a more enjoyable multiplayer experience on any other console."

Brawl received a perfect score from the Japanese magazine Famitsu. The reviewers praised the variety and depth of the single-player content, the unpredictability of Final Smashes, and the dynamic fighting styles of the characters. Thunderbolt Games gave the game 10 out of 10, calling it "a vastly improved entry into the venerable series". Chris Slate of Nintendo Power also awarded Brawl a perfect score in its March 2008 issue, calling it "one of the very best games that Nintendo has ever produced". IGN critic Matt Casamassina, in his February 11 Wii-k in Review podcast, noted that although Brawl is a "solid fighter", it does have "some issues that need to be acknowledged", including "long loading times" and repetition in The Subspace Emissary.

Super Smash Bros. for 3DS and Super Smash Bros. for Wii U both garnered critical praise and were commercially successful, holding ratings of 85/100 and 92/100 on Metacritic and 86.10% and 92.39% on GameRankings. Reviewers have particularly noted the large, diverse character roster, the improvements to game mechanics, and the variety of multiplayer options. Some criticisms in the 3DS version include a lack of single-player modes and issues concerning the 3DS hardware, such as the size of characters on the smaller screen when zoomed out and latency issues during both local and online multiplayer. There were also reports of players damaging their 3DS Circle Pads while playing the game excessively. The Wii U version's online play quality was mildly criticized for some inconsistency, but has overall been critically acclaimed. Daniel Dischoff of GameRevolution stated "It's true that Super Smash Bros. evolves every time with regard to new features, items, and characters to choose from. While your favorite character may not return or a few annoying pickups may force you to turn off items altogether, this represents the biggest leap forward Smashers have seen yet." Daniel Starky at GameSpot criticized the inconsistent online performance in the game, but still called it an "incredible game", noting "With the Wii U release, Smash Bros. has fully realized its goals." Jose Otero from IGN, praising the replayability of the game, states "Nearly every aspect of Smash Wii U seems fine-tuned not only to appeal to the nostalgia of long-time Nintendo fans, but also to be accessible to new players."

=== Sales ===
Super Smash Bros. sold 1.4 million copies in Japan, and 2.3 million in the U.S., with a total of 5.55 million units worldwide. Melee sold over 7 million units worldwide, becoming the best-selling GameCube game. Brawl sold 1.524 million units in Japan as of March 30, 2008, and sold 1.4 million units in its first week in the United States, becoming Nintendo of America's fastest selling game. The 3DS version sold over a million copies in its first weekend on sale in Japan, and has sold more than 9.63 million copies worldwide as of September 2021. Super Smash Bros. for Wii U became the fastest-selling Wii U game to date, selling 3.39 million units worldwide within just two months of availability, beating the record previously held by Mario Kart 8. As of September 2021, it has sold 5.38 million copies worldwide. Super Smash Bros. Ultimate on Nintendo Switch has set new record highs for the series and for the system. It sold an estimate of 5.6 million copies in global sales during its first week of launch, beating out records previously held by games such as Pokémon: Let's Go, Pikachu! and Let's Go, Eevee!, Super Mario Odyssey, and The Legend of Zelda: Breath of the Wild. In Japan, Ultimate outsold the records held by Super Smash Bros. for Nintendo 3DS with 2.6 million copies sold in five weeks. It is also the third best-selling game for the Nintendo Switch and the best-selling fighting game of all time, with 38.14 million copies sold worldwide as of June 30, 2026.

== Legacy ==
Super Smash Bros. is often credited with popularizing the platform fighter subgenre, notably by defining core mechanics such as an emphasis on ground movement and knocking characters into blast zones by accumulating damage percentages as opposed to traditional knockouts, which would subsequently be iterated on by games that would follow its release. Beginning in the mid-2010s, numerous independent developers took inspiration from the Smash series when creating their own variations of platform fighting games, notably including Rivals of Aether (2017), which according to lead designer and former competitive Smash Bros. player Dan Fornace, took specific inspiration from the faster, skill-based pacing of Super Smash Bros. Melee (2001). Other indie titles such as Brawlhalla and Brawlout (both 2017) have also been favorably compared to Super Smash Bros. by multiple gaming news outlets, with the latter being remarked upon for its focus on more aggressive mechanics reminiscent of traditional fighting games within the Smash Bros. template, while Brawlhalla was praised for incorporating stronger weapon-based gameplay systems, leading to a more functionally diverse character roster.

Given its nature as a crossover for various gaming properties, the Super Smash Bros. series has inspired numerous other crossover fighters involving licensed franchises, that employ similar gameplay and presentation. In 2012, Sony Computer Entertainment published PlayStation All-Stars Battle Royale for PlayStation 3 and PlayStation Vita, which was a conceptually similar platform fighter incorporating various PlayStation and third-party franchises in four-player timed and stock-based battles, set across 2D arenas with stage hazards. Nickelodeon All-Star Brawl, a series of console fighting games by Ludiosity and Fair Play Labs, which spun out of the Nickelodeon Super Brawl line of browser and mobile games, features various characters from Nickelodeon animated series and follows similar gameplay conventions to Super Smash Bros., with the addition of differentiated light and heavy attacks similar to traditional fighting games being a notable distinction between All-Star Brawl and Smash. MultiVersus, which went into early access in 2022 ahead of a wide release in 2024, adopts the broader mechanics and presentation of Super Smash Bros. while utilizing various Warner Bros. film and television franchises, and includes features unique to its systems such as granting characters passive abilities in combat and having dedicated PvE modes. Outside general crossover fighting games modeled after Super Smash Bros., indie fighting games such as Brawlhalla and Rivals of Aether have routinely collaborated with third-party publishers to include their characters as guest fighters in a similar manner to Smash's inclusion of characters from non-Nintendo games. Despite higher-profile Super Smash Bros. alternatives garnering decent critical or commercial reception, they have generally been regarded as inferior substitutes when measured against the gameplay, roster and features of the aforementioned series.
