= Smash World Tour =

Annual Super Smash Bros. tournament circuit

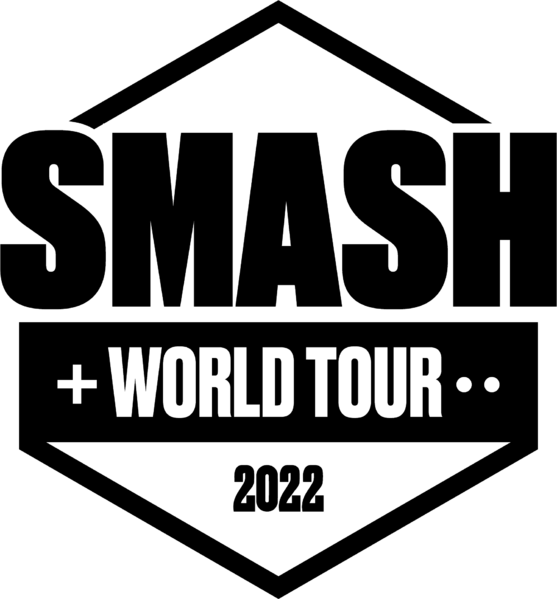
- Official logo of the 2022 Smash World Tour
- Game: Super Smash Bros. Melee; Super Smash Bros. Ultimate
- Founded: March 1, 2020
- First season: 2020
- Folded: November 29, 2022
- Owner: Smash World Tour
- Commissioner: Calvin "GimR" Lofton; Matthew "Aposl" Lofton; Justin Wykowski
- Last champions: Plup (Melee); MkLeo (Ultimate)
- Website: smashworldtour.com

The Smash World Tour (SWT) was an annual Super Smash Bros. tournament circuit operating all around the world, but based in the United States. It took place three consecutive years from 2020 to 2022, although only the 2021 edition was completed fully, and mostly consisted of a series of tournaments aiming to determine a number of players qualifying for the Smash World Championships, major singles tournaments for both Super Smash Bros. Melee and Super Smash Bros. Ultimate; the Championships themselves acted as the culmination of the tour, with the crowning of world champions for both games.

The inaugural 2020 edition of the tournament was announced on March 1, 2020; however the COVID-19 pandemic forced the cancellation of all offline Super Smash Bros. tournaments, and therefore the premature end of the tournament mid-March. It returned the following year, successfully completing, and returned once again in 2022. The 2021 Championship's prize pool of a combined $150,000 remains one of the highest prize pools for any event in Super Smash Bros. history, and the 2022 Championship's prize pool of $250,000 was set to be the highest in history. In total, the 2022 Smash World Tour included over 6,400 offline tournaments and featured over 325,000 players, making it the largest tour in the history of esports.

On November 29, 2022, less than two weeks before the 2022 Smash World Championships, SWT organizers announced the abrupt cancellation of both the 2022 Championships and the 2023 Smash World Tour, claiming to have been forced to shut down by Super Smash Bros. publisher Nintendo. As part of their statement, they also accused Alan Bunney, the CEO and owner of Panda, another esports organization, of severe misconduct against the community, including efforts to sabotage the Smash World Tour in favor of the Panda Cup, a competing circuit organized by Panda which, unlike the SWT, was officially licensed by Nintendo. The announcement caused a major controversy in the competitive Super Smash Bros. community, and resulted in near-universal condemnation against both Nintendo, which denied some of the accusations and did not address the others, and Panda, which denied all accusations safe from one occurrence of misconduct from Bunney. Following further backslash, which saw a wave of resignations from Panda employees and many top players deciding to boycott the upcoming Panda Cup Finale, Panda announced the resignation of Bunney as CEO (but not owner) and the postponement of the Panda Cup Finale.

== History ==
=== 2020 ===
The Smash World Tour was created by siblings Calvin "GimR" Lofton and Matthew "Aposl" Lofton, founders of the longstanding Super Smash Bros. tournament organization VGBootCamp, and Justin Wykowski, a producer for Super Smash Con. After announcement, Calvin said that the Smash World Tour was "the next step to push Smash toward a tier one esport", and making the game more profitable for tournament organizers (TOs) and competitors. While the tour was partnered with Twitch and the fighting game website start.gg, it had not waited to partner with Nintendo, which The Washington Post deemed to have "mired past attempts" at creating prominent Super Smash Bros. circuits; however, the organizers were having active discussions with Nintendo—Wykowski said that the team's "goal was to go ahead and create something that then [can be presented] to Nintendo as an opportunity to be able to work with the Smash community directly".

However, the spread of the COVID-19 pandemic led the Smash World Tour to cancel all of its major events for March and April 2020 mid-March, and eventually all events for the rest of the year; only two relatively small tournaments took place before the cancellation, the 86-entrants Don't Stomp On Me and the 39-entrants SoCal The Hype, both on March 14, 2020.

=== 2021 ===
The 2021 edition of the tour was announced on February 20, 2021. Once again, the circuit partnered with Twitch, but not with Nintendo. The originally planned prize pool for both games combined was $210,000 (including the money prizes for qualification tournaments prior to the Championship), the highest prize pool in Super Smash Bros. history; the prize pool for the Championships alone was $150,000, making it the largest prize pool for a single event in Super Smash Bros. history: the prize pool was $75,000 for each game.

As part of the 2021 tour, 19 events specifically created for the tour took place, including 11 "Qualifiers", Ultimate-exclusive online open tournaments, six "Regional Finals", 16-players invitational featuring selected players for Melee, and players who qualified via the Qualifier tournaments for Ultimate. The final two events were the Last Chance Qualifier event to determine the final entrants of the Smash World Championship, the circuit's final event. The switch from the original system making independent tournaments part of the tour via a point system to a series of events dedicated solely to the circuit where offline tournaments would have a limited number of players, took place in order to make the event possible in the context of the COVID-19 pandemic, although the organizers hoped to resume using the 2020 format the following year.

The pandemic still caused a number of issues: both Oceania Regional Finals were cancelled, with Australian players Sora and Jdizzle selected as Oceania representatives for Melee and Ultimate respectively due to being ranked #1 in Australia for their respective games. Due to the state of the pandemic in South America, the Ultimate Regional Finals in the region where held online, while Melee's were cancelled entirely, with a panel directly selecting Chilean players Chape and HP to represent the region at the Championship. The East Asia Regional Finals, which took place in Japan and were meant to feature players who had qualified via either the Japan Qualifier and East Asia South Qualifier, encountered significant issues as none of the qualified East Asia South players (all from Hong Kong, the Philippines, Singapore, or South Korea) were able to travel to Japan for it. As such, Hong Kong player XIFL, who had taken first place in the East Asia South Qualifiers, directly qualified for the Championship, and the number of qualifying Championship spots for the now all-Japanese East Asia Regional Finals was reduced from 6 to 5.

The 2021 Smash World Tour culminated with the Smash World Championships on December 17–19, 2021, featuring 40 players in both the Melee and Ultimate tournaments. American player Plup became the inaugural Melee world champion, and Mexican player MkLeo becoming the inaugural Ultimate world champion.

=== 2022 ===
The 2022 edition of the Smash World Tour was announced on March 9, 2022. It marked the return of the original planned 2022 format, using a point system applicable to many tournaments part of the tour and working with the Smash World Tour, but unlike tournaments part of the 2021 tour, not organized directly by them. The organizers once again partnered with Twitch, with new partner online coaching platform Metafy. The prize pool for the Smash World Championship at the end of the tour was $250,000, beating the previous year's $150,000 record for biggest event prize pool in Super Smash Bros. history. Platinum and Gold events, the highest tier ratings for the tour, took place in countries whose Super Smash Bros. scenes usually receive little attention internationally, such as Brazil, Cuba, Qatar, and South Korea.

The tour officially started with Virtuocity Smash Open 2022, a Gold-tier tournament taking place on March 17–19, 2022 in Doha, Qatar, although several tournaments dating as early as March 12 were retroactively recognized as Silver-tier events. In total, the 2022 Smash World Tour included over 6,400 offline tournaments, and featured over 325,000 players. The completion of the gold-tier tournament Apex 2022 on November 20, 2022, the final event of the tour before the Last Chance Qualifiers and Championships, marked the end of the points ranking competition, and the confirmation of the 30 qualified players for each game (not counting two future final two Last Chance Qualifier qualified players); American player Hungrybox topped the ranks for Melee, while MkLeo topped the ranks for Ultimate.

=== Cancellation ===
On November 29, 2022, less than two weeks before the Championships were scheduled to begin, the organizers of the Smash World Tour announced that both the Melee and Ultimate Championships had been cancelled, prematurely ending the Smash World Tour 2022, as well as announcing that the circuit would not return in 2023. In their statement, they claimed to have had multiple conversations with Nintendo regarding an official license for the Smash World Tour, and that Nintendo appeared supportive, though a license had not been granted before the 2022 circuit had begun. They claimed that on November 23, Nintendo had informed them that a license would not be granted for either the 2022 Championships or the 2023 circuit, and that Nintendo had told them that the lack of a license meant the events were not allowed to operate. Smash World Tour accused Alan Bunney, then-CEO of the esports organization Panda, of encouraging tournament organizers to join the Panda Cup—an officially licensed circuit run by Panda—rather than the Smash World Tour, and using his partnership with Nintendo to threaten others with a cease and desist order should they not comply. Smash World Tour further stated that Bunney attempted to seize broadcasting rights from the organization Beyond the Summit, which was corroborated by David "LD" Gorman, the organization's co-founder.

After a request for comment from Kotaku, Nintendo responded, saying they "were unable to come to an agreement" with the Smash World Tour for a license in 2023, though Nintendo "did not request any changes to or cancellation of remaining events in 2022, including the 2022 Championships event, considering the negative impact on the players who were already planning to participate". Smash World Tour disputed this, saying that Nintendo had confirmed that the 2022 Championships and 2023 circuit were not to proceed, and that Nintendo acknowledged all potential impacts of the cancellation, including "some positive, some negative, and some really negative". According to Smash World Tour, Nintendo claimed that a license be granted "well in advance" of a public announcement in order for commercial events to be operated featuring Nintendo's intellectual property, and that the Smash World Tour had failed both health and safety guidelines and "internal partner guidelines", meaning Nintendo would be unable to grant a license for any upcoming Smash World Tour activity. In a second statement to IGN on December 2, Nintendo said that they "let [the Smash World Tour] know verbally that [Nintendo was] not requiring they cancel the 2022 finals event", as well as reaffirming their commitment to Panda as a partner. Smash World Tour stated that the timeline of Nintendo's actions were illogical if they intended to allow the Championships proceed.

The same day, Panda published a statement denying their involvement in the cancellation of the Championships. They also denied most of the accusations against Bunney, though they acknowledged that the dispute between him and Beyond the Summit did occur, and that he "spoke in a manner that did not reflect either guidance from Nintendo or our own standards". After a wave of internal resignations and a growing number of players boycotting the Panda Cup Finale, Panda announced on December 5 that Bunney was no longer CEO, and that the Finale had been postponed "due to security concerns". Bunney claimed on the next day that he had resigned "to protect the safety and wellbeing of the [Panda] team", and that he would release a statement in the future with evidence that Smash World Tour's statement was untruthful and Beyond the Summit's leadership "put the [Smash Bros.] community in jeopardy".

==== Response from the community ====
SWT's original announcement led to strong backlash and condemnation from both Super Smash Bros. players and fans towards both Bunney and Nintendo, with many calling for a boycott of Panda events.

On the same day as the SWT statement, VGBootCamp, one of the main organizations behind the Smash World Tour, announced that "based on our recent communications with Nintendo, we would be putting ourselves at further risk if we continued forward with our current plans", that they were unsure of the future of their company due to these communications, and were forced to cancel the upcoming major tournaments Glitch: Duel of Fates and Double Down 2023, leading to further backlash against Nintendo.

Following SWT's statement, players and fans near-universally decided to boycott the Panda Cup Finale, the event acting as the culmination of the Panda Cup circuit. Many top players qualified for the event, both on the Melee and Ultimate sides, publicly announced that they would not be attending the event as a result of SWT's allegations.

Esports organization AITX eSports claimed they would not support Panda or their events in the future, stating "This community is the lifeblood of the game and we're are deeply saddened to see the efforts of @SmashWorldTour wasted." Player and tournament organizer Aiden "Calvin" McCaig claimed that he would not attend any future event licensed by either Nintendo or Panda in the future, accusing Nintendo of using Panda as "a means to the end of controlling the scene, choking our last drops of independence from us as a community."

Public response to Panda's December 2 statement was negative, and more players announced their intention to boycott the Panda Cup Finale. Bunney's claim in December 5 that he would come forward with evidence of wrongdoing from both SWT and BTS was largely mocked by the community.

Reactions from players and talent employed by Panda was negative, and many Panda employees resigned from the company in the days following the December 2 response. Those departures included top Super Smash Bros. players iBDW, Plup and WaDi, and prominent commentators Coney, TKBreezy and VikkiKitty.

On December 2, popular streamer and tournament organizer Ludwig announced The Scuffed World Tour, an invitational tournament for both Melee and Ultimate conceived as a counter-event to the Panda Cup Finale and a spiritual successor to the Smash World Tour (with "Scuffed World Tour" also making the initials "SWT"), scheduled to overlap with the grand finals of the Panda Cup Finale. For both games, invites were extended to 8 players with the most points in the Smash World Tour 2022, and all money raised by the event was pledged to VGBootCamp; several Panda Cup Finale-qualified players expressed interest in attending Ludwig's event instead, and with the eventual postponing of the Panda Cup Finale, the event is no longer planned to take place concurrently with The Scuffed World Tour.

== Format ==
=== 2020 and 2022 ===
The 2020 and 2022 editions of the circuit followed a point-based format. Tournaments part of the tour would receive a tier, with each giving a number of points to its highest-placing players; when all other tournaments would conclude, the highest-placing players would qualify for the Championships, the final event of the tour, to determine the world champion. The tiers were, from highest to lowest, Platinum, Gold, Super Silver (only in 2022), and Silver; each tier gave the same amount of points per tournament result, except for Silver-tier tournaments which received a sub-ranking in 2002 going from Silver 4, the highest, to Silver 1, the lowest. The points do not accumulate without limit: a player's points are limited to their three best in Platinum results, their three best Gold results, their best single Super Silver result, and the six Silver results which earned them the most points. As the tour was fully focused on traditional singles competition, results for doubles tournaments or other forms of Super Smash Bros. competition featured at events part of the Smash World Tour had no impact on points, and only open tournaments were eligible, ruling out invitationals.

For both the Melee and Ultimate tournaments of the ultimately cancelled 2020 Championships, the 31 players with the most points would have qualified, plus one final player who would have qualified via a Last Chance Qualifier tournament taking place on the first day of the event. The 2022 version followed a similar yet different system, also based on points: the highest-scoring player for each of seven territories earned a qualification, with the territories being North America, Central America, Europe, Japan, Oceania, South America, and the "Wild Card Region"; the latter was a spot given to the player with the most points from outside any of the six previous territories. The 23 other players with the most points regardless of territory, and two last players would have been decided via a Last Chance Qualifier, rounding the number of players qualified for the Championships to 32 again. In 2022 tour, the Wild Card Region point leader for Melee was Sala, an American player eligible for the region due to residing and mainly competing in South Korea, while Ultimate's was eMass, a player from Saudi Arabia.

For the 2022 tour, any offline tournament in the world could try to apply for the Smash World Tour as a Silver event, with the organizers accepting or denying their application; all the Platinum and Gold events were decided in advance. Although it did not take place, the 2022 Smash World Championships would have followed a format similar to 2021's. Each game would have had a prize pool of $125,000 split between all participants, from $40,000 to the winners to $500 for the eight players tied for last place (25th).

The confirmation of the players qualified for the Smash World Championships in late November 2022 led to some controversy, as, unlike they had claimed in their original ruleset, the organizers counted points for tournaments players had entered but DQ'd from without actually participating; when the discrepancy was pointed out, the organizers added a clause to the rules stating they could count DQs at their discretion. If the rule had been upheld, Japanese player kept and Chilean player Sekai Doggo would both have qualified for the Ultimate Championship, but instead came up short points-wise.

=== 2021 ===
The 2021 edition used a completely different format due to the COVID-19 pandemic making holding large, open offline tournaments impossible; instead of having pre-existing events be part of the tour, the Smash World Tour organized its own events dedicated to qualification.

To qualify for the Championships, players would have to place high in the Regional Finals, 16-player offline tournaments; each region had a different number of players that would qualify for the Championships at each Regional Finals. To avoid large concentrations of players during the pandemic, Ultimate players had to qualify for the Regional Finals via Qualifiers, large open tournaments held online, while notable Melee players were directly invited to the Regional Finals. Each tournament had eight final entrants joining via the Last Chance Qualifier, making the total number of participants in the Championship 40, instead of 32 like the other years.

The regions for both games are North America East, North America West (for Canada and the United States), Central America (including Mexico, although it is not considered part of Central America), South America, Europe, East Asia, and Oceania. Not counting the Last Chance Qualifier, the 2021 Smash World Championship was divided in two parts. In the first two days, a round-robin phase saw all 40 entrants divided in eight groups of five players who would all face each other, with a double-elimination bracket phase taking place on the third and final day. For each group of the round-robin phase, the player ranked first started the bracket phase in the winners' side, the players ranked 2nd and 3rd would start in losers' side, and the players ranked 4th and 5th would be directly eliminated. The $75,000 prize pool for each game would have been divided between all 40 qualified players, from $20,000 going to the winner to $500 going to the players ranked below the top 24.

In addition to the World Championship and Last Chance Qualifier, a few side-events took place during the event, mainly for players who had participated in the Last Chance Qualifier but failed to qualify: doubles tournaments for both games, a "low tier" tournament (for characters considered lesser on the competitive scene) for Melee, and a Squad Strike tournament for Ultimate.
