= Evo Japan 2018 =

2018 Japanese Evolution Championship Series
Tournament information
- Location: Tokyo, Japan
- Dates: January 26–28, 2018
- Venue(s): Sunshine City (Days 1+2); Akiba Square (Day 3)

Final positions
- Champions: SFVAE: Seon-woo "Infiltration" Lee; GGXrdR2: Nage; T7: Jae-min "Knee" Bae; SSB4: Leonardo "MKLeo" Lopez; BBCF: Shoji "Fenritti" Sho; KOFXIV: Chia-Chen "ZJZ" Tseng; ARMS: Pega

Tournament statistics
- Attendance: ~5,000

The 2018 Japanese Evolution Championship Series, commonly referred to as Evo Japan 2018, was a fighting game event held in Tokyo, Japan on January 26–28. As mentioned in its namesake, the event was the first Evo event to take place in Japan and outside of the United States. The event offered tournaments for various fighting games, such as Street Fighter V, Tekken 7, and Super Smash Bros. for Wii U. Over 5,000 people registered for the event with Street Fighter V and Tekken 7's entrant numbers being on par with their respective Evo 2017 numbers.

== Venue ==
Evo Japan 2018 was the first event in the Evolution Championship Series to take place outside of its usual Las Vegas. Instead it took place in the Japanese city of Tokyo. The first two days of the event took place at Sunshine City while the third day took place at Akiba Square.

== Games ==
Evo Japan 2018 featured seven games in its lineup as announced through a YouTube trailer. The lineup consisted of Street Fighter V: Arcade Edition, Tekken 7, Super Smash Bros. for Wii U, Guilty Gear Xrd REV 2, BlazBlue: Central Fiction, The King of Fighters XIV, and ARMS. The lineup was a reflection of the event's location. The event was the first time that ARMS would be at an Evo event.

There were also many side tournaments at the event with Ultra Street Fighter IV, Vampire Savior (Darkstalkers 3), and Catherine being notable side-events. The event also showcased a playable demo version of Bandai Namco's upcoming fighter Soulcalibur VI.

The event was initially scheduled for May 2011, but was postponed due to the 2011 Tōhoku earthquake and tsunami. The pre-tournament, entitled [sài], featured Tekken 7, Guilty Gear Xrd REV 2, and Super Smash Bros. for Wii U. Street Fighter V's exclusion from [sài] was due to licensing issues which led to the latter of the three being included instead.

== Participants ==
Participation of Evo Japan 2018 was completely free due to the strict laws within Japan. The event featured more than 5,000 players in attendance. Street Fighter V: Arcade Edition received 2,256 entrants, while Tekken 7 and Guilty Gear Xrd REV 2 received over 1,000 entrants. The King of Fighters XIV and BlazBlue: Central Fiction notably had more numbers than their respective Evo 2017 events. Super Smash Bros. for Wii U saw a decrease in entrant numbers from ~1,500 to ~750 which is likely due to the game's huge proliferation of North American professional players.

== Broadcasting ==
Evo Japan 2018 was streamed entirely through Twitch. The streams were viewable in the English, Japanese, and Chinese languages. Capcom also ran their Capcom Fighters stream for Street Fighter V: Arcade Edition. The ARMS finals concluded on Friday while finals for The King of Fighters XIV and BlazBlue: Central Fiction concluded on Saturday. The rest of the lineup concluded on Sunday with Street Fighter V: Arcade Edition being the closing game for the event.

== Tournament Summary ==
The Street Fighter V: Arcade Edition event was won by Seon-woo "Infiltration" Lee who notably took most of the 2017 season off to recalibrate; he double eliminated Ryota "John Takeuchi" Takeuchi to claim the title. The Guilty Gear Xrd REV 2 event was won by Nage who eliminated Evo 2017 champion, Omito Hashimoto in the second set of the grand finals. The Tekken 7 finals were won by Evo 2013 Tekken Tag Tournament 2 champion, Jae-min "Knee" Bae defeating Seong-ho "Chanel" Kang in a runback from Winner's Semi-Finals. The Super Smash Bros. for Wii U event was won by Mexican player, Leonardo "MKLeo" Lopez-Perez with a Marth counterpick against Yuta "Abadango" Kawamura's Bayonetta.

A notable match in the BlazBlue: Central Fiction finals paired Yuta's Es and MokeMoke's Relius against each other. When MokeMoke was down a game and was about to take a game on Yuta, the latter retaliated with a clash mechanic giving him the set win advancing him to loser's finals. In the Guilty Gear Xrd REV 2 event, Mikado Shodai was able to send Omito Hashimoto to the loser's bracket, but then proceeded to get double eliminated in his next two matches.

== Reveals ==
At Evo Japan 2018, SNK revealed Oswald for The King of Fighters XIV along with announcing three more characters for the title that will be DLC released in the month of April 2018. In addition, the company announced Samurai Shodown's Nakoruru as the sixth character for their upcoming fighting game, SNK Heroines Tag Team Frenzy. The company also announced an online version of The King of Fighters '97 entitled The King of Fighters '97: Global Match. Bandai Namco would reveal Nightmare, Kilik, Chai Xianghua, and newcomer Grøh for Soulcalibur VI.

== Results ==
Street Fighter V: Arcade Edition
Place	Player	Alias	Character(s)
1st	(South Korea) Seon-woo Lee	GRPT|Infiltration	Menat, Juri
2nd	(Japan) Ryota Takeuchi	John Takeuchi	Rashid
3rd	(Japan) Daigo Umehara	CYG|Daigo Umehara	Guile
4th	(Japan) Hajime Taniguchi	FOX|Tokido	Akuma
5th	(Hong Kong) Jonny Lai Cheng	HumanBomb	Chun-Li
5th	(Japan) Joe Egami	GRPT|MOV	Chun-Li
7th	(Japan)	stormKUBO	Abigail
7th	(Japan) Hiromiki Kumada	DNG|Itabashi Zangief	Abigail, Zangief

Guilty Gear Xrd REV 2
Place	Player	Alias	Character(s)
1st	(Japan)	Nage	Faust
2nd	(Japan) Omito Hashimoto	Omito	Johnny
3rd	(Japan) Ryota Inoue	GGP|Kazunoko	Raven
4th	(Japan)	Ruki	Dizzy
5th	(Japan) Masahiro Tominaga	TLA|Machabo	Ky
5th	(Japan)	ERG|DC	Sin
7th	(Japan) Yuko Sonoda	Kedako	May
7th	(Japan)	Lox	Jam

Tekken 7
Place	Player	Alias	Character(s)
1st	(South Korea) Jae-min Bae	ROX|Knee	Paul, Bryan, Steve
2nd	(South Korea) Seong-ho Kang	ROX|Chanel	Alisa, Eliza, Lucky Chloe, Akuma
3rd	(South Korea) Chae Dong	NM|Gura	Geese, Lili
4th	(South Korea) Jin-woo Choi	FOX|Saint	Jack-7
5th	(Japan) Takumi Hamasaki	COOAS|Noroma	Jack-7, Dragunov
5th	(South Korea) Im-su Hun	NM|UlsanGoding	Kazumi
7th	(South Korea) Sun-woong Youn	Fursan|LowHigh	Shaheen, Law
7th	(Japan) Aoki Takehiko	Yamasa|Take	Kazumi

Super Smash Bros. for Wii U
Place	Player	Alias	Character(s)
1st	(Mexico) Leonardo Lopez-Perez	FOX|MKLeo	Cloud, Marth
2nd	(Japan) Yuta Kawamura	Abadango	Bayonetta, Mewtwo
3rd	(Japan) Takuto Ono	DNG|Kameme	Mega Man, Cloud, Sheik
4th	(Japan) Yuta Uejima	DNG|Nietono	Sheik, Diddy Kong
5th	(Japan) Toshimasa Hayakawa	Choco	Zero Suit Samus
5th	(Japan) Kengo Suzuki	KEN	Sonic
7th	(Japan) Rei Furukawa	2GG|komorikiri	Cloud, Roy
7th	(Japan)	shky	Zero Suit Samus

BlazBlue: Central Fiction
Place	Player	Alias	Character(s)
1st	(Japan) Shoji Sho	CO|Fenrich	Jin
2nd	(Japan)	Yuta	Es
3rd	(Japan)	Sayakachan-Bot	Es
4th	(Japan)	MokeMoke	Relius
5th	(Japan) Fumihiko Yokobori	Fumi	Litchi, Nine
5th	(Japan) Ryuji Utsumi	BE|DoraBang	Bang, Mu-12
7th	(Japan)	Naoto	Nine, Rachel
7th	(Japan)	Daiwa	Platinum

The King of Fighters XIV
Place	Player	Alias	Character(s)
1st	(Taiwan) Chia-Chen Tseng	HuomaoTV|ZJZ	Kula/Leona/Yuri, Mature/Leona/Yuri
2nd	(Hong Kong) Lau-yuk Sing	Lau	Benimaru/Billy/Mature
3rd	(Japan) Murakami Masanobu	Sanwa|M'	Kula/Robert/Iori, Robert/Benimaru/Iori
4th	(China) Zhuojun Zeng	DouyuTV|Xiao Hai	Kula/Benimaru/Iori
5th	(Hong Kong)	Ball KTB	Yuri/Leona/Mai
5th	(Taiwan) Chia-Hung Lin	HuomaoTV|E.T.	Billy/Benimaru/Leona, Leona/Billy/Zarina
7th	(Japan)	Koukou	Benimaru/Kyo/Iori
7th	(Hong Kong)	Fudoumyouou	Kyo/Iori/Kim

ARMS
Place	Player	Alias	Character(s)
1st	(Japan)	Pega	Max Brass
2nd	(United States) Jonathan Valdes	StDx|GoreMagala	Helix, Max Brass
3rd	(Japan)	Sukuran	Master Mummy
4th	(Canada) Eve Schafer	AotN|Mileve	Mechanica
5th	(Japan)	Khu	Ninjara
5th	(Japan)	Cuvelia	Twintelle
7th	(Japan) Sota Ito	Chateau	Dr. Coyle, Min Min, Misango
7th	(Finland) Nicodemo Coco	Cojora	Kid Cobra

== Aftermath ==
On May 17, 2018, it was revealed that Evo Japan 2018 suffered a loss of over one million dollars. The reasoning is mainly due to its status as a free-to-enter event. According to Joey "Mr. Wizard" Cuellar:

“Japanese law only allows us to pay out 20 times the entry fee, so in order for us to pay out the amount that we want, we have to make the tournament free entry.”

In comparison, Evo 2017 charged $55-$75 for competitor pass depending on when players registered as well as an additional $10 for every game each player wanted to enter. In addition, the first two days of Evo Japan 2018 were free whereas the finals were paid entrance.
