= MkLeo =

Mexican esports player

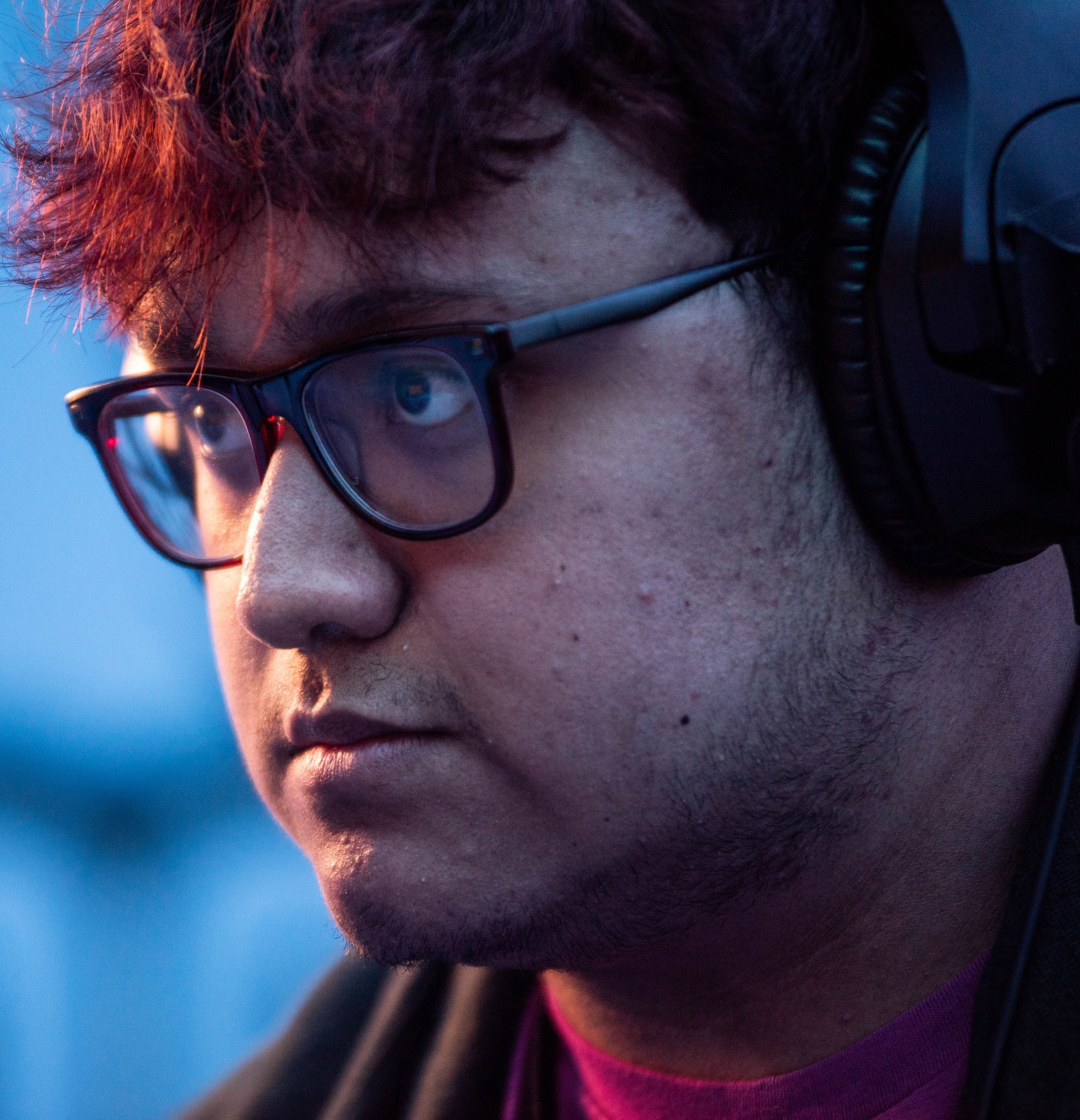
- MKLeo at Frostbite 2020

Personal information
- Name: Leonardo López Pérez
- Nickname(s): MkLeo, Leo
- Born: January 20, 2001 (age 25)
- Nationality: Mexican

Career information
- Games: Super Smash Bros. for Wii U Super Smash Bros. Ultimate
- Playing career: 2009–present

Team history
- 2017–2019: Echo Fox
- 2020–2023: T1
- 2023–present: Luminosity Gaming

Career highlights and awards
- Super Smash Bros. for Wii U (12 majors won): 2x Genesis champion (2017, 2018); 2GGT: ZeRo Saga champion (2016); Umebura Japan Major champion (2017); GameTyrant Expo champion (2017); IBP Masters Showdown champion (2017); 2GG Championship champion (2017); Evo Japan 2018 champion; SwitchFest champion (2018); Get On My Level champion (2018); Community Effort Orlando champion (2018); Super Smash Con champion (2018); Super Smash Bros. Ultimate (28 majors won): 3× Genesis champion (2019, 2022, 2023); 2x Smash Ultimate Summit champion (2019); MomoCon champion (2019); Smash 'N' Splash 5 champion (2019); Community Effort Orlando champion (2019); Evo champion (2019); Super Smash Con champion (2019); Ultimate Fighting Arena champion (2019); 2GG: Kongo Saga champion (2019); Frostbite champion (2020); Riptide champion (2021); Low Tide City champion (2021); Port Priority 6 champion (2021); Mainstage champion (2021); Smash World Tour 2021 champion (2021); Delfino Maza RETA 2022 champion; e-Caribana champion (2022); COLOSSEL 2022 champion; Smash Factor 9 champion (2022); Rise 'N Grind champion (2022); Ludwig Smash Invitational champion (2022); King Con champion (2024); EugeneBound Summers champion (2025); Smash Factor X3 champion (2026); ClashMania 2026 champion (2026)

Leonardo López Pérez (born January 20, 2001), better known as MkLeo and sometimes Leo, is a Mexican professional Super Smash Bros. player. He was the most successful Super Smash Bros. Ultimate player in the world during the pre-COVID era, and was ranked #1 in the Panda Global Rankings for the first and second half of 2019.

Prior to the release of Ultimate, he was ranked as the best player in the world at Super Smash Bros. for Wii U for the first half of 2018.

== Career ==
=== Early life and Super Smash Bros. for Wii U ===
MkLeo won his first Smash Bros. tournament at the age of eight when he took first place at the Super Smash Bros. Brawl competition at Anime Expo Mexico TNT 2009. At 14, he rose to prominence in Super Smash Bros. for Wii U after defeating Ramin "Mr. R" Delshad to win Smash Factor 4, right after Delshad took 2nd place at Evo 2015. He began competing internationally in 2016, culminating with a win at 2GGT: ZeRo Saga in December. At that event, he defeated several of the game's prominent players, including Gonzalo "ZeRo" Barrios, Larry "Larry Lurr" Holland, and James "Void" Makekau-Tyson. Following the win at 2GGT, MkLeo was jointly signed by Echo Fox – who signed him and six other fighting game players at the same time to build the largest roster of fighting game players in esports – and Most Valuable Gaming.

MkLeo, who was not able to obtain a travel visa to attend Genesis 3 at the start of 2016, announced after his win at 2GGT that he would go on to win Genesis 4, which was to be held the next month. At Genesis 4, he again finished in 1st place, defeating Elliot "Ally" Carroza-Oyarce, who had won the Smash tournament at Evo 2016. He was the youngest player to make the top 8 in the tournament series' history. Playing alongside Ally, the pair also won the tournament's doubles competition. MkLeo had mixed results throughout the rest of 2017, with disappointing results including taking 13th place at Frostbite 2017 in February, and 65th place at Evo 2017 in July. However, he won GameTyrant Expo 2017 at the start of October, and took second place at CEO 2017, falling to ZeRo. At the end of the year, MkLeo won the 2GGC Championship, this time defeating ZeRo in the finals, and claimed the tournament's $20,000 first place payout.

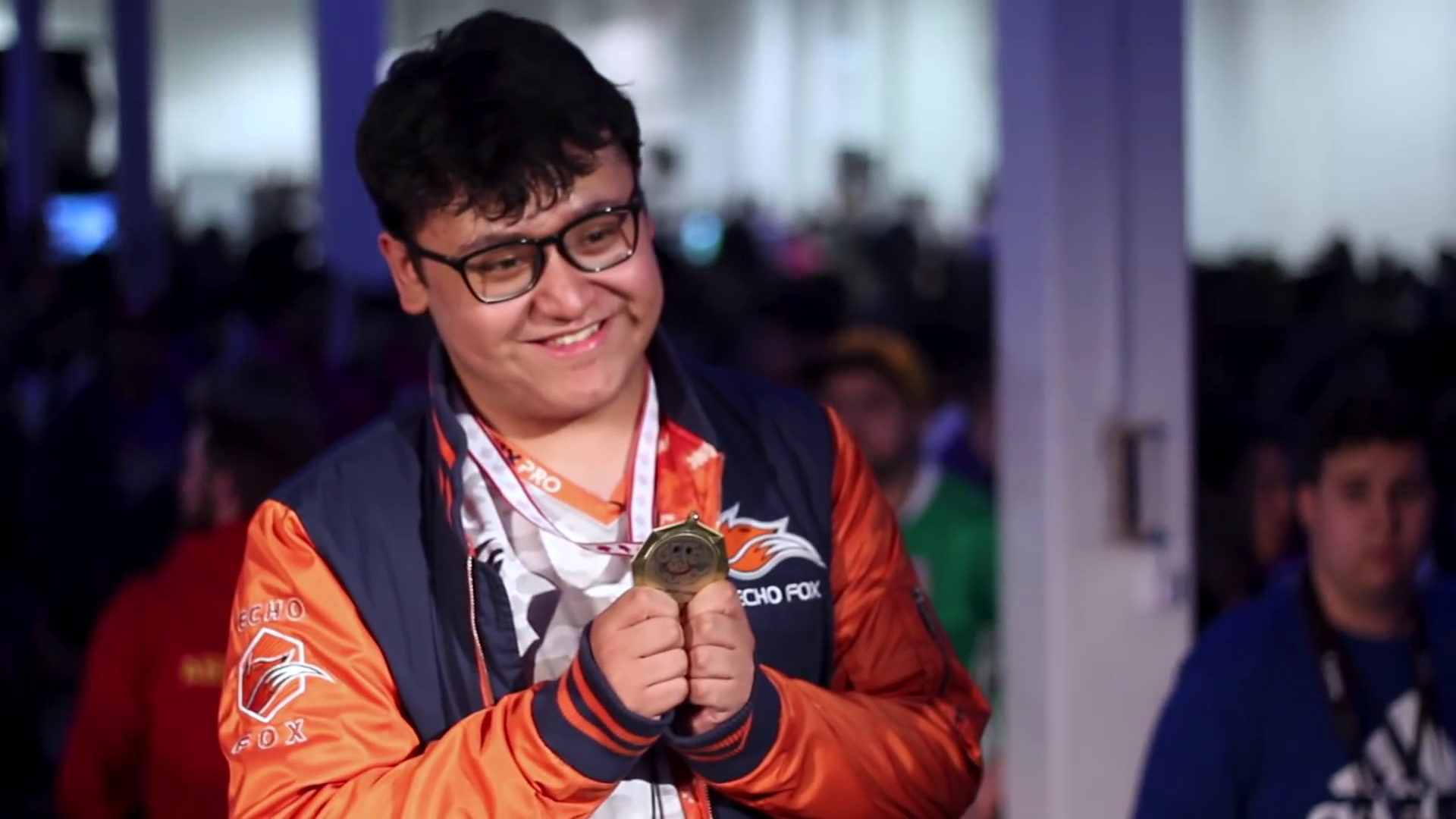
MkLeo placed first at Get On My Level as part of a string of major tournament wins in 2018.

In January 2018, ZeRo announced his retirement from professional Smash competition. As ZeRo had long been considered the best Super Smash Bros. for Wii U player in the world, this created an opening for MkLeo to seize the top spot. He put together a string of impressive performances over the year, including wins at Genesis 5, Evo Japan 2018, CEO 2018, Get On My Level 2018, and SwitchFest 2018. MkLeo was unable to attend Evo 2018 due to chickenpox, but was able to attend Super Smash Con 2018 shortly thereafter, where he claimed another 1st-place finish. These wins resulted in MkLeo taking the top spot in the final bi-annual Panda Global rankings of Wii U players before the release of Ultimate.

In the five semi-annual Panda Global rankings released over the competitive lifespan of Super Smash Bros. for Wii U, MkLeo was ranked 19th, 8th, 2nd, and 4th before taking first place in the final ranking. The Panda Global Rankings 100, which listed the Top 100 Wii U players from the game's release through the release of Ultimate, placed MkLeo as the 3rd best player of all time behind ZeRo and Nairoby "Nairo" Quezada. The final Panda Global rankings for Super Smash Bros. for Wii U listed Marth as the main character that he played and Cloud Strife and Bayonetta as his secondary characters.

=== Super Smash Bros. Ultimate ===
Super Smash Bros. Ultimate was released in December 2018, and MkLeo had strong showings at several tournaments held shortly after the game's launch. He won one of the first Ultimate tournaments, Smash Conference United, and took fourth place at Glitch 6, both in the month of January. The following month, he won Genesis 6, considered the first premier tournament in Ultimate. The win was his third consecutive title at that tournament series and made him a front-runner for best player in the world at the new game. In the first half of 2019 he won three other major tournaments, MomoCon 2019, CEO 2019, and Smash 'N' Splash 5, and placed second in another, Frostbite 2019. His weakest performance in a major tournament came at Umebura Major in Japan, where he placed 33rd; this was also the first tournament where he used Joker, newly released character, competitively. His success against the scene's other top players earned MkLeo the top position in the inaugural Panda Global rankings for Ultimate.

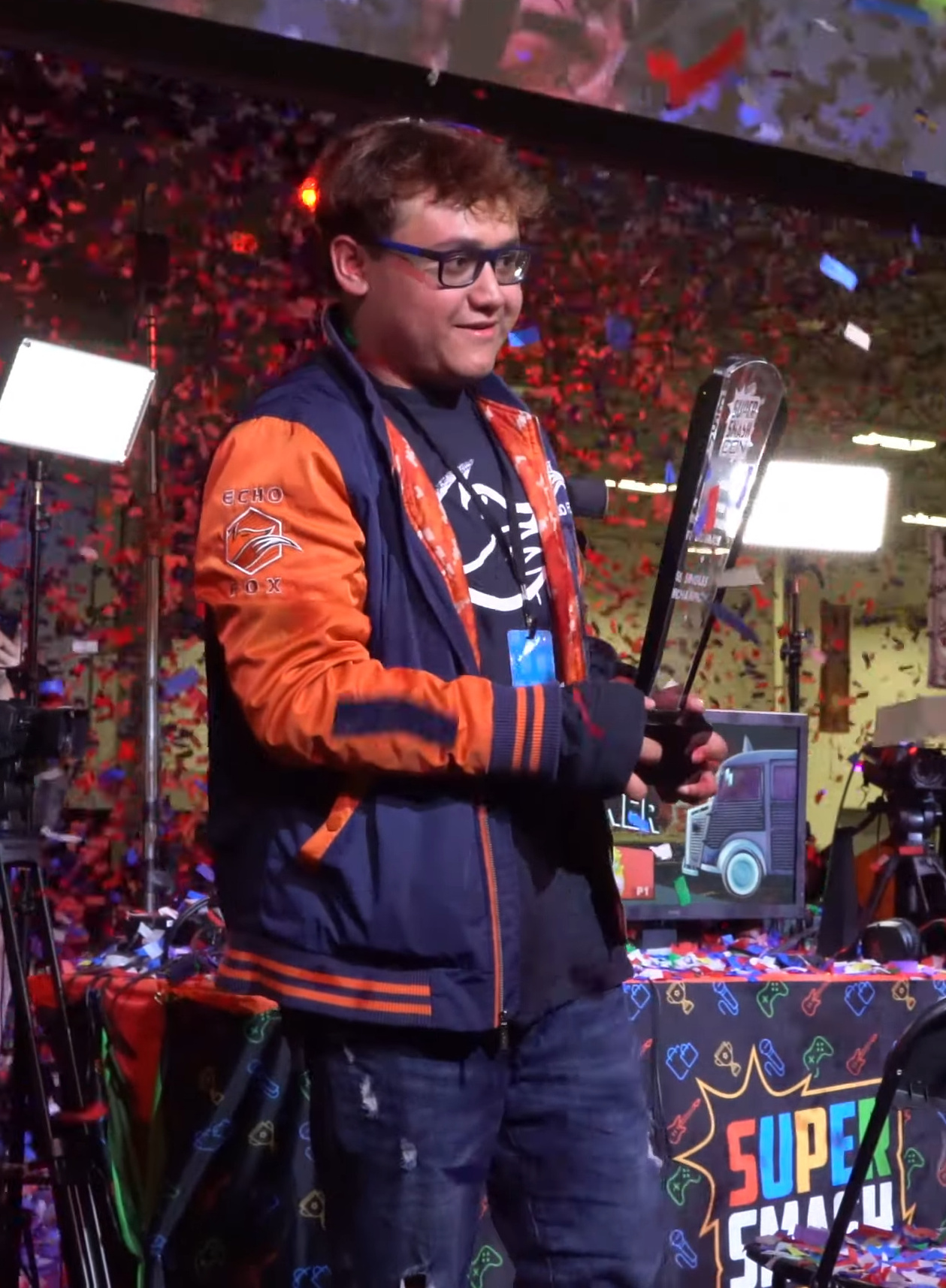
MkLeo won the Super Smash Con 2019 Ultimate singles event.

MkLeo opened the second half of 2019 with a second-place finish at Smash Factor 8, held in Mexico, falling to Tyler "Marss" Martins. Shortly after, MkLeo won Evo 2019, the largest tournament by number of entrants in the Smash Bros. franchise's history (excluding online tournaments). After losing in the round of 16 to Takuto "Kameme" Ono, MkLeo defeated a number of other elite players in the losers' bracket and reached the tournament's grand finals, where he defeated Gavin "Tweek" Dempsey twice – first to reset the bracket, and then to win the tournament, and with it a grand prize of over $21,000. In addition to Evo, he won two other premier tournaments – Super Smash Con 2019 and 2GG: Kongo Saga – and placed second at the major tournaments Shine 2019 and Mainstage 2019. His high placings in these events secured him a second term as the best Ultimate player in the world in the bi-annual Panda Global rankings.

In January 2020, MkLeo placed second at Genesis 7, again falling to Marss, who deprived MkLeo of a fourth straight Genesis title. On February 21, just prior to Frostbite 2020, he announced on Twitter that he had departed Echo Fox. The organization had dissolved in late 2019, and MkLeo and fighting game player SonicFox were the last two players on their roster. At Frostbite, after falling to Pedro "Prodigy" Alonso in the round of 96, MkLeo won the next 11 straight sets, defeating the 2nd, 3rd, 4th, 6th, 7th, 9th, 12th, 22nd, and 30th best players in the Panda Global rankings during his run to win the tournament. A few days after the tournament, multi-esport organization T1 announced that they had signed him.

As of the second half of 2019, MkLeo was listed in the Panda Global rankings as using Joker as his main character and Ike, Lucina, and Wolf as secondary characters. At Frostbite 2020, he played part of the grand finals match with Byleth, who had been released as a playable character in Ultimate only weeks earlier.

Due to the COVID-19 pandemic, most of the tournaments scheduled for the first half of 2020 were cancelled or moved online. In May 2020, MkLeo tied for 33rd out of 8,192 participants at the Hungrybox-organized The Box tournament. Despite input delays and lag caused by competing online, he placed Top 8 in online majors and 2nd at Alpharad and MoistCr1tikal's tournament, The Quarantine Series: Major Tournament 1, losing to Carlos "Sonix" Pérez in Grand Finals. He was ranked 11th out of 75 players in Wi-Fi Warrior Rank v5.

In the second half of 2020, MkLeo began to use Byleth as his primary character and produced solid results placing top 8 in online tournaments. He won the major online tournament Ultimate 32, placing first out of 1,277 players. While down two games against Enrique "Maister" Hernandez Solís in Grand Finals, he switched characters to Ike, a difficult matchup for Maister's character. He won the set with three straight wins and won the Grand Finals Reset with another three. Despite being an online tournament, several players compared MkLeo's performance to his runs at EVO 2019 and Super Smash Con 2019. Despite attending fewer tournaments, his great results overall throughout the season allowed MkLeo to rank 6th out of 50 players in Wi-Fi Warrior Rank v6.

In the first half of 2021, MkLeo continued to play in online tournaments and placed well. As offline tournaments slowly returned, MkLeo decided to commit to primarily using Byleth. MkLeo attended his first offline tournament since Frostbite 2020 at the SWT: Central America Ultimate Regional Finals, where he won the event without dropping a set. His next tournament, Smash Ultimate Summit 3, saw him and his longtime rival Tweek in the Grand Finals set. For the first time since Frostbite 2019, Tweek managed to defeat MkLeo 3–0 in two different sets with his new main, leaving MkLeo at 2nd. Two weeks later, they met again in the Winners' Finals at Riptide. Although Tweek was up two games against him, MkLeo won the next three to take the set. He would then defeat Tweek again in the Grand Finals. These placements re-established MkLeo as the best in the world and shifted the general perception of Byleth, who was previously considered a weak character. MkLeo continued to place top 2 at every major event he attended, winning Riptide, Low Tide City 2021, Port Priority 6, and Mainstage 2021. In December 2021, MkLeo became the first World Champion by winning the Smash World Tour 2021 Championships.

MkLeo did not attend any major tournaments for the first few months of 2022. In March, he competed in the Smash Ultimate Summit 4 invitational, where he fell to Japanese player Protobanham in the Losers' Semifinals match. This marked the first time that MkLeo had placed lower than 2nd at an Ultimate major since Get On My Level 2019 in May 2019, a streak of over 35 tournaments. This occurred for a second time at Collision 2022 later that same month, where he was defeated by Tweek in Losers Finals. In April, he made a return to form by winning the Mexican invitational Delfino Maza's RETA 2022 as well as Genesis 8 over French player Glutonny. He used Corrin for the first time at RETA 2022, using it to beat fellow Mexican player Edgar "Sparg0" Valdez, who was by now considered the second best player in the world, in Grand Finals. MkLeo and Glutonny would meet again in the Grand Finals of Pound 2022, although Glutonny would be victorious this time. At August's Super Smash Con 2022, MkLeo fell to Angel "Onin" Mireles 0–3 in the first round of Winners' Top 32, before being eliminated by Glutonny in Losers' Quarterfinals. He appeared for Smash Ultimate Summit 5 in September where he would miss Top 8 for the second time in his Ultimate career, placing 9th after falling to Tweek.

MkLeo was invited to participate in Ludwig Ahgren's Smash invitational in October, winning the Ultimate bracket over Mashita "あcola" Hayato while only losing one game to Prodigy (now known as "Kurama") in the eight best-of-five sets he played. After Nintendo forced the Smash World Tour 2022 Championships to be cancelled, MkLeo dropped out of the Panda Cup Finale in protest and accepted Ahgren's invitation to play at his event, the "Scuffed World Tour", which was to be held on the same weekend as the Panda Cup Finale before it was indefinitely postponed. He placed 5th, losing to Tweek and Shuto "Shuton" Moriya.

In January 2023, MkLeo played in the tournament Lets Make Big Moves 2023, where he placed 4th place losing to Tweek and Carlos "Sonix" Pérez. At the end of January 2023 MkLeo participated in his next tournament Genesis 9. At Genesis MkLeo in the winners final was knocked down to the losers bracket by Antony "MuteAce" Hoo. After beating Paris "Light" Ramirez Garcia in losers finals, MkLeo took 1st place after beating MuteAce in Grand Finals and the Grand Finals Reset. In February 2023, MkLeo left T1, and a month later, he signed with Luminosity Gaming. At the end of 2023, MkLeo was ranked 11th on the LumiRank Top 100, his lowest ranking since the release of Ultimate.

== Personal life ==
MkLeo has offered paid personal 1-on-1 coaching through the platform Metafy since 2020. He used money from this platform to help his family get through the COVID-19 pandemic when revenue from in-person tournaments began to be scarce.

On October 12, 2022, MkLeo revealed via Twitter that he had been experiencing lifelong ear-related health problems, but it had worsened to the point that it began to affect his hearing and ability to travel. He subsequently dropped out of the upcoming Canadian tournament Battle of Z and took a break from competing that November, intending to prepare for the Smash World Tour 2022 Championships.
