= Plup =

American professional esports player

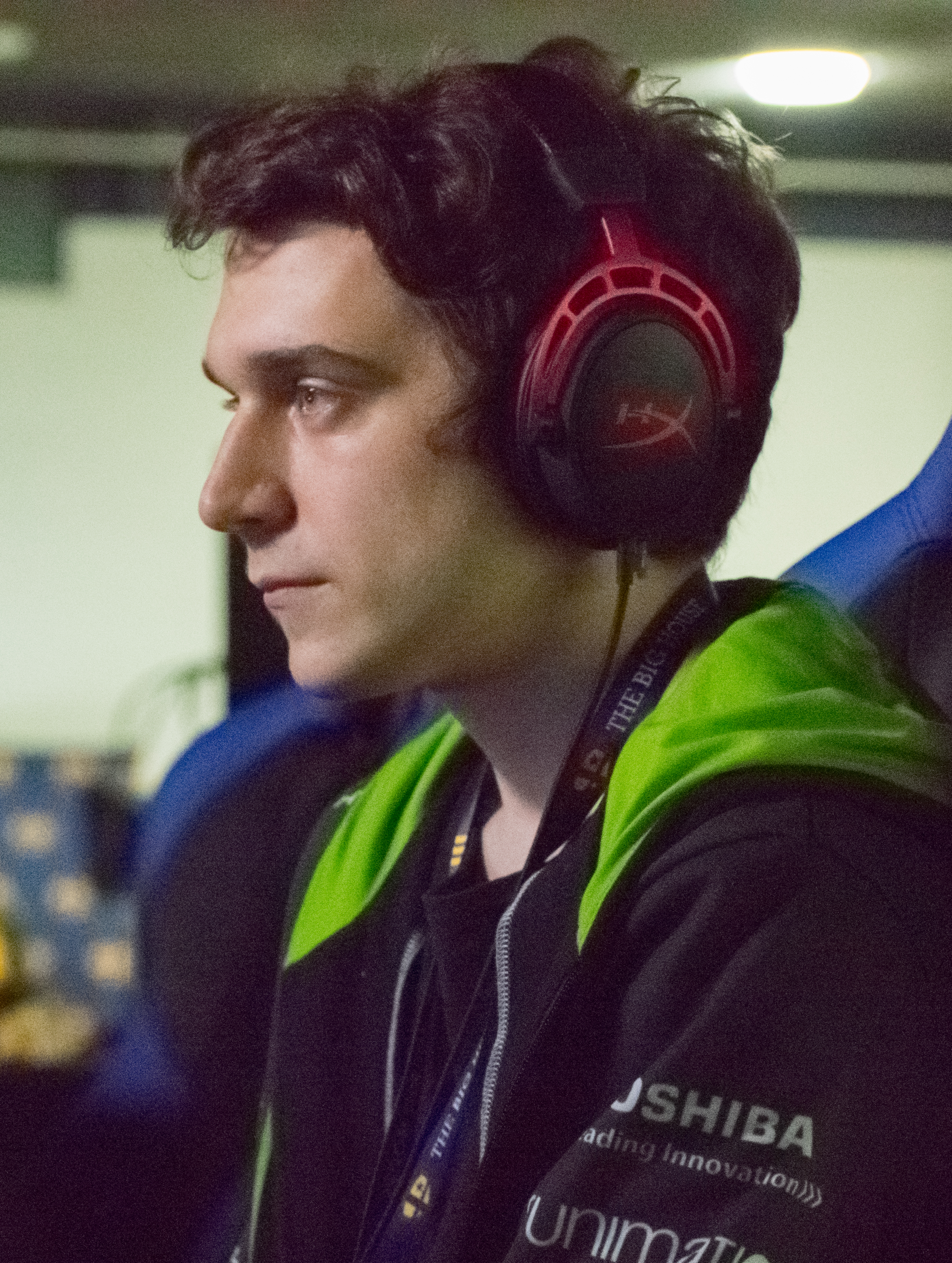
- McGrath at The Big House 7 in 2017

Personal information
- Name: Justin McGrath
- Born: November 24, 1993 (age 32)
- Nationality: American

Career information
- Games: Super Smash Bros. Melee; Project M; Super Smash Bros. Wii U; Super Smash Bros. Ultimate; Rivals of Aether II
- Playing career: 2010–present

Team history
- 2015–2022: Panda Global
- 2018–present: Red Bull

Career highlights and awards
- Super Smash Bros. Melee (4 majors won): DreamHack champion (2017); GENESIS champion (2018); Smash World Tour champion (2021); Riptide champion (2023); Rivals of Aether II: Genesis champion (2025); 2× EVO champion (2025, 2026)

Twitch information
- Channel: plup
- Followers: 105,000
- Last updated: January 2025

Justin McGrath, better known as Plup, is an American professional Super Smash Bros. player from Orlando, Florida. McGrath is considered to be one of the best Super Smash Bros. Melee players in the world, having been ranked as one of the top 10 Melee players from 2015 to 2023.

McGrath initially rose to prominence in 2015 after placing highly in several major tournaments. Among his best placings are first at GENESIS 5, second at The Big House 7 and Smash Summit 9, and third at EVO 2016 and EVO 2018. McGrath was initially the best Samus player in the world but later switched to primarily playing Sheik. In addition to playing Samus and Sheik, McGrath uses Fox as a secondary. McGrath has also competed professionally in Super Smash Bros. Ultimate, playing primarily with Mega Man and Ridley, and Project M playing primarily with Samus. McGrath was formerly sponsored by Panda Global. A 2021 list compiled by PGstats ranked McGrath as the tenth-greatest Melee player of all time.

== Early life ==
When McGrath was seven years old, he received a Super NES from his father.

== Career ==
McGrath began his Super Smash Bros. career in 2010. He entered the CEO 2010 tournament as a Samus player and finished in 13th place out of a total of 62 players. In 2014, he finished in 13th place out of over 600 players at Apex 2014. In 2016, McGrath finished in third place at CEO 2016 Prologue, CEO 2016, and EVO 2016. After finishing in the top 10 at Shine 2016 and Summit 3, he was ranked as the sixth-best placer of the season. In 2017, McGrath won his first major at DreamHack Atlanta 2017 after defeating Hungrybox in the finals and placed second at Big House 7. In 2019, he finished in second at Smash Summit 9.
