= Talking Flower =

Super Mario character

- Mario race
- Depiction of a Talking Flower from Super Mario Bros. Wonder
- First appearance: Super Mario Bros. Wonder (2023)
- Created by: Takashi Tezuka

In-universe information
- Home world: Flower Kingdom

Talking Flowers, known in Japan as Chatty Flowers (Japanese: おしゃべりフラワー, Hepburn: Oshaberi Furawā), are a species in the Mario franchise. They resemble yellow flowers with large mouths and leaves that can act as wings. They originally appeared in the 2023 video game Super Mario Bros. Wonder as non-playable characters throughout the game's levels.

Created by the game's producer, Takashi Tezuka, the Flowers' behavior originated from a scrapped live commentary feature that would react to gameplay. Instead, the commentary attributes were given to a new character that would appear throughout multiple levels in the world of Super Mario Bros. Wonder, which became the Talking Flower. They have since gone on to appear in other Mario game installments such as Super Mario Party Jamboree – Nintendo Switch 2 Edition + Jamboree TV (2025) and Mario Tennis Fever (2026), as well as in various forms of merchandise. Voice actors Mick Wingert and Patrick Seitz have provided the voice for Talking Flowers in English.

In Super Mario Bros. Wonder, Talking Flowers received a mixed response from critics. Some viewed their sassy personality, vocal performance, and dialogue as positive attributes, while others considered their inclusion to be annoying, describing the Flowers as a poor addition to the Mario universe. In Mario Tennis Fever, reception toward Talking Flowers was more negative, while the standalone Talking Flower toy was received more favorably. The species was also subject to controversy, speaking profanity in console modifications of their debut game prior to its release.

== Concept and creation ==
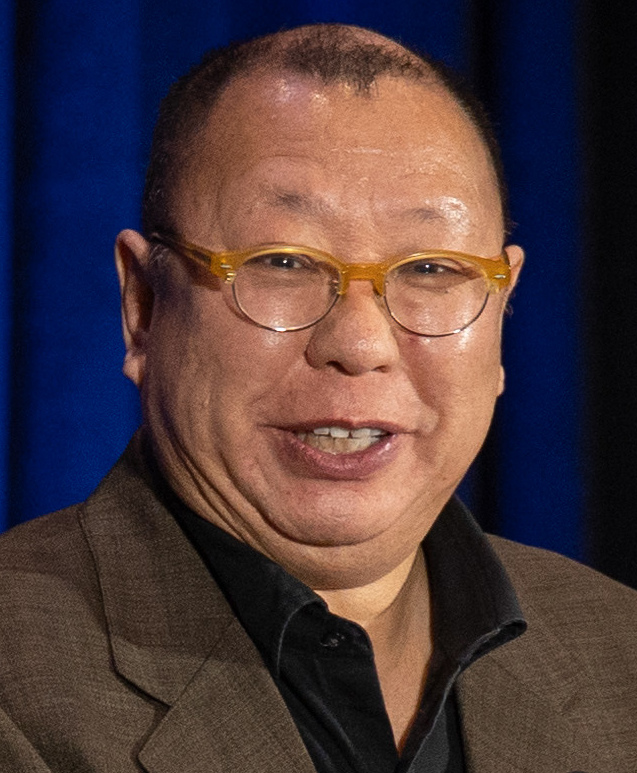
Tezuka in 2024

Talking Flowers are a talkative species of flower that first appear in the 2D platform game Super Mario Bros. Wonder (2023) for the Nintendo Switch. The Flowers are native to the Flower Kingdom, and bloom throughout multiple levels in the kingdom. Its yellow body and mouth forms the shape of a gramophone or a sousaphone. While many of the Flowers are grounded and stationary, they have the ability to fly or hover mid-air by using their green leaves as wings.

When creating Super Mario Bros. Wonder, the production team initially planned to incorporate a "live commentary" feature that would have reacted to the player's actions in-game, and they worked on its development for six months. Ultimately, this feature proved to be too complex and did not quite resonate with those who worked on it. Two selectable voices were planned to give commentary during gameplay, with one described as a generic voice to start with, and an option based on the "tsundere" personality type. Instead, the live commentary was adapted into a character that could appear in multiple stages, resulting in the Talking Flowers being implemented. The game's director, Shiro Mouri, believed that the lines spoken by Talking Flowers were more believable for the Mario universe as opposed to the idea of disembodied live commentary. Their presence also allowed for experimentation in the level design, allowing players to search for hidden Flowers by having them speak. According to Super Mario Bros. Wonder's producer Takashi Tezuka, the Flowers were designed to praise and motivate players in order to stop them from becoming demotivated as they played. The development team had to brainstorm what players would be feeling in order to create lines for the Flowers that players would relate to, which they found to be difficult. Voice lines were also recorded before the level designs were completed, which proved to be an additional challenge, as they had to predict what the layout of the level might look like. In the end, almost every voice line recorded was used in the final release of the game, since Tezuka believed "it would be a waste not to use [them]". The game's sound director Koji Kondo stated that the Talking Flowers were an example of how the development team used sound more than they had in prior entries.

== Appearances ==
Talking Flowers debut in the 2023 video game Super Mario Bros. Wonder as non-playable characters. The Flowers comment on events occurring within the game, often by making jokes. Some flowers also give hints about nearby secrets hidden in the level. Sometimes when approached by the player, a Talking Flower will provide unrelated one-liners, such as wondering what a Goomba tastes like. When the player character touches a Wonder Flower, a power-up that dramatically changes the level by activating a Wonder Effect, Talking Flowers will react in a way that represents what the player's emotions would be. The player can help Talking Flowers by sprinkling them with water when the player is under the Elephant transformation. Upon finding certain thirsty Talking Flowers, they reveal that they are sprouted randomly throughout the Flower Kingdom, as some complain about the locations they currently reside in. Orange Talking Flowers appear during normal levels, whereas red Talking Flowers appear in Badge Challenge levels to inspire the player to complete them.

To commemorate the release of Princess Peach: Showtime! on March 22, 2024, collectible "spirits" from the game and from Super Mario Bros. Wonder were added to Super Smash Bros. Ultimate (2018), including one for the Talking Flower and Wonder Flower. Talking Flowers returned in the party spin-off title Super Mario Party Jamboree – Nintendo Switch 2 Edition + Jamboree TV, an expansion for the Nintendo Switch 2 system. In a new game mode, Bowser Live, a minigame titled "Talking Flower Says" hosted by the Talking Flower uses the camera in a manner similar to Simon Says. Another new mode, Carnival Coaster, features Talking Flowers during a roller coaster ride. In the sports video game Mario Tennis Fever (2026), a Talking Flower provides live sports commentary during tennis matches. Their commentary is turned on by default, and can be turned off for other game modes, but remains turned on in the Adventure mode and during tournaments. Additionally, Talking Flowers return along with new features in Super Mario Bros. Wonder – Nintendo Switch 2 Edition + Meetup in Bellabel Park. One of the new competitive multiplayer modes, "Run, Hide! Phanto Tag", allows a team of hiders to disguise themselves among non-player Talking Flowers while the seekers try to find the real players.

In Super Mario Bros. Wonder, the Flowers are capable of being toggled to only display text, only display voice, or turned off entirely. They can also be toggled to speak in various languages. The ability to toggle the Flower's voice being on or off returned in future titles they appeared in. The Flowers are the only characters in the game to feature full voice acting, with the Flowers being voiced by actor Mick Wingert in English. In Super Mario Bros. Wonder, multiple languages are offered for the Talking Flower, with thirteen voice actors portraying the Talking Flower in different languages. Patrick Seitz, one of the game's voice directors, would succeed Mick Wingert's role as the Talking Flower in English starting with Super Mario Party Jamboree – Nintendo Switch 2 Edition + Jamboree TV. Additionally, Seitz would replace Wingert's lines recorded for the Talking Flower upon the release of Super Mario Bros. Wonder – Nintendo Switch 2 Edition + Meetup in Bellabel Park.

== Promotion and merchandise ==
When purchasing Super Mario Bros. Wonder on the My Nintendo Store, bundles contained a Talking Flower resign figure, as well as a pin set featuring an image of the character. In November 2024, Japanese manufacturing company San-Ei Boeki released a Talking Flower plush toy. The toy is able to speak one of eighteen catchphrases when squeezed, being voiced in both English and Japanese. An Amiibo figurine featuring a Talking Flower and Captain Toad released on March 26, 2026 to commemorate the launch of Super Mario Bros. Wonder – Nintendo Switch 2 Edition + Meetup in Bellabel Park.

In a September 2025 Nintendo Direct, Senior Executive Officer Yoshiaki Koizumi announced that the Talking Flower would receive its own physical product in spring of 2026. Sharing some functionality with Nintendo's digital alarm clock Alarmo, the product can be used as an alarm clock that speaks the current time of day and gives set reminders at night to go to bed. However, the Talking Flower will occasionally say the wrong time and correct itself, or will talk in a different language. On its own, the Talking Flower will automatically say random phrases a few times every hour. A button on the toy can be pressed to make it speak on command, and can be held to silence it for a while, but will remain quiet at night. The toy is powered by batteries and includes a sensor to detect the room temperature, making comments based on both inputs. In addition to the Talking Flower's voice lines, it is capable of playing music from Super Mario Bros. Wonder upon activating "Wonder Mode". It supported eleven different languages at launch and released on March 12, 2026.

== Reception ==
In their debut game Super Mario Bros. Wonder, some critics praised their inclusion, complimenting the dialogue and vocal performances. Nintendo Life author Ollie Reynolds initially expressed skepticism over the inclusion of voice acting in a 2D Mario game, but later developed a fondness for the Talking Flowers, and noted that fan reactions to the character were mostly positive. Dan Conlin writing for TheGamer complimented the vocal performance of Mick Wingert. He claimed the addition of Talking Flowers adds character to the world of Mario, calling those who turn off the Flower's voice "allergic to pure joy". He also stated that Super Mario Bros. Wonder is the best Mario video game with voice acting, as he found the voice of the Talking Flower to be charming. Asif Khan writing for Shacknews believed they were an excellent addition and a highlight of voice acting in the game. He cited their constant encouragement and wisecracking personalities as strengths, summarizing them as "sassy, funny, and adorable". Hiko writing for Game*Spark considered their addition to be positive, claiming the characters left the strongest impression on them. He found some aspects of the character to be scary, such as how they appear in dangerous sections of levels despite being unable to move. Hiko also believed the Talking Flowers were a major contributor to the humorous tone and surreal nature of the game. Chihiro Yuki writing for Real Sound Tech stated the Talking Flowers enhanced the fun factor provided by the Wonder Flowers. When the level design dramatically changes after collecting a Wonder Flower, Yuki explained that the reactions from the Talking Flower helped to transition the player's emotions, believing the developers did an exceptional job at "skillfully guiding the psychology" of the player.

Other critics and gaming journalists have critiqued the voice and dialogue from the Talking Flowers, praising the option to mute their voices. Zoey Handley writing for Destructoid described the Flowers as a small yet significant aggravation, with their phrases cementing "a very painful spot in [her] mind". Handley illustrates their voices as "sharply saccharine" and punchable, viewing their contribution of pointing out hints to the player as unnecessary. She also claimed their voices sounded more irritating in Japanese than in English, ultimately questioning their purpose in the game. Kotaku's Isaiah Colbert considered the Talking Flowers to be a cute new character, highlighting their utility in single-player playthroughs to make the player feel less lonely. However, Colbert believed some people would consider them annoying due to their frequent chatter. He also thought the Flower's voice may wear thin after some time, making the ability to silence them useful for successive playthroughs. George Foster writing for TheGamer considered their dialogue to be "a little much", sticking out like a sore thumb in the Mario series, which has otherwise featured minimal dialogue. TheGamer writer Jade King expressed similar sentiments. She described the voice as a regular human sounding "obnoxiously sweet", with their inclusion being viewed as stranger than the psychedelic effects of the Wonder Flower. King also expressed concerns of being taken out of the world by the dialogue.

Prior to the release of Super Mario Bros. Wonder, the game leaked online, allowing users to share content by emulating the Nintendo Switch system on PC. On emulators, a mod for the game was released, changing the dialogue of the Talking Flowers to use profane language instead. Videos of the usually inoffensive Talking Flowers shouting curse words circulated on social media platforms, causing Nintendo to take down the content by enacting copyright claims.

Giovanni Colantonio writing for Polygon expressed hatred for the continued support for the Talking Flower and their incorporation into the Mushroom Kingdom, the primary setting of the Mario series. In Super Mario Bros. Wonder, Colantonio condemned them for "interrupting the lovely score to drop in cornball one-liners". He has described their future appearances as a plague, positioning itself to become a recurring element in the overall series like the Toad species. In a comparison to the Despicable Me franchise, he describes the Talking Flowers as Mario’s equivalent of the Minions. Colantonio expresses his disdain for their one-liners, similar to characters from other video games such as Forspoken (2023) and Borderlands 4 (2025), ultimately describing the Flowers as a misstep that steers away from Nintendo's great use of "animation-driven physical comedy". Jim Norman, writing for Nintendo Life, reflected on the character two and a half years after their inclusion, describing their rise to fame as sudden and scary. Despite feeling neutral towards the character when it first appeared, Norman recognized that the amount of merchandise and video game appearances was more during 2026 than some characters from Nintendo's largest franchises, including "Link, Samus, Tom Nook and Captain Olimar combined". He also claimed the immortalization of the character as an Amiibo figure, which was set to be bundled with a figure of Captain Toad, was injustice to the character of Captain Toad.

The Flower's inclusion in Mario Tennis Fever garnered a generally unfavorable response from critics. Jenni Lada of Siliconera thought their constant commentary and directions were abhorrent, with the voice becoming obnoxious due to how frequently they speak, particularly during tournaments. Logan Plant of IGN thought their nonstop commentary was too repetitive and quickly became grating, believing that neither kids nor adults would enjoy it. Stacy Henley writing for TheGamer loathed the dialogue itself, claiming the Talking Flower's zingers on regular tennis plays were both stupid and lacked sense.

The Talking Flower product has been received favorably. Bill Lavoy of Shacknews called it the most exciting reveal of the September 2025 Nintendo Direct. Kyle Barr writing for Gizmodo described the product as a simple concept that was not nearly as annoying as other toys with implemented AI usage. In his review for the product, Barr thought the annoying aspects were both good and bad, comparing it to a "big, dumb cat" he was ultimately thankful to have. Justin Kahn writing for 9to5Toys called it "[o]ne of the more unique and novel releases" commemorating the 40th anniversary of the Super Mario series. He claimed the product contained multiple fun features, even if some felt like gimmicks, stating it was worth the price for the adorable figure of the Talking Flower alone. Rosalie Newcombe of GamesRadar+ described it as wonderfully weird with a high-quality build, claiming "it didn't talk as often as [they] feared".
