= Gurman =

Gurman is a surname and unisex (though more often masculine) given name. The surname is of eastern Ashkenazic origin, possibly meaning 'gourmet', while the given name is unrelated and of Indian origin, and means 'heart of the guru'. Notable people with the name include:

== Surname ==
- Aleksey Gurman (born 1978), Kazakhstani diver
- Jamie Gillis (born Jamey Gurman; 1943–2010), American pornographic actor and director
- Mark Gurman (disambiguation), multiple people
- Nafiz Gürman (1882–1966), Turkish general and military officer
- Öykü Gürman (born 1982), Turkish singer and actress

== Given name ==
- Gurman Randhawa (born 1992), English cricketer
