= Patrick Seitz =

American voice actor (born 1978)

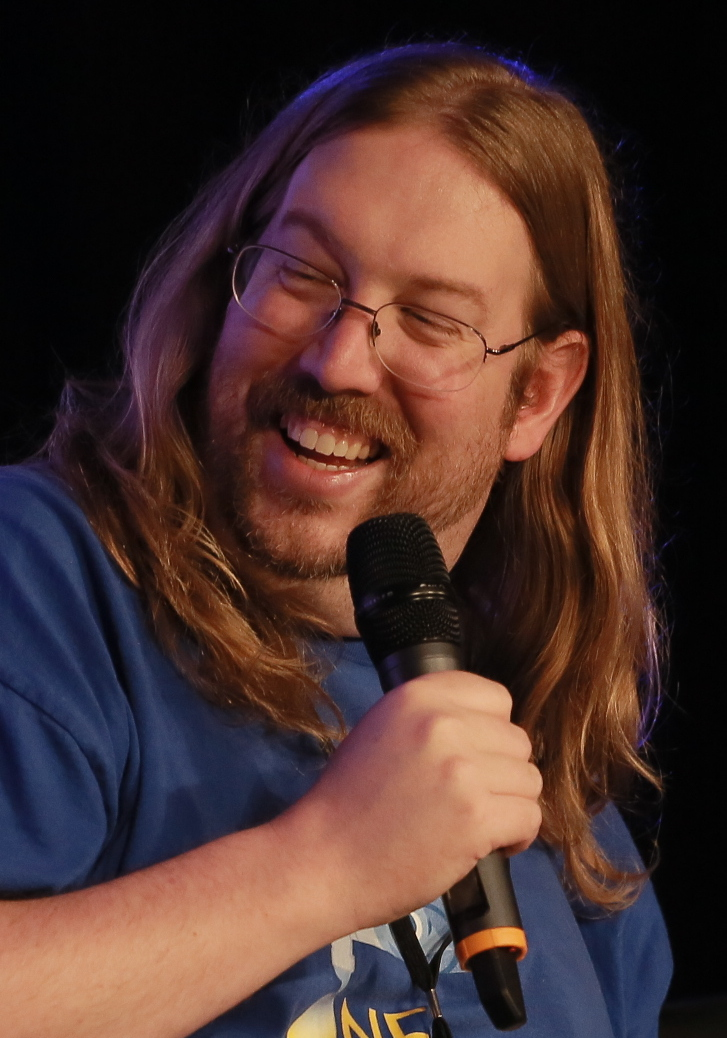
- Seitz in 2015
- Born: David Patrick Seitz; March 17, 1978 (age 48); Riverside, California, U.S.
- Occupations: Voice actor; ADR director; ADR script writer
- Years active: 2000–present
- Website: www.patrickseitz.com

David Patrick Seitz (born March 17, 1978) is an American voice actor, ADR director and script writer best known for portraying Dio Brando in JoJo's Bizarre Adventure. He is also well known for his role as Enji Todoroki/Endeavor in the superhero action anime series My Hero Academia. He has provided voices for English versions of Japanese anime and video games, including over 100 projects since his initial foray into the voice-over industry in 2000 with the Amazing Nurse Nanako OVA.

== Biography ==
Seitz began acting in plays at the age of fourteen when he performed in The King and I. He continued perform in theater throughout high school and took acting and singing lessons. Prior to his current level of involvement in the voice-over industry, he taught English studies at his high school alma mater and received a Bachelor of Arts in Creative Writing, Master of Fine Arts in Creative and the Performing Arts Writing (both from UC Riverside)

== Career ==
Seitz's video game roles include Eternal Sonata, Mortal Kombat, Castlevania, BlazBlue, League of Legends, Xenoblade Chronicles X, Octopath Traveler, Fire Emblem Three Houses, Skullgirls, Tekken, and Ys. Apart from acting, Seitz has adapted and directed the English dubs of JoJo's Bizarre Adventure, Girls Bravo, Kamichu!, Tales of Phantasia OVA and Carole & Tuesday. He also adapted over 100 episodes of other series, including Aggretsuko, Zegapain, Hell Girl, and Romeo x Juliet.

== Filmography ==
=== Anime ===
List of English dubbing performances in anime
Year	Title	Role	Notes	Source
2000	Amazing Nurse Nanako	Saint		
2000	Boys Be...	Yoshihiko Kenjo		
2003	Saiyuki Reload Gunlock	Hazel Grouse		
2003	Rumiko Takahashi Anthology	Mr. Haga	Also ADR Script Writer	
2003	Hellsing	Luke Valentine		
2004	Texhnolyze	Keigo Onishi		
2004–05	R.O.D the TV	Lee Linho		
2005	Koi Kaze	Koshiro Saeki		
2005	Melody of Oblivion	Kurofune Ballad	Also ADR Script Writer	
2005	Tales of Phantasia: The Animation	Dhaos		
2005	Kamichu!	Shark, Benshi, Cat A, Dave, English Teacher, Goblin F, Newscaster, TV Host, Teacher A	Also ADR Script Writer	
2005	DearS	Xaki		
2006–07	Eureka Seven	Charles Beams		
2006–14	Bleach	Kenpachi Zaraki, Isshin Kurosaki, others		
2006–08	Naruto	Tokuma Hyūga, Raido Namiashi, Shisou	Also ADR Script Writer	
2006	Ergo Proxy	Raul Creed		
2006	Fate/stay night	Soichiro Kuzuki		
2007	Hellsing Ultimate	Luke Valentine		
2007–present	One Piece	Franky, Kuroobi, Roshio, Rivers, Additional Voices	Funimation dub	
2007	Mushishi	Seijiro	Ep. 19	
2007	Zegapain	Shima	Also ADR Script Writer	
2008	Buso Renkin	Mamoru "Captain Bravo" Sakimori		
2008	Blue Dragon	Homeron the Second, Innkeeper	Also ADR Script Writer	
2008	Ouran High School Host Club	Umehito Nekozawa		
2009	Honey and Clover	Kaoru Morita	Also ADR Script Writer	
2009	Monster	Wolfgang Grimmer		
2010	Kekkaishi	Narrator, Masamori Sumimura, Uhosuke, Young Shigemori Sumimura		
2010	Girls Bravo	Hayate	Also ADR Script Writer	
2010–21	Hetalia series	Germany		
2010	Hell Girl		Also ADR Script Writer	
2011	Fullmetal Alchemist: Brotherhood	Sloth		
2011–19	Fairy Tail	Laxus Dreyar		
2011	Deadman Wonderland	Kiyomasa Senji		
2011	Durarara!!	Simon Brezhnev		
2011	A Certain Magical Index II	Komaba Ritoku	Ep. 23-24	
2011–17	Naruto: Shippuden	Teuchi, Raido Namiashi, Kitsuchi, Han (Five Tails Jinchūriki), others		
2012	Shakugan no Shana	Annaberg	Season 2	
2012–13	Paradise Kiss	Joji "George" Koizumi		
2012	Steins;Gate	John Titor	Also ADR Script Writer	
2012–13	Tiger & Bunny	Keith Goodman / Sky High		
2013	K	Reisi Munakata		
2013–15	Digimon Fusion	Starmon, MailBirdramon, Blastmon, others		
2013	Fate/Zero	Assassin		
2013–20	Sword Art Online	Agil		
2014	Ben-To	Kenji Dando		
2014	Magi: The Labyrinth of Magic	Ugo, Drakon, Fatima		
2014	Daimidaler the Sound Robot	Penguin Emperor		
2014	The Seven Deadly Sins	Griamore		
2014–22	Attack on Titan series	Keith		
2014–15	Kill la Kill	Ira Gamagoori	Also OVA	
2014	Blood Lad	Franken		
2014–15	Sailor Moon	Kunzite	Viz dub	
2015–16	Durarara!!×2	Simon Brezhnev	Also directed Shō with Kirk Thornton	
2015	BlazBlue Alter Memory	Ragna the Bloodedge	Also ADR Director	
2015	Aldnoah.Zero	Vlad		
2015–18, 21–22	JoJo's Bizarre Adventure	Dio Brando, Star Platinum	Phantom Blood, Stardust Crusaders, Stone Ocean	
2015	Sailor Moon Crystal	Kunzite		
2015	Glitter Force	Buffoons, Chloe's Grandfather		
2016–25	My Hero Academia	Enji Todoroki / Endeavor		
2016	Konosuba	Verdia		
2016	Your Lie in April	Yoshiyuki Miyazono	Also ADR Director	
2016–present	Bungo Stray Dogs	Kunikida Doppo		
2016	Mob Psycho 100	Musashi Goda		
2016	The Asterisk War	Lester MacPhail		
2016–17	God Eater	Johannes von Schicksal		
2016	Sengoku Basara: End of Judgement	Motochika Chōsokabe		
2017	Hunter × Hunter	Uvogin	2011 series	
2017	Glitter Force Doki Doki	King Mercenare, Mr. Kittredge		
2017	Anohana: The Flower We Saw That Day	Game Shop Manager	2011 series	
2018	Terraformars	Sylvester Asimov		
2018	B: the Beginning	Mario		
2018	Aggretsuko	Additional voices	Also ADR Director	
2018	SwordGai: The Animation	Takuma Miura, Mystery Face C		
2019	Dragon Ball Super	Jiren		
2019	Radiant	Konrad de Marbourg		
2019	Teasing Master Takagi-san	Mr. Tanabe	Season 2	
2019	Carole & Tuesday	Desmond		
2019	Fire Force	Haran		
2020	Marvel Future Avengers	Thor, Klaw, Aegis, General Brushoff		
2020	Ghost in the Shell: SAC_2045	Gary's Subordinate		
2021	Kemono Jihen	Kohachi Inugami		
2021	Black Clover	Dante Zogratis		
2021	Beastars	Riz	Season 2	
2021–23	Vinland Saga	Thorkell	Netflix dub	
2021	Kuroko's Basketball	Eiji Shirogane		
2021	Sonny Boy	Cap		
2021	Hortensia Saga	Rugis F. Camellia		
2021	My Senpai Is Annoying	Takeda		
2022	Odd Taxi	Dobu		
2022–present	Bleach: Thousand-Year Blood War	Kenpachi Zaraki, Isshin Kurosaki		
2023	Gamera Rebirth	Raymond Osborn	Netflix dub	
2023	Pluto	North No. 2	Also Dubbing Director and Adapter	
2024	Solo Leveling	Kim Chul		
2024	Ishura	Narrator		
2024	Fairy Tail: 100 Years Quest	Laxus Dreyar		
2024	That Time I Got Reincarnated as a Slime	Jinrai	Season 3	
2025	Zenshu	Soldier		
2025	Tougen Anki	Samidare Momoya		
2025	Tojima Wants to Be a Kamen Rider	Tojima		
2026	Rooster Fighter	Keiji		
2026	Pokémon Horizons: The Series Season 3 - Rising Hope	Master Mayonnaise		
2026	Star Wars: Visions Presents – The Ninth Jedi	Homen		

=== Animation ===
List of voice performances in animation
Year	Title	Role	Notes	Source
2016	Justice League Action	Jason Blood / Etrigan the Demon, Merlin	Eps. "Speed Demon"; "Hat Trick"	
2016	Transformers: Combiner Wars	Devastator		
2017	Transformers: Titans Return	Overlord		
2018	Transformers: Power of the Primes	Overlord		
2020	ThunderCats Roar	Tygra, Mumm-Ra		
2020–2024	Lego Monkie Kid	Sandy, Strong Spider, Sha Wujing		

=== Films ===
List of voice and English dubbing performances in direct-to-video and television films
Year	Title	Role	Notes	Source
2009	Redline	JP		
2010	Lego Atlantis: The Movie	First Mate Lance Spears		
2011	Tekken: Blood Vengeance	Jin Kazama	Credited as Darren Daniels	
2012	Oblivion Island: Haruka and the Magic Mirror	Baron		
2012	A Turtle's Tale 2: Sammy's Escape from Paradise	Toots, Bodyguard		
2012	Fullmetal Alchemist: The Sacred Star of Milos	Ashley Crichton, Lt. Colonel Herschel		
2012	King of Thorn	Marco Owen		
2012	Resident Evil: Damnation	Scarecrow		
2013	One Piece Film: Strong World	Franky		
2014	Patema Inverted	Jaku		
2014	One Piece Film: Z	Franky		
2015	009 Re:Cyborg	005/Geronimo Jr.		
2015	The Laws of the Universe Part 0	Takamine	Limited theatrical release	
2020	Mortal Kombat Legends: Scorpion's Revenge	Scorpion		
2021	Batman: Soul of the Dragon	King Snake		
2021	Mortal Kombat Legends: Battle of the Realms	Scorpion		
2022	Mortal Kombat Legends: Snow Blind	Scorpion		
2023	Mazinkaiser vs the Great General of Darkness	Dr. Morimori		

List of voice and English dubbing performances in feature films
Year	Title	Role	Notes	Source
2011	Summer Wars	Kunihiko Jinnochi		
2012	Mass Effect: Paragon Lost	Captain David Anderson		
2013	The Tower	Lee Dae-ho		
2015	Inside Out	Train of Thought Conductor and Pizza Delivery Bear		
2015	Riley's First Date?	Dad's Joy, Alarm	Short film	
2017	One Piece Film: Gold	Franky		
2017	Sword Art Online The Movie: Ordinal Scale	Agil		
2019	One Piece: Stampede	Franky		
2020	NiNoKuni	Barton Rosch		
2021	Sword Art Online Progressive: Aria of a Starless Night	Agil		
2022	One Piece Film: Red	Franky		
2023	The First Slam Dunk	Norio Hotta		

=== Video games ===
List of voice and English dubbing performances in video games
Year	Title	Role	Notes	Source
2004–present	World of Warcraft series	Garrosh Hellscream, Arthas Menethil		
2006	Tales of Phantasia		Also ADR script writer	
2006	Ace Combat Zero: The Belkan War	Additional voices		
2006	Valkyrie Profile 2: Silmeria	Dylan, Brahms		
2007	Eternal Sonata	Frédéric François Chopin		
2007–11	Castlevania series	Dracula		
2007	Resident Evil: The Umbrella Chronicles	Sergei Vladimir		
2007–present	Tekken series	Bob		
2007	Time Crisis 4	Player 2 Announcer		
2008	One Piece: Unlimited Adventure	Franky		
2008	Valkyria Chronicles	Radi Jaeger, Leon Schmidt		
2008	Mortal Kombat vs. DC Universe	Deathstroke, Scorpion, Shao Kahn, Dark Kahn		
2009–present	BlazBlue series	Ragna the Bloodedge		
2009	G.I. Joe: The Rise of Cobra	M.A.R.S. Security Troopers		
2009	Undead Knights	Zombie		
2010	Final Fantasy XIII	Cocoon Inhabitants		
2010	Transformers: War for Cybertron	Silverbolt		
2010–present	StarCraft series	Artanis, Goliath		
2010	Quantum Theory	Jim, Xex, Infected Heavy		
2010	Sengoku Basara: Samurai Heroes	Motochika Chosokabe		
2010–present	Naruto series	Teuchi, Han (Five Tails Jinchūriki), Kitsuchi, Aoda		
2011	League of Legends	Kog'Maw, Renekton, Lucian		
2011	Warhammer 40,000: Dawn of War II – Retribution	Kaptin Bluddflagg, Warmaster Abaddon		
2011	Mortal Kombat	Scorpion		
2011	Resident Evil: The Mercenaries 3D	Tutorial		
2011	Resistance 3	Wardens, Haven Residents		
2011	Rune Factory: Tides of Destiny	Masked Man		
2011	Saints Row: The Third	Assorted 3rd Street Saints		
2012	Soulcalibur V	Cervantes de Leon	Voice-over and facial capture director	
2012	Gotham City Impostors	The Ninja		
2012	Street Fighter X Tekken	Hugo, Bob		
2012	Skullgirls	Samson, Shamone		
2012	Diablo III	Lazarus, Monsters, others	Grouped under Additional Voices and Monster Voice Effects	
2012	Dragon's Dogma	Mason		
2012	Resident Evil 6	Fat Zombie		
2012	Skylanders: Giants	Hot Head		
2013	Fire Emblem Awakening	Basilio and Laurent	The official credits mistakenly labeled Laurent voiced by George C. Cole.	
2013	Sly Cooper: Thieves in Time	Caveman "Bob" Cooper		
2013	Injustice: Gods Among Us	Scorpion		
2013	Killer Is Dead	Mondo Zappa		
2013	Tales of Xillia	Jiao		
2013	Grand Theft Auto V	The Local Population		
2013	Skylanders: Swap Force	Rip Tide, Hot Head	Grouped under Voice Talent	
2013	Killer Instinct	T.J. Combo		
2014	Earth Defense Force 2025	Whale		
2014	Smite	Chaac, Hades, Cerberus, Uncle Sam		
2014	Ultra Street Fighter IV	Hugo		
2014	Danganronpa 2: Goodbye Despair	Nekomaru Nidai		
2014	The Sims 4	Sim		
2014	Super Smash Bros. for Nintendo 3DS and Wii U	Magnus		
2014	Skylanders: Trap Team	Chomp Chest, Rip Tide, Hot Head	Grouped under Voice Actors	
2014	Power Rangers Super Megaforce	Various voices		
2015	Dragon Ball Xenoverse	Time Patroller		
2015	Infinite Crisis	Nix Uotan		
2015	Pillars of Eternity	Kana Rua		
2015	Mortal Kombat X	Scorpion		
2015	Heroes of the Storm	Artanis, Garrosh, Cho		
2015	Batman: Arkham Knight	Militia Brutes		
2015	Lost Dimension	none	Voice director	
2015	Skylanders: SuperChargers	Rip Tide, Hot Head	Grouped under Voice Actors	
2015	Xenoblade Chronicles X	Douglas Barett, Daghan		
2015	The Legend of Heroes: Trails of Cold Steel	Vulcan		
2016	Lego Marvel's Avengers	Butterball, Fin Fang Foom		
2016	Dragon Ball Xenoverse 2	Time Patroller, Jiren	DLC (Jiren)	
2016	Tyranny	Barik		
2016	Final Fantasy XV	Navyth Arlund		
2017	Fire Emblem Heroes	Draug, Hector		
2017	For Honor	Helvar the Male Allied Berserker		
2017	Danganronpa V3: Killing Harmony	Monokid, Tsumugi Shirogane (as Nekomaru Nidai)		
2018	Detective Pikachu	Carlos Hernando		
2018	BlazBlue: Cross Tag Battle	Ragna the Bloodedge		
2018	Soulcalibur VI	Cervantes de Leon		
2018	Octopath Traveler	Olberic Eisenberg		
2019	Dragon Ball FighterZ	Jiren	DLC	
2019	Devil May Cry 5	King Cerberus, Soldier		
2019	Fire Emblem: Three Houses	Jeritza, Lambert, Death Knight	Also voice director	
2019	River City Girls	Abobo		
2019	Daemon X Machina	Reaper		
2020	One-Punch Man: A Hero Nobody Knows	Tank-Top Master		
2020	Granblue Fantasy Versus	Ladiva		
2020	The Legend of Heroes: Trails of Cold Steel IV	Mueller Vander		
2020	Sakuna: Of Rice and Ruin	Tauemon		
2020	Yakuza: Like a Dragon	Yamato Totsuka		
2020	Hyrule Warriors: Age of Calamity	Malanya		
2020	Dragon Ball Legends	Jiren		
2021	Re:Zero − Starting Life in Another World: The Prophecy of the Throne	Kadomon Risch		
2021–22	Genshin Impact	Wang Ping'an, Enjou		
2021	Cookie Run: Kingdom	Dark Cacao Cookie		
2021	Shin Megami Tensei III: Nocturne HD Remaster	Gozu-Tennoh		
2021	Scarlet Nexus	Additional voices	Also voice director	
2021	BloodRayne Betrayal: Fresh Bites	Brimstoner 1		
2021	Shin Megami Tensei V	Metatron		
2022	Dawn of the Monsters	Conrad Fosco		
2022	Phantom Breaker: Omnia	Gaito		
2022	AI: The Somnium Files – Nirvana Initiative	Mama		
2022	Fire Emblem Warriors: Three Hopes	Jeritza, Death Knight	Also voice director and caster	
2022	Soul Hackers 2	Victor		
2022	Them's Fightin' Herds	Texas	DLC	
2022	River City Girls 2	Abobo, Jack, Mibobo, School Chef, Almas Gold		
2023	Fire Emblem Engage	Hector, Additional voices		
2023	Trinity Trigger	Nero		
2023	The Legend of Heroes: Trails into Reverie	Mueller Vander, Soldiers & Citizens of Zemuria		
2023	Armored Core VI: Fires of Rubicon	Handler Walter		
2023	Detective Pikachu Returns	Additional voices		
2023	Disgaea 7: Vows of the Virtueless	Fenrich		
2023	Like a Dragon Gaiden: The Man Who Erased His Name	Additional voices		
2023	Granblue Fantasy Versus: Rising	Ladiva		
2024	Like a Dragon: Infinite Wealth	Yuya, additional voices		
2024	Persona 3 Reload	President Tanaka		
2024	Unicorn Overlord	Giethe, Great Sage of Zenoira		
2024	Solo Leveling: Arise	Kim Chul		
2024	Romancing SaGa 2: Revenge of the Seven	Bear/Heavy Infantry		
2024	Ys X: Nordics	Dogi		
2025	Like a Dragon: Infinite Wealth	Additional voices		
2025	Monster Hunter Wilds	Fabius		
2025	Yakuza 0 Director's Cut	Additional voices		
2025	Raidou Remastered: The Mystery of the Soulless Army	Victor		
2025	Pac-Man World 2 Re-Pac	Toc-Man		
2025	Octopath Traveler 0	Olberic Eisenberg		
2026	Mario Tennis Fever	Talking Flower	Also a voice director	
2026	Yakuza Kiwami 3 & Dark Ties	Florist of Sai, Yuya		
2026	Danganronpa 2×2	Nekomaru Nidai		
2026	Fatal Fury: City of the Wolves	Wolfgang Krauser		
