= Nabbit =

Fictional character from the Super Mario series

- Super Mario character
- Nabbit holding a Super Mushroom, as depicted in Super Mario Bros. Wonder
- First game: New Super Mario Bros. U (2012)
- Voiced by: Natsuko Yokoyama (2012–2023); Dawn M. Bennett (2023–present)

In-universe information
- Species: Rabbit
- Occupation: Thief
- Home: Secret Island (New Super Mario Bros. U)

Nabbit (Japanese: トッテン, Hepburn: Totten) is a character in the Super Mario series, first appearing in Nintendo's 2012 platformer New Super Mario Bros. U for the Wii U. Nabbit, depicted as a purple rabbit-like creature, is a thief who steals items from Toads. Initially depicted as an antagonist for the player to chase down in levels to recover the stolen items, Nabbit was later upgraded to the role of playable character in the 2013 expansion pack New Super Luigi U and has since appeared in other games in the Mario franchise. Unlike other playable characters, he is immune to most forms of damage, often being designated as an "easy mode" character. Nabbit was originally voiced by Natsuko Yokoyama, but was later replaced by Dawn M. Bennett in Super Mario Bros. Wonder.

Due to his immunity to damage, Nabbit had a mixed reception as playable character. Some critics welcomed the character as a good option for beginner players, while others believed the character ruined the difficulty of the gameplay and made him unenjoyable to play as.

== Appearances ==
Nabbit's first appearance is in 2012's New Super Mario Bros. U as an antagonistic thief who steals from Toads. During the game, Nabbit will show up in a level on the world map. Entering the level he appears in, the player is tasked with chasing down and catching Nabbit before he reaches the end of the level. Catching him and giving his stolen bag back to Toad will lead to the player being rewarded by Toad with a P-Acorn, a power-up that allows the player to fly continuously in a level. Later on in the game, the player can access "Secret Island" which logs the actions the player has done throughout the game. The island is hinted as belonging to Nabbit, seemingly revealing that he has been investigating Mario and his friends from the beginning.

Nabbit returned in Mario U's expansion pack New Super Luigi U, being upgraded to the role of playable character in place of Mario. Whilst initially being announced as a multiplayer-exclusive character, he can be played in single-player using hidden button command. However, unlike the other playable characters in the game, he is invulnerable to damage from enemies/obstacles and instead briefly flashes and slightly bumped backwards; only being able to die from environmental hazards such as lava and bottomless pits. To counterbalance this, Nabbit is unable to use power-ups and Baby Yoshis, nor can be picked up by other players. If he picks up power-ups in a level, they are converted to 1-Ups at the end of the level. To further differentiate himself from the other characters, he is able to swim faster underwater and cannot slide on ice. If Nabbit is not selected, he returns to the thief role from Mario U where the player needs to catch him. In 2019's New Super Mario Bros. U Deluxe, an enhanced port featuring both Mario U and Luigi U, Nabbit became playable in the former game's campaign. (Note: In-game, Nabbit is labelled as the "Easiest" playable character.) Nabbit's next playable appearance in the 2D Super Mario series was in 2023's Super Mario Bros. Wonder. Nabbit is grouped in with the Yoshis as the characters cannot take damage or use power-ups; however, unlike the Yoshis, he cannot be knocked back by enemies and has the ability to convert power-ups to the in-game currency "flower coins".

Outside of the 2D Super Mario series, Nabbit has appeared in a number of the Mario spinoff games. He has made playable appearances in Mario Golf: World Tour as DLC in the Flower Pack, in the 100m event in Mario & Sonic at the Rio 2016 Olympic Games, and was added to Dr. Mario World and Mario Kart Tour via updates in 2020. (Note: Mario Kart Tour: Dr. Mario World:) Nabbit would later make his mainline Mario Kart debut as a racer in 2025's Mario Kart World. Nabbit also appears in Mario Tennis Fever, making his debut in the Mario Tennis series. In Super Mario Maker, the player can earn a Nabbit costume for the player to wear. In the Mario & Luigi series, Nabbit first appeared in 2015's Mario & Luigi: Paper Jam. He is involved in various chase segments throughout the game, where catching him grants Mario and Luigi new attack moves to use in battle. In the 2019 remake of Mario & Luigi: Bowser's Inside Story, he is a recruitable ally in the side-mode Bowser Jr.'s Journey. Nabbit has also made cameo appearances in Mario Party 10, Super Mario Party and Mario Golf: Super Rush.

Outside of the Mario games, Nabbit has made appearances in Super Smash Bros. for Nintendo 3DS and Wii U and Ultimate. He appears in the stage "Mushroom Kingdom U" and is able to grab fighters in his bag. In the latter game, he also appears as a collectable "Spirit" which the player can use to aid in matches. In 2022, Nabbit was added in the Series 5 line of character packs in the Lego Super Mario theme, being labelled with an action tag making it compatible with the "Starter Course" set. He was later featured to the "Nabbit at Toad’s Shop" set in 2023, with his bag being able to store an item. This set was later retired at the end of 2024.

== Concept and design ==
Nabbit is a purple rabbit-like creature, with his name being a portmanteau of "nab" and "rabbit". He wears a handkerchief on his face matching the one Bowser Jr. wears, however, there has never been an official connection between the two characters. Nabbit also carries a sack, which typically holds power-ups that he finds. Following a screenshot of The Legend of Zelda: A Link Between Worlds that was posted to Miiverse by Eiji Aonuma, many fans compared the similarities between the character Ravio with Nabbit, believing there was a connection between the two. During a Nintendo Direct in October 2013, the speculation ended after the connection was debunked. In a later interview with Spike, Aonuma explained he was not aware of Nabbit's existence due to being busy and was interested in the response on Miiverse. He had then spoken to Nintendo president Satoru Iwata about including this speculation in the direct.

During an Iwata Asks interview, New Super Luigi U director Masataka Takemoto spoke about why Nabbit was chosen to be the 4th playable character in the game's multi-player mode, believing that he was the only choice after shooting down the idea of a playable third Toad or Princess Peach. Imagining the concept of using him to slip past enemies as fun, he asked a programmer to design a prototype of a playable Nabbit. Whilst initially unenthusiastic to work on the prototype, the programmer was reportedly overjoyed with the final results, and Takemoto presented the prototype to the game's producer Takashi Tezuka. In the interview, Tezuka stated that a playable Nabbit helped solve the problem of having a feature that would help beginners, noting that it lined up with a saying from Shigeru Miyamoto during a discussion with Hobo Nikkan Itoi Shinbun; "An idea is a single solution that solves multiple issues at once." During an interview with Famitsu, Miyamoto would continue this further by stating Nabbit would act similarly to New Super Mario Bros. Wii's "Demo Play" feature, suggesting he was for players who were not good at games and wanted to participate in multiplayer.

When choosing the cast for Super Mario Bros. Wonder, Nabbit was one of the first group of characters added due to being playable in previous games. During an "Ask the Developers", the developers of Wonder noted that Nabbit's implementation as a playable character in the game was done with those who would find the game difficult and newcomers in mind, with the game's director Shiro Mouri hoping newcomers would play as him.

From New Super Mario Bros. U, Nabbit was voiced by Nintendo sound designer Natsuko Yokoyama. In 2023, it was announced that Dawn M. Bennett would be the new voice of Nabbit, first starting in Wonder. Bennett has since returned to voice him in Mario Kart World.

== Critical reception ==
Critics had mixed views on Nabbit in New Super Luigi U. In a review for Nintendo Life, Thomas Whitehead noted that whilst Nabbit's inclusion as an easy mode in a tough game was "admirable", he believed it was misguided due to his inability to be picked up when players are in a hurry, recommending players who are looking for an easier time to just play New Super Mario Bros. U instead. Peter Brown of GameSpot noted that while he may stunt players in co-op by accidentally wasting items from those that needed them, his invulnerability could help other players by dodging enemies to reach a safe space in a level; adding that Nabbit was "a nice change of pace from the likes of Toad and Mario." Writing for Engadget, Jason Venter voiced how he thought Nabbit "stole the thunder" from Luigi, detailing how he can clear the game in a few hours, though Venter noted this would not be ideal for series veterans who would want to find the game's many secrets. Alex Culafi of Nintendo World Report wrote that Nabbit's implementation was great for new players to experience the game without them feeling overwhelmed, though he mentioned that he thought Nabbit's inclusion by re-using him from Mario U instead of using a new character was lazy. Similarly, Destructoid's Chris Carter stated that an issue with Nabbit from a design perspective was someone being forced to play as him during 4-player multiplayer, feeling it could turn away player. Carter suggested characters such as Princess Peach or Toadette should have been implemented over Nabbit. GamesRadar+'s Hollander Cooper wrote about Nabbit's addition in the game dampened and confused the multiplayer, feeling that Nabbit's inability to collect items made him less fun to play. Later expanding Cooper's point, Henry Gilbert opined how Nabbit's inclusion caused problems with the multiplayer, explaining how Nabbit's damage invulnerability could lead confused players into danger such as landing on spikes. Defending Nabbit's inclusion, Nintendo Life shared an article about how Nabbit helped a blind girl beat the game with her family, feeling like playing with him was not "slowing them down or holding them back."

Nabbit continued to be scrutinized following his appearance in Wonder. Writing for Polygon, Ana Diaz stated that she liked Nabbit's characterization as a "pesky little thief" compared to Mario's hero role and believed he was a good addition to the game as way to reach out a wide range of players. However, she added that she felt cheated playing as him due to his inability to interact with enemies and power-ups, noting he did not represent the traditional Mario experience. Ranking the playable characters in Wonder, Jason Faulkner from GameRevolution placed him in the bottom tier for being the least fun to play, describing him as insufferable and "the worst character in the Mario universe." Many fans voiced their frustrations with Nabbit's abilities upon the release of the game, with some describing him and the Yoshis as "forced easy mode". Additionally, fans of the character expressed disappointment in his inability to use the game's new power-ups, wishing instead for the character's "easy mode" abilities to be togglable or to even give the character a "hard mode" option. Conversely, parents praised the easy mode characters, stating that they could use the characters to help guide their children. Countering this point, Ollie Reynolds from Nintendo Life echoed the sentiment that all characters should have difficulty settings instead of singling out specific characters, adding that he believes no child would want to play as Nabbit over characters such as Mario, Luigi, and Princess Peach.

Critics have also commented on Nabbit's other appearances in the Mario franchise. In his review of New Super Mario Bros. U, VentureBeat's Rus McLaughlin praised Nabbit's chase sections, describing it as his favourite side mode of the main campaign. Upon the announcement of Nabbit's playable appearance in Dr. Mario World, James Jones of Nintendo World Report critiqued his inclusion, jokingly questioning if he would "steal your organs". Jones lamented how he considered Nabbit to be a "non-character" and instead "an affliction", insisting that the use of his original render instead of making a new one was evidence of Nintendo's lack of thought for Nabbit. Writing for TheGamer, Eric Switzer similarly wrote how he did not believe Nabbit to be a real character, convinced he was more of a fake character like Graggle Simpson. Switzer further noted that Nabbit did not conform to the Mario franchise's character design philosophy, feeling that his "perfect round eyes with no iris and no reflection" compared to the Mario cast's oval-shaped eyes with reflection made him appear more like a Funko Pop.

== See also ==
- Rabbits in fiction
