= Mick Wingert =

American voice actor (born 1974)

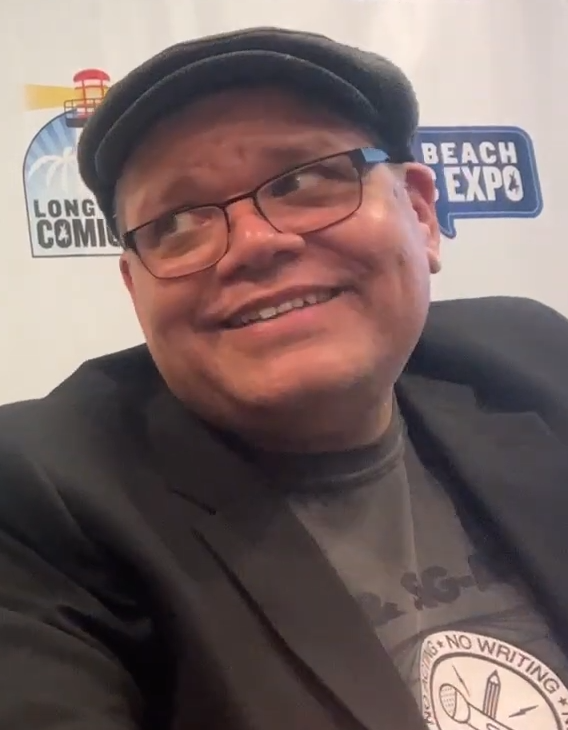
- Wingert at the 2023 Long Beach Comic Con
- Born: July 4, 1974 (age 52); Lemoore, California, U.S.
- Occupation: Voice actor
- Years active: 2000–present
- Website: www.mickwingert.com

Mick Wingert (born July 4, 1974) is an American voice actor. He provided the voices of Master Po and Zeng in Kung Fu Panda: Legends of Awesomeness, taking over the roles from actors Jack Black and Dan Fogler, respectively; as well as Iron Man in various Marvel productions. He was the voice of Heimerdinger in the Netflix series Arcane, and he has done additional voice-over work in Kung Fu Panda, Mass Effect 2, Murdered: Soul Suspect, The Technomancer, Titanfall 2, The Princess and the Frog and The NoSleep Podcast.

== Career ==
Wingert has been working as a voice actor since 2000 and became a transplant to Southern California that same year. He studied theater and mass communication at California State University and began working as a voice actor for local and regional advertising.

Wingert voiced Po in the TV show Kung Fu Panda: Legends of Awesomeness. Wingert has been praised by Kung Fu Panda fans for his accurate impression of Jack Black. He is also the voice of Po in the Kung Fu Panda video games and Kung Fu Panda: The Paws of Destiny.

Wingert worked as a voice actor in The Princess and the Frog as additional voices and The Avengers: Earth's Mightiest Heroes as the A.I. for Beta Ray Bill's ship Skuttlebutt. Wingert was also cast in other video games, like Mass Effect 2 and Super Mario Bros. Wonder as the Talking Flowers.

From 2017 to 2019, Wingert voiced Iron Man / Tony Stark for the Avengers Assemble animated series, replacing Adrian Pasdar. He has since reprised the role in Marvel: Contest of Champions, Lego Marvel Super Heroes: Avengers Reassembled, Marvel Super Hero Adventures: Frost Fight!, Lego Marvel Super Heroes - Black Panther: Trouble in Wakanda, Marvel Future Avengers, Marvel Rising, Guardians of the Galaxy and Spider-Man. He also voices the Marvel Cinematic Universe incarnation of Iron Man in What If...?.

From 2021 to 2024, Wingert voiced the character Heimerdinger in the Netflix series Arcane.

== Personal life ==
Wingert married Shawna Scott Barnhart in 2011; they later divorced. In 2026, he came out as gay on the podcast All the Greatest Gays.

He is not related to voice actor Wally Wingert.

== Filmography ==
=== Film ===
List of voice performances in films
Year	Title	Role	Notes
2009	The Princess and the Frog	Additional voices	
2011	Batman: Year One	Guard	Credited as Bruce Wingert
2014	The Pirate Fairy	Starboard	
2014	Batman: Assault on Arkham	Joker Security Guard	
2015	April and the Extraordinary World	Additional voices	
2015	Bilal: A New Breed of Hero	Safwan	
2015	Marvel Super Hero Adventures: Frost Fight!	Tony Stark / Iron Man, Athidel	
2016	Kung Fu Panda 3	Farmer Goose, Farmer Rabbit	
2017	Tom and Jerry: Willy Wonka and the Chocolate Factory	Mr. Slugworth / Mr. Wilkinson	
2018	Lego Marvel Super Heroes - Black Panther: Trouble in Wakanda	Iron Man	
2018	Goosebumps 2: Haunted Halloween	Slappy the Dummy	
2018	Lucky	Pappy	Television film
2019	One Piece: Stampede	Buena Festa	English dub
2019	Curious George: Royal Monkey	Mayor, Nature Show Narrator, Worker	
2021	Poupelle of Chimney Town	Patch	English dub
2023	Lego Marvel Avengers: Code Red	Iron Man	Disney+ television special
2025	Lego Marvel Avengers: Strange Tails	Iron Man, Omega Red, Stark Computer	Disney+ television special
2026	Batman: Knightfall	Harvey Bullock, Prisoner	Direct-to-video

=== Anime ===
List of voice performances in anime
Year	Title	Role	Notes
2017	Boruto: Naruto Next Generations	Kyoho Fuefuki, Shin Uchiha, Bureau Chief Komame	
2017–2018	Marvel Future Avengers	Tony Stark / Iron Man, MODOK, Merlin	
2018	Bungo Stray Dogs	Howard Phillips Lovecraft	
2018	Modest Heroes	The Old Man	Segment: "Invisible"
2018–present	Baki	Umezawa, additional voices	4 episodes
2019	To the Abandoned Sacred Beasts	Cain Madhouse	
2019	Ultraman	Yapool	
2021	Mars Red	Sonosuke Nakajima	
2022	She Professed Herself Pupil of the Wise Man	Mira, Dunbalf Gandagore, Sakimori Kagami (Male)	
2022	Bastard!! Heavy Metal, Dark Fantasy	King of Metallicana, Nils Sean Mifune	
2023	My Happy Marriage	Minoru Tatsuishi	

=== Animation ===
List of voice performances in animation
Year	Title	Role	Notes
2010	Jonah Hex: Motion Comics	Various	
2010	Kung Fu Panda Holiday	Goose Attendant, Pig Tailor	Television special
2011–2016	Kung Fu Panda: Legends of Awesomeness	Po, Zeng, Qilin, Bad Po	
2012	The Avengers: Earth's Mightiest Heroes	Skuttlebutt A.I.	
2012–2013	T.U.F.F. Puppy	Caped Cod	
2013	The Mythical Show with Rhett and Link	Intro Voice	An internet show made by Rhett and Link at www.rhettandlink.com
2014–2016	Sofia the First	Sir Dax, Freedo, Nitelite, Bryce Twigley, King Henrick, Skinny Imp, Crispy, additional voices	
2015	Fresh Beat Band of Spies	Green Goose, Squash, D.E.R.P.	
2015	Lego Marvel Super Heroes: Avengers Reassembled	Tony Stark / Iron Man	Television special
2016	Star Fox Zero: The Battle Begins	General Pepper	Video short
2016	Breadwinners	Rusty	
2016	Voltron: Legendary Defender	Thace, additional voices	
2016	Pickle and Peanut	Additional voices	
2016	Lastman	Additional voices	2 episodes
2016–2017	The Fairly OddParents	Clark Carmichael	5 episodes
2017	The Anxiety Variety Kids Show	Knight Light	
2017	The Adventures of Kid Danger	Taco Whale Worker / High Ranking Volcaniac #1	
2017–2019	Guardians of the Galaxy	Tony Stark / Iron Man	6 episodes
2017–2019	Avengers Assemble	Tony Stark / Iron Man, Doctor Faustus	
2017–2020	Spider-Man	Tony Stark / Iron Man	6 episodes
2018	Blaze and the Monster Machines	Morgan Moose / Grizzly Bear 1	1 episode
2018	Turning Mecard	Phoenix / Teacher / El Topo	17 episodes
2018–2019	Kung Fu Panda: The Paws of Destiny	Po	Web series
2018–2020	Elena of Avalor	Martín / Lomo / Bruce Butterfrog	7 episodes
2019	Marvel Rising: Heart of Iron	Tony Stark / Iron Man	Television special
2021–2024	Arcane	Heimerdinger	Recurring role
2021–2024	What If...?	Tony Stark / Iron Man	Recurring role; 7 episodes
2022	The Cuphead Show!	Ludwig	Guest star; "Piano Lession"
2025	Your Friendly Neighborhood Spider-Man	Tony Stark / Iron Man	Episode: "Tangled Web"

=== Theme park attractions ===
List of voice performances in theme park attractions
Year	Title	Role	Notes
2017	Iron Man Experience	Iron Man	
2018	DreamWorks Theatre	Po	
2019	Ant-Man and The Wasp: Nano Battle!		

=== Video games ===
List of voice performances in video games
Year	Title	Role	Notes	Ref.
2004	World of Warcraft			
2008	Kung Fu Panda	Po, Zeng	Replacing Jack Black and Dan Fogler respectively	
2010	Mass Effect 2	Additional voices		
2011	Kung Fu Panda 2	Po	Replacing Jack Black	
2014	Hearthstone			
2014	Murdered: Soul Suspect	Additional voices		
2014	Marvel Contest of Champions	Iron Man		
2014	Lego Ninjago: Nindroids	Jay	Replacing Michael Adamthwaite	
2015	Lego Dimensions	Jay, Griffin Turner, Louis Tully	Replacing Michael Adamthwaite, Doron Bell, and Rick Moranis respectively	
2016	Ratchet & Clank	Brax		
2016	Teenage Mutant Ninja Turtles: Mutants in Manhattan	Raphael		
2016	Space Run: Galaxy	Mister Foxx		
2016	Mighty No. 9	Aviator		
2016	Star Ocean: Integrity and Faithlessness	Aaron		
2016	The Technomancer	Mutants, Additional voices		
2016	Titanfall 2	Kane		
2016	Akiba's Beat	Boss		
2017	Fire Emblem Heroes	Abel, Jeorge, Arden, Laslow		
2017	Puyo Puyo Tetris	Klug, Suketoudara		
2017	Fortnite	Additional Voices		
2018	Fist of the North Star: Lost Paradise	Targa		
2018	World of Warcraft: Battle for Azeroth	Additional Voices		
2018	Spider-Man	Additional Voices		
2018	Marvel Battle Lines	Tony Stark / Iron Man		
2018	Red Dead Redemption 2	The Local Pedestrian Population		
2019	Kingdom Hearts III	Lord Cutler Beckett	English dub	
2019	Puyo Puyo Champions	Suketoudara		
2019	Jumanji: The Video Game	Professor Sheldon Oberon		
2020	13 Sentinels: Aegis Rim	Shu Amiguchi	English dub	
2020	Yakuza: Like a Dragon	Additional voices	English dub	
2020	Puyo Puyo Tetris 2	Klug, Suketoudara	English dub	
2021	Akiba's Trip: Hellbound & Debriefed	Yatabe	English dub	
2022	Genshin Impact	Il Dottore	English dub	
2023	Dead Island 2	Max		Voice in announce trailer
2023	The Legend of Heroes: Trails into Reverie	The Emperor, Garcia Rossi, Soldiers & Citizens of Zemuria		
2023	Super Mario Bros. Wonder	Talking Flower	English dub	
2023	DreamWorks All-Star Kart Racing	Po		
2023	Jumanji: Wild Adventures	Professor Sheldon Oberon		
2024	Like a Dragon: Infinite Wealth	Additional voices	English dub	
2024	Puyo Puyo Puzzle Pop	Klug, Suketoudara	English dub	
2024	The Legend of Heroes: Trails Through Daybreak	Citizens	English dub	

=== Live-action ===
Year	Title	Role	Notes
2005	Dalton's Reward	Frank	Short film Also associate producer and casting
2011	Finding Hope Now	Young Roger	
2016	Arrow	Vigilante	Uncredited voice Live-action role
