= 9to5Mac =

American tech news website

- Website type: News website
- Available in: English
- Owner: Seth Weintraub
- Website: 9to5mac.com
- Commercial: Yes
- Launched: March 15, 2007; 19 years ago
- Current status: Online

9to5Mac is a website covering news and rumors about Apple Inc. and its products. Founded by Seth Weintraub, the website is the oldest in Weintraub's 9to5 network of tech blogs, which also includes 9to5Google, 9to5Toys, DroneDJ, and Electrek.

As one of many Apple news websites, the site drastically rose in traffic in its earlier years for publishing the first photos of the third-generation iPod Nano, the original iPod Touch, early images of the first iPhone, etc. 9to5Mac has developed and implemented its affiliate program for freelance writers to earn from advertising banners being shown on their articles' pages.

== History ==
9to5Mac was founded in 2007 by Seth Weintraub as an Apple news website initially focused on Macs in the enterprise. In June 2016, Mark Gurman, one of the world's most influential Apple reporters, left 9to5Mac for Bloomberg News. He wrote articles for 9to5Mac for seven years. Gurman's scoops include uncovering iSlate.com and confirming a tablet was coming from Apple back in 2009. He’s also leaked news about Siri, iOS 7, the first Retina iMacs, and 2015's 12-inch MacBook before the company’s special events.

In 2012, in a research paper entitled The Outreach of Digital Libraries: A Globalized Resource Network (Taipei) 9to5Mac was ranked as having the highest Jaccard index among Mac-related websites, including MacRumors.

== Incidents ==
In 2018, Guilherme Rambo paid a source around $500 in Bitcoin in exchange for leaked Apple company data. He wrote an article billed as an "exclusive" look at new features for the then-upcoming iPad Pro. This contradicted the rules of 9to5Mac. Later 9to5Mac updated the story, removing its content and replacing it with a disclaimer: "Update: This post has been removed due to 9to5mac's sourcing policies."
