= Tamir Saban =

American basketball player

No. 7 – Paisas Basketball
- Position: Shooting guard / point guard
- League: Baloncesto Profesional Colombiano

Personal information
- Born: October 19, 1999 (age 27)
- Listed height: 6 ft 3 in (1.91 m)

Career information
- High school: Milken Community Schools (Los Angeles, California); Crossroads School (Santa Monica, California)
- College: El Camino College (2018–2019)
- NBA draft: 2020: undrafted
- Playing career: 2019–present

Career history
- 2019–2021: Ironi Ness Ziona B.C.
- 2021–2022: Maccabi Rishon LeZion
- 2022-2024: Maccabi Haifa
- 2024–present: Paisas Basketball

Tamir “Seth” Saban (Hebrew: תמיר סבן; born October 19, 1999) is an American-Israeli professional basketball player for Paisas Basketball of the premier professional basketball championship in Colombia. Standing at 6 ft 3 in (1.91 meters), he primarily plays at the shooting guard and point guard positions.

In 2015, he attended Milken Community Schools, where he led the school's basketball team in average points per game during the 2015–2016 basketball season.

The following year (2016–2017), Saban transferred to and played basketball for Crossroads School in Santa Monica, California. Saban graduated from the Crossroads School in 2018.

He then attended and played basketball for El Camino College.
