= Milken Community School =

Coordinates: 34°07′31.91″N 118°28′40.38″W

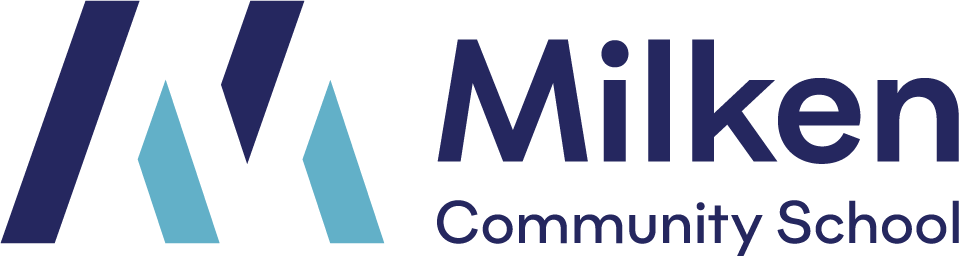
- Milken Community School logo

Location
- 15800 Zeldins' Way; Los Angeles, California 90049; United States

Information
- Type: Private, coeducational 6-12
- Motto: Developing students with sharp minds, generous hearts, and kind souls
- Religious affiliation: Jewish
- Established: 1990
- CEEB code: 051727
- Head of school: Sarah Shulkind
- Faculty: 145 (2014-2015)
- Enrollment: 750
- Colors: Blue and white
- Nickname: Wildcats
- Newspaper: The Roar
- Yearbook: Visions
- Website: www.milkenschool.org

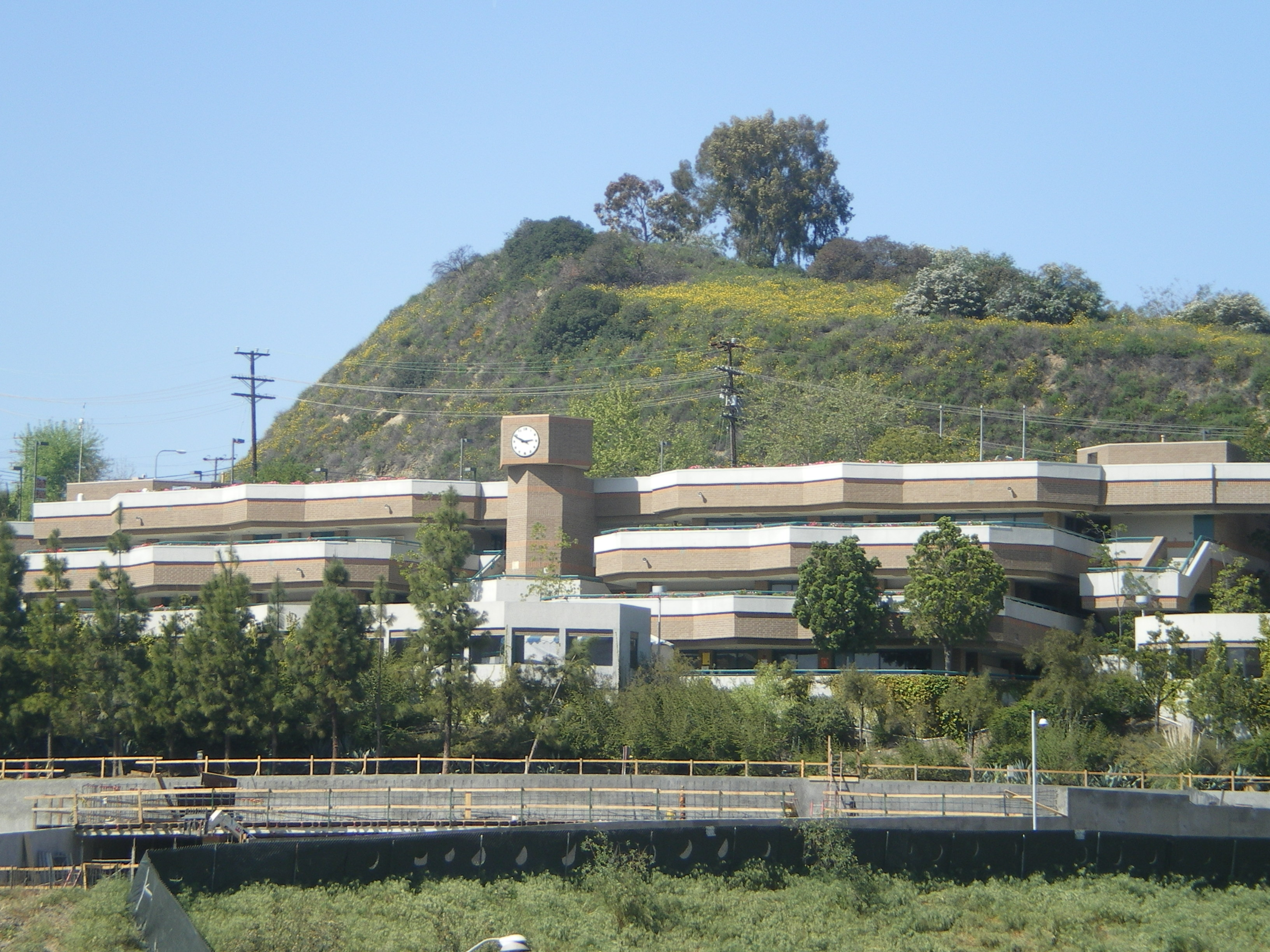
Milken Community High School

Milken Community School (originally Milken Community Schools, colloquially Milken) is a private Jewish high school and middle school. It is located on Mulholland Drive in the Bel Air area of Los Angeles, California. It is one of the largest Jewish day schools in the United States. Long affiliated with Stephen S. Wise Temple, a Reform congregation, the school is officially non-denominational, and became independent from the temple in July 2012. Despite the separation, Milken Community Schools continues to be the school in which many Stephen S. Wise students are enrolled.

In 1998, Milken was the largest non-Orthodox Jewish high school in the United States. As of 1994, it was the only Reform Jewish high school in the United States and was a part of the only K-12 Jewish education program west of Chicago that was not a part of Orthodox Judaism.

== History ==
The school began in Van Nuys in 1984 as the Golda Meir School, and was later renamed the Einstein Academy. When the school became affiliated with Stephen S. Wise Temple, it was renamed Stephen S. Wise High School. After a large donation from Lowell and Michael Milken's Milken Family Foundation in 1995, the school, then reported to be the "largest non-Orthodox Jewish high school in the country", was named Milken Community High School. At the beginning of the 2013–2014 school year, the school was renamed to Milken Community Schools, with the intention of creating a name that encompassed both the middle school and the high school.

The Upper School was held in temporary trailers, on the lot where the new Middle School now stands, from 1994 to 1998 until the current, first three buildings of the Upper School campus opened in 1998. A year later in November 1999, the fourth and final building opened that completed the Upper School campus. The Upper School campus had a cost of $30 million, and was built by MATT construction. Ten years later, the Saperstein Middle School campus was completed and opened in 2009. Previously, the Middle School occupied temporary trailers on the parking lot of the Bel Air Presbyterian Church from 1981 to 2008.

The Middle School and Upper School have historically had the same name, yet after the completion of the new Middle School campus in 2009, the Middle School was officially renamed the David and Hillevi Saperstein Middle School of Milken Community High School after a subsequent donation from David and Hillevi Saperstein, while the Upper School remained the Milken Community High School.

On March 25, 2011, Milken Community High School and Stephen S. Wise Temple announced that the school would become independent from the temple effective July 1, 2012.

American Jewish University had its Familian campus at 15600 Mulholland Drive, directly across the freeway from the Milken campus. Milken had long sought an arrangement to share facilities with the university, but unsuccessfully. In February 2022, AJU announced plans to sell the location. Milken made a bid of approximately $60 million, but was outbid by a Swiss learning company. That deal fell through amid community opposition. On Tuesday, December 26, 2023, Milken announced that it had successfully reached a deal to buy the campus. An official groundbreaking ceremony for the campus took place on November 9, 2025. In June 2026, the newly acquired campus was renamed the Jan Koum Campus, thanks to a generous $36 million gift from the Koum Family Foundation.

== Judaism ==
All students were required to take four years of Hebrew, of which 18 different levels are offered; but as of the beginning of the 2018 school year, the new administration dropped this requirement. Hebrew is now optional as a course, but many students still choose to partake in it. Four years of Jewish studies are still required, and are offered at college-preparatory, honors, and high honors levels (9th-Jewish Law, 10th-Chumash, 11th-Jewish Law, 12th-Jewish Thought). Spiritual Practice takes place once a week, with varied options such as traditional-egalitarian minyan, yoga, meditation, doubters' minyan, and others. An optional daily morning minyan is also offered. Through the Advanced Jewish Studies Center (AJSC), numerous Judaic electives are offered, including comparative religion, intensive Talmud study, comparative film, and others.

== Tiferet Israel Fellowship ==
Tiferet Israel Fellowship

In partnership with the Alexander Muss Institute for Israel Education (AMIIE), MCHS offers an opportunity for students to learn and live in Israel during the spring semester of the 10th grade. Through a full academic program, schedule of tiyyulim (field study and trips), personalized chuggim (individualized activities) and partnership with Israeli teens, Tiferet Israel Fellows learn inside and outside of the classroom and build relationships with the land and people of Israel. The semester abroad is followed by two years of additional programming. The junior year focuses on public presentation skills, training fellows how to best advocate for the State of Israel. The senior year concludes with an intensive seminar based at the Shalom Hartman Institute in Jerusalem, in which students examine Israeli cultural and political issues.

== Extracurricular activities ==
The FIRST Robotics Competition team, the MilkenKnights, was a finalist at the Los Angeles Regional in 2012 and the Orange County Regional in 2016. They have won several awards, including two Dean's List Finalist Awards (Nathan Schloss in 2010 and Jared Hasen-Klein in 2017). In 2010, the team became one of the first American robotics teams to compete in the Israeli FIRST robotics regional.

The school has won at least one Pete Conrad Spirit of Innovation Award for every year that the competition has been running.

=== Sports ===
In the fall of 2011, after the previous year held an undefeated season and championship for the Wildcats' flag football team, Milken began to play tackle football in the Heritage League. They play their games on Thursday nights instead of the traditional Friday night because the latter is the Jewish Sabbath.

== Notable alumni ==
- Amir Blumenfeld, comedian
- Max Borenstein, screenwriter
- Skyler Gisondo, actor
- Mark Gurman, technology journalist
- Sean Rad, creator of Tinder
- Tamir Saban, American-Israeli basketball player
- Asher Vollmer, game designer and creator of the Apple Design Award winner Threes!; featured in the 2015 Forbes' "30 under 30" list

== See also ==
- Jews in Los Angeles
