= Piranha Plant =

Character from the Mario franchise

- Mario race
- Promotional art by Shigehisa Nakaue (2016)
- First appearance: Super Mario Bros. (1985)

In-universe information
- Leader: Bowser

The Piranha Plant, known as Packun Flower (パックンフラワー, Pakkun Furawā) in Japan, is a fictional recurring plant species from Nintendo's Mario franchise. A recognizable member of antagonist Bowser's army, it first appeared in Super Mario Bros., a 1985 platform game for the Nintendo Entertainment System, and is usually seen as a leafy green stalk topped with a white-spotted red or green globe, with a maw lined with sharp teeth reminiscent of those of piranhas.

Piranha Plants are typically portrayed as tethered enemies that periodically emerge from green "Warp Pipes" scattered throughout the game world that player characters must evade or overcome. Multiple subspecies with different abilities and physical attributes have appeared in various titles; some may simply stick up from the ground, and in some cases even walk freely on their own roots. Making direct physical contact with a Piranha Plant usually results in a player taking damage and losing a portion of their health.

Regarded as one of the most iconic enemies of the Mario franchise, the Piranha Plant has appeared in nearly every video game in the franchise since its debut. This includes its role as a playable character in Super Smash Bros. Ultimate, a 2018 crossover fighting game for the Nintendo Switch, being added as downloadable content in 2019. This iteration of the character has been met with a generally positive reception.

== Concept and creation ==
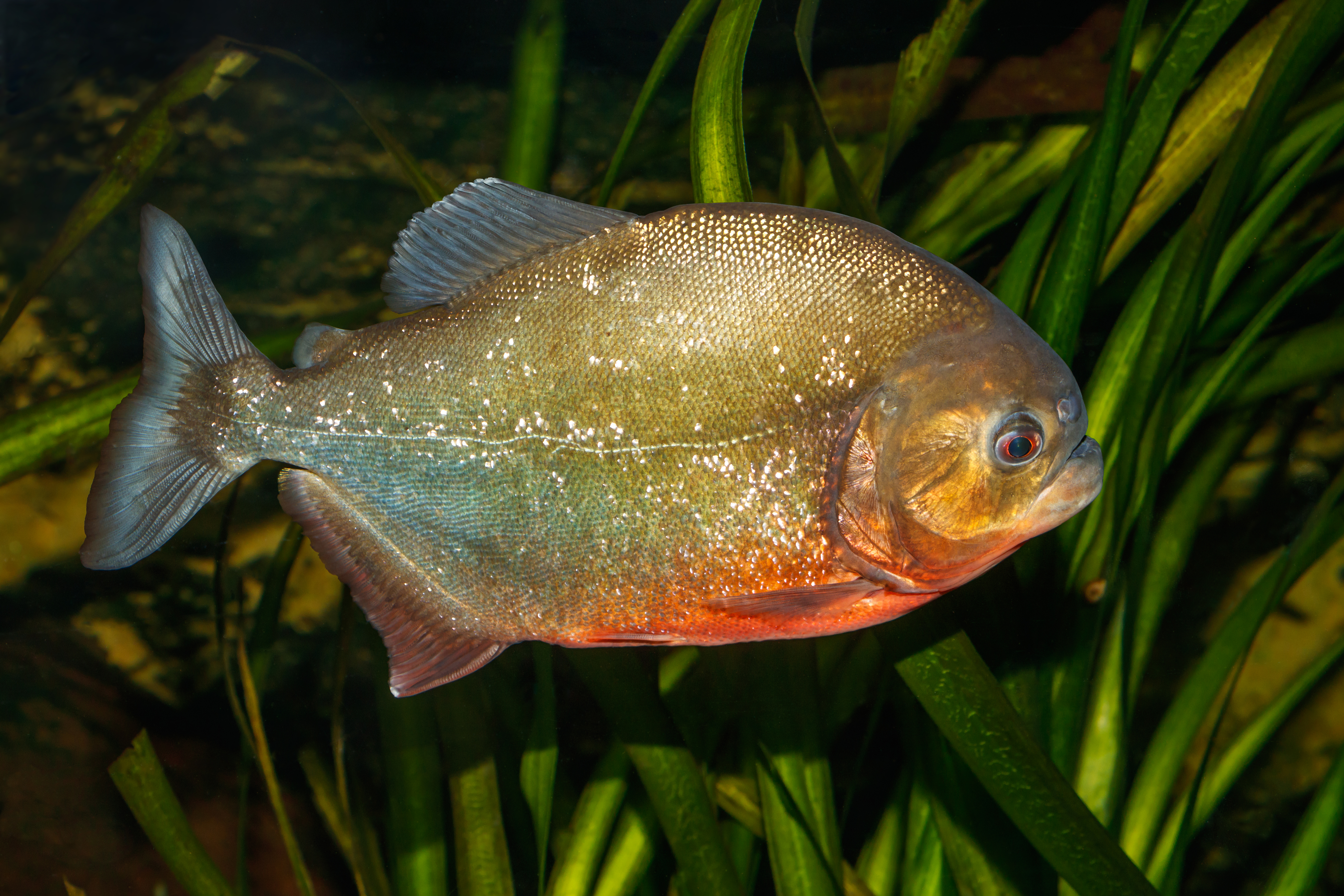
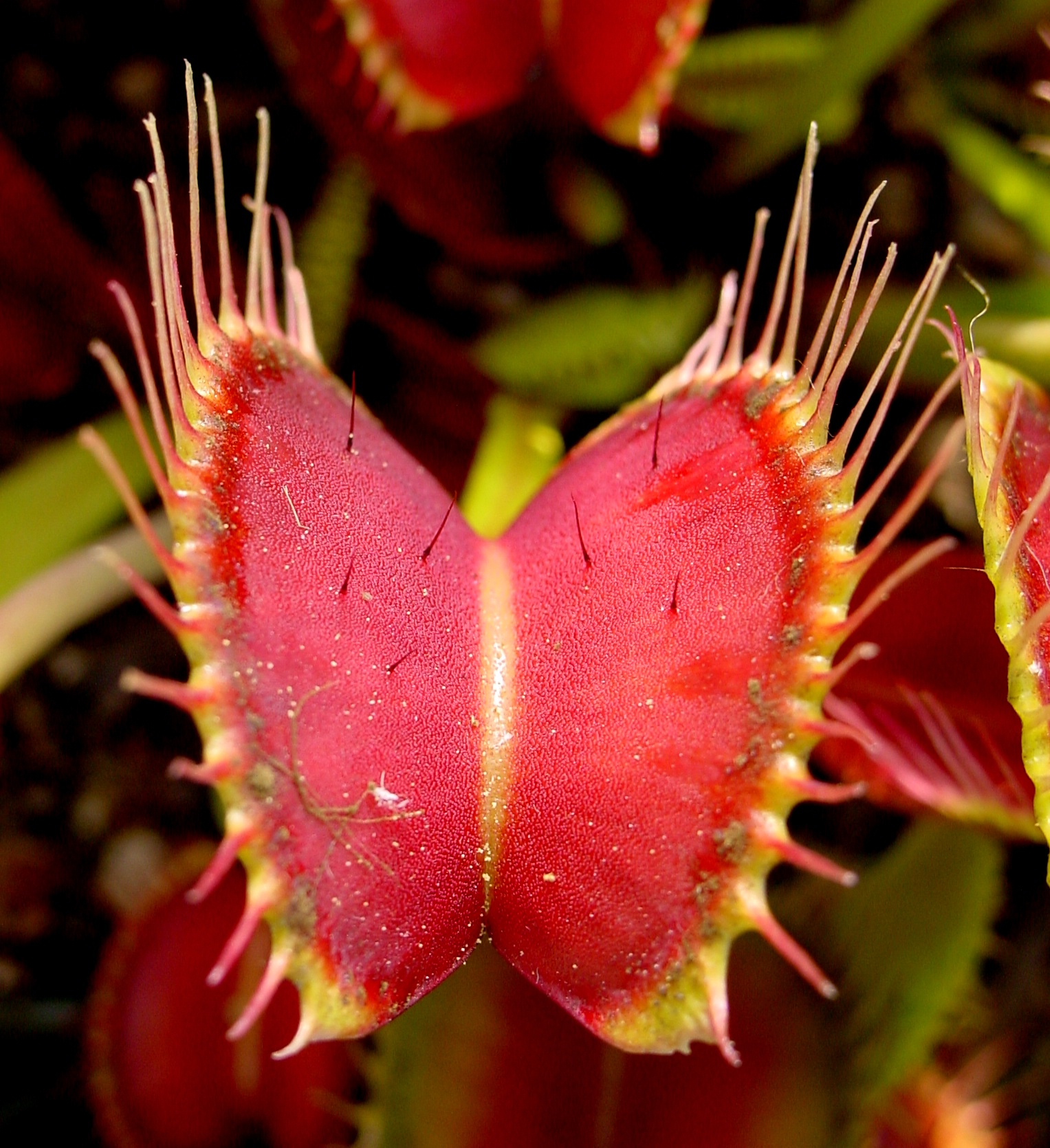
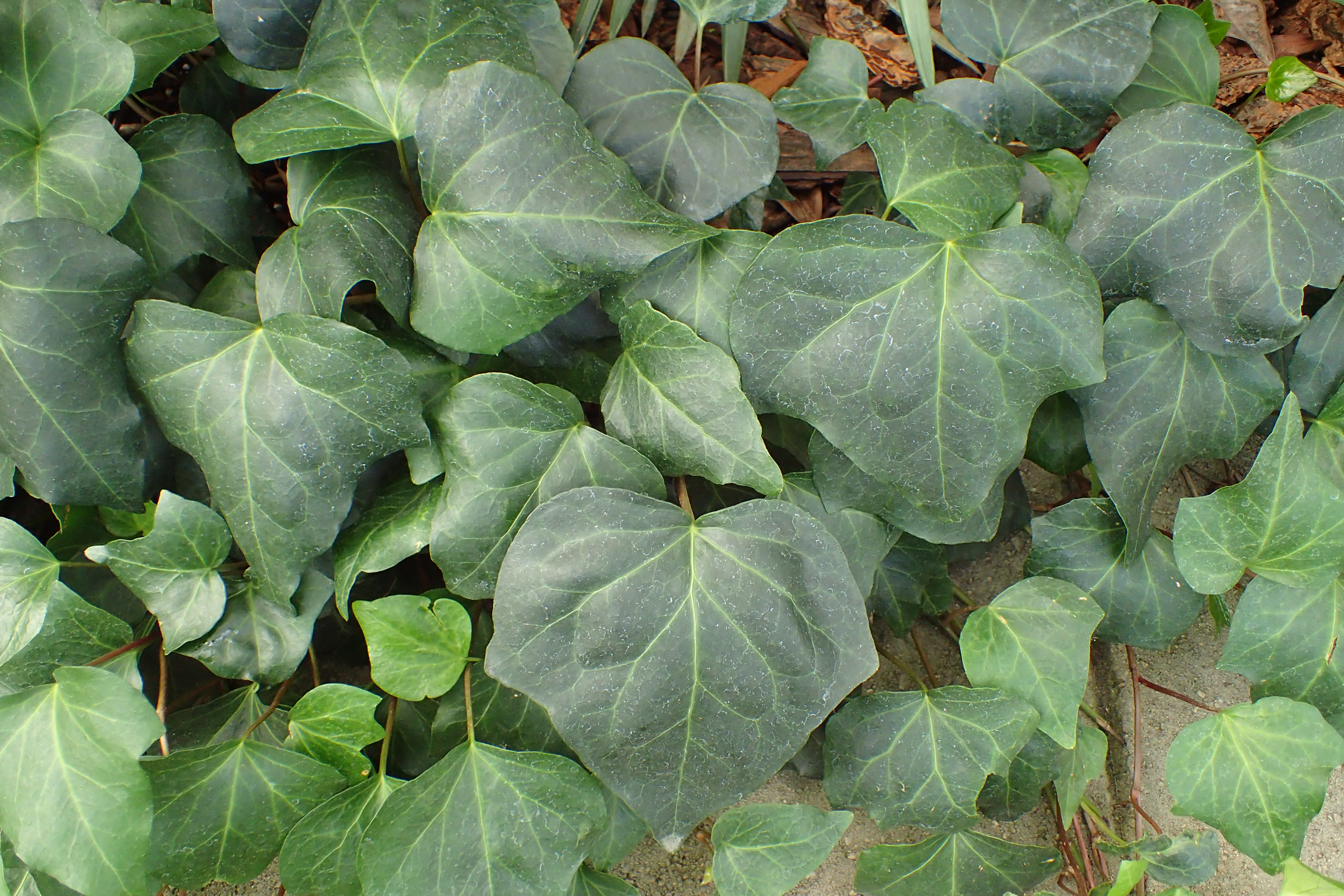
The Piranha Plant has sharp teeth similar to those of a piranha (left), while its behavior resembles that of a Venus flytrap (center), and its body resembles ivy (right).

Piranha Plants first appeared in Super Mario Bros., a 1985 platform game for the Nintendo Entertainment System. They were originally depicted as stationary green carnivorous plants confined to green "Warp Pipes" bristling out of the game world, lying in wait for prey to come within range like a Venus flytrap. Within the context of video game design, the Piranha Plant is a low-risk hazard tied to a single location within the game world, akin to a trap. The purpose behind its design is to create platforms that are temporarily safe and sometimes dangerous, occupying a role between an environmental challenge and an enemy challenge for the player character.

A harmful characteristic of the Piranha Plant is its maw, which is pointed upwards and full of sharp teeth. This serves as an important visual cue for the player not to let their character touch it from above, which shapes the player's expectations for the remainder of the game as part of its ongoing visual vocabulary. Later titles subvert the notion that player characters cannot come into physical contact with a Piranha Plant without being harmed. For instance, in Super Mario 64 (1996), players can safely dispatch a Piranha Plant by having the player character Mario execute a stomp attack on it while airborne. Furthermore, in Super Mario 3D World (2013), players can pick up Piranha Plants that grow in pots by holding the run button, allowing them to use the Piranha Plant's bites to eat enemies and stun other players in the multiplayer game mode.

== Appearances ==
=== Mario franchise ===
The original green Piranha Plant debuted in the "World 1-2" level of Super Mario Bros. Its method of hunting and feeding appears to involve raising its head into the air and biting anything that crosses its path at that exact moment. However, it will not emerge from its pipe if the player character is standing next to it. Piranha Plants have appeared in almost every Super Mario game since, often with some changes in their presentation as well as combat design. Although regular Piranha Plants can be defeated with a single fireball, larger specimens must be defeated with multiple fireballs.

A red version of the Piranha Plant appears in Super Mario Bros.: The Lost Levels (1986). Reflecting the intentional elevated difficulty of The Lost Levels, this version has a faster movement pattern than its green counterpart and pops out of its pipe even if the player character is adjacent to it. Super Mario Bros. 3 (1988) introduced the Venus Fire Trap (also known as the Fire Piranha Plant), a Piranha Plant subspecies that can appear out of pipes and spit fireballs at player characters when they are nearby. In a break with visual conventions from earlier games, the Venus Fire Trap's head is turned to the side and aimed at the player character, while the top of its head is a smooth and round surface. Another Piranha Plant variant introduced in Super Mario Bros. 3 is the Ptooie, which walks around on its roots and exhales air to lift a projectile, usually a spiked ball, into the air to hinder the player character's progress.

In Super Mario 64, Piranha Plants sleep peacefully until Mario comes near them, at which point they wake up and begin snapping blindly at the air. In New Super Mario Bros. U (2012), Piranha Plants rarely retreat into pipes, instead appearing out in the open and constantly gnashing their teeth, occasionally walking on moving platforms. In Super Mario Odyssey (2017), Mario can transform into Piranha Plants that spit poison or fireballs by throwing a rock into one's mouth and then tossing Cappy, a magical hat that serves as Mario's companion, at the plant's head. As either type of Piranha Plant, Mario can shoot projectiles that defeat other enemies. The Piranha Plant was added as a playable character in Dr. Mario World (2019) on December 16, 2020. It was subsequently added as a playable character in Mario Tennis Aces (2018) in June 2019. The Piranha Plant later became a racer in Mario Kart World (2025), marking its debut as a playable character in the Mario Kart series.

Miscellaneous appearances of the Piranha Plant within the extended Mario franchise include its presence as an item in Mario Kart 8 (2014) and its 2017 port for the Nintendo Switch. In both versions of the game, it is used to bite and flip over racers close to the player, as well as eat objects like banana peels in front of the player to prevent collisions. In the 2017 port, Piranha Plants can be used in the new Battle game mode Renegade Roundup, which has players using Piranha Plants as cops to catch the other team as robbers. A Piranha Plant puppet called Izzy appeared as the sidekick to the host of The Play Nintendo Show, a YouTube series that showcased Nintendo games, beginning in 2016.

Yoshi's Island (1995) features a Piranha Plant known as Naval Piranha, who is fought as the boss enemy of the third world. Although Naval Piranha is normally enlarged by Kamek's magic prior to the battle, the player character Yoshi can launch an egg at the Piranha Plant beforehand to skip the fight, which results in Kamek exclaiming "OH MY!!!" and flying away. Super Mario Sunshine (2002) introduced Petey Piranha, a massive, flying, mutated Piranha Plant who is also fought as a boss enemy. Petey Piranha has gone on to appear as a boss in various other Mario games, including Mario & Luigi: Paper Jam (2015) and Mario Tennis Aces. Moreover, Petey Piranha has been featured as a playable character in kart racing games and sports video games such as Mario Kart: Double Dash (2003), Mario Kart 8 Deluxe, Mario Tennis Aces, Dr. Mario World, and Mario Kart Tour (2019), in some cases being added as part of downloadable content (DLC). Super Mario Galaxy (2007) introduced another oversized Piranha Plant variant known as Dino Piranha – which has a large club on the end of its tail – as well as a fiery version of Dino Piranha. Super Mario Bros. Wonder (2023) features a new variant known as Trottin' Piranha Plants, which walk around outside of pipes.

=== Other appearances ===
The Piranha Plant has made numerous cameo appearances outside of Mario franchise media. In The Legend of Zelda: Link's Awakening (1993) and its 2019 remake, Piranha Plants appear as enemies in dungeons, and in the latter game, the Piranha Plant is one of multiple Mario collectibles that can be won from a crane game. In Lego City Undercover (2013), which features several references to the Mario franchise in the form of Easter eggs, the player can water a green Warp Pipe to sprout a Fire Piranha Plant. Piranha Plants also appear in a Yoshi-themed side-scrolling level added to the Wii U version of Sonic Lost World (2013) as DLC.

In January 2019, the Piranha Plant was added via DLC as the first post-release playable character in Super Smash Bros. Ultimate (2018). The game's director, Masahiro Sakurai, stated that he chose the Piranha Plant as a post-release addition because he considered it to be a very well-known character and felt that making it a complimentary early purchase bonus as part of a limited-time offer would be an effective promotional effort. While Sakurai acknowledged that the Piranha Plant is an example of a playable character that lies outside of players' typical expectations, he emphasized that having a good balance is prioritized over the element of surprise when it comes to the planning of the game's roster. The species also appears in the animated film The Super Mario Bros. Movie (2023) and its sequel, The Super Mario Galaxy Movie (2026); in the latter, the antagonist Bowser Jr. is able to use a magic paintbrush to spawn Piranha Plants.

== Promotion and merchandise ==
Piranha Plants are presented as prominent attractions in the Super Nintendo World themed area at Universal Studios theme parks. A minigame akin to Whac-A-Mole, known as Piranha Plant Nap Mishap, involves up to four players repeatedly slapping the tops of 12 oversized ringing alarm clocks to silence them before they fully "awaken" a massive Piranha Plant that looms overhead.

A variety of merchandise depicting the Piranha Plant has been produced, including a hand puppet, slippers, and an LED lamp with a light-emitting diode hidden in the Piranha Plant's maw. An Amiibo figurine depicting the Piranha Plant was released in February 2019 following its addition to Super Smash Bros. Ultimate. A LEGO set based on the Piranha Plant was launched in November 2023. A webcam stylized after the Piranha Plant was made available on June 5, 2025, the same date of the Nintendo Switch 2's launch. Epoch Games produced a board game centered around the character called Super Mario Piranha Plant Escape!; its gameplay revolves around players rolling dice and advancing figurines that represent Mario and Luigi while attempting to avoid an impending attack from the Piranha Plant centerpiece.

== Reception ==
Several media outlets have highlighted the Piranha Plant's status as an iconic enemy in the Mario franchise. The Piranha Plant has appeared in numerous "top" character lists compiled by video game publications, such as IGN, 1UP.com, and GameDaily. The addition of the Piranha Plant as a playable character in Super Smash Bros. Ultimate drew an enthusiastic response from video game publications, as well as players. Although some players encountered technical issues with unlocking the character or experienced data corruption of their save files following the DLC's installation, overall post-release response from both casual and professional players to the Piranha Plant's addition to the game's roster was generally favorable.

IGN lauded the gameplay mechanics for the Piranha Plant in their initial impression of the DLC additions shortly after their launch. In an in-depth review of the DLC material, Justin Berube from Nintendo World Report stated that he originally had reservations about the Piranha Plant taking up a roster spot at the expense of a more prominent character like Waluigi, though the Piranha Plant's playstyle grew on him. Berube wrote that the Piranha Plant's "moves allow for some creative uses and provide fun and unique gameplay", complimented the character's victory poses at the end of matches, and concluded that the new fighter was "extremely unique and fun to play". However, Berube expressed concern that the Piranha Plant could be easily overpowered by projectiles during competitive matches. Writing for Kotaku, Cecilia D'Anastasio summarized the Piranha Plant's gameplay as "sluggish but fun". Although D'Anastasio faulted some of the character's moves for being predictable and somewhat difficult to aim properly, she lauded its "toolkit" for allowing players to control space on a stage, defend against aerial fighters, and interlock moves to form combos. Overall, D'Anastasio deemed the Piranha Plant to be "a super fun fighter that adds something fresh and leafy to Smash Ultimate's roster". Although GameRevolution's Tyler Treese acknowledged player disappointment about the Piranha Plant taking up a roster space that could have been used for a more traditional character, he praised the level of detail in the fighter's moveset as both meticulous and incredible, opining that "Piranha Plant winds up representing everything that is special about Super Smash Bros. Ultimate."

Gavin Lane from Nintendo Life was unimpressed with the announcement that the Piranha Plant would be added as a playable character in Dr. Mario World in December 2020, and mocked Nintendo for "scraping the barrel". Lowell Bell, writing for The Escapist, believed that their appearance in Super Mario Bros. Wonder made for some of the best levels in the game, as the Piranha Plants provided "an adorable and catchy Piranha dance routine" that establishes the tone in its second level. Similarly, Tomas Franzese of Digital Trends stated that the singing Piranha Plants were one of the best Wonder Effects in the game, describing it as "joyously absurd".
