= Mario Tennis Fever =

2026 video game

- Developer: Camelot Software Planning
- Publisher: Nintendo
- Directors: Shugo Takahashi; Tomohiro Yamamura
- Producers: Hiroyuki Takahashi; Shugo Takahashi; Shinya Saito
- Designers: Hiroyuki Takahashi; Shugo Takahashi
- Programmers: Yutaka Yamamoto; Akira Koike; Toshihiro Moriya
- Artists: Satoshi Tamai; Takeshi Tateishi
- Composer: Motoi Sakuraba
- Series: Mario Tennis
- Platform: Nintendo Switch 2
- Release: February 12, 2026
- Genre: Sports
- Modes: Single-player, multiplayer

Mario Tennis Fever (Note: Japanese: マリオテニス フィーバー, Hepburn: Mario Tenisu Fībā) is a 2026 sports video game developed by Camelot Software Planning and published by Nintendo for the Nintendo Switch 2. The game is part of the Mario Tennis series, and is the successor to the Nintendo Switch game Mario Tennis Aces (2018). Mario Tennis Fever introduces Fever Rackets, which can perform powerful Fever Shots with a variety of different effects. Additionally, elements from the platform game Super Mario Bros. Wonder (2023) are integrated into the setting. The game contains an Adventure game mode in which the Mario cast have to re-learn how to compete in tennis after being transformed into babies. The game received mixed to positive reviews from critics upon release.

== Gameplay ==
A doubles match featuring Mario and Bowser on one team against Peach and Daisy

The gameplay of Mario Tennis Fever consists of playing matches of tennis as 38 characters from the Mario franchise, which is the most in the series' history. The character roster also includes the debut appearance of Baby Waluigi. The game features 30 different rackets, each with their own abilities. Multiple game modes exist, including "Tournament", "Trial Towers" and "Mix It Up". Tournaments contain live sports commentary from the Talking Flower introduced in Super Mario Bros. Wonder (2023). In Trial Towers, the player competes in a series of challenges to reach the top of the tower. The Mix It Up mode consists of multiple different game types, including Ring Shot and court matches with specific gimmicks, such as feeding Piranha Plants during the Forest Court Match. One of these takes place on the Wonder Court, which includes the Wonder Effects from Super Mario Bros. Wonder.

During matches, players can now perform slide and leap shots on their opponents. The game's main mechanic is the introduction of 30 "Fever Rackets", which allow the player to perform a variety of effects during a match, by building up a "Fever Gauge", then performing "Fever Shots". Fever Shots can have advantages for the player, such as causing the opponent's side of the field to have an icy patch where the ball bounces, or making Mini Mushrooms appear, which can shrink the opponent. If the player acts quickly, they can return a Fever Shot before it hits the ground and return the effects to their opponent's side of the court. If the player takes too much damage, their health will deplete and they will be KO-ed, temporarily removed from the match to heal. Fever Rackets can be disabled to play "Classic Tennis". The software is compatible with GameShare, allowing users to share and receive the game for multiplayer modes. Additionally, by scanning Amiibo figures of Mario characters, the design of the tennis ball will change to a special design based on the character.

== Plot ==
Princess Daisy falls gravely ill before the Mushroom Kingdom Tennis Tournament, much to the concern of her friends, Mario, Luigi, Princess Peach, Toad, and Donkey Kong. The group are soon approached by Wario and Waluigi, who inform them of a magical golden fruit on a remote island that can cure Daisy. Via Peach's airship, the party travel to the island, where Mario and Luigi successfully find the golden fruit. Meanwhile, Wario and Waluigi search for treasure on the island and accidentally provoke three mysterious beasts, which curse Mario, Luigi, Peach, Wario, and Waluigi into becoming babies.

Returning to the Mushroom Kingdom, Mario and Luigi are taken to the Mushroom Tennis Academy, where they receive training in order to defeat the monsters that cursed them. After graduating from the academy, Mario and Luigi board Peach's airship and begin their journey back to the monsters' island, accompanied by several Toads, Wario, and Waluigi, only for the latter two to betray them by setting the airship on fire with Flame Rackets. After Mario and Luigi put out the fire, it is revealed that Wario and Waluigi are working with Bowser, who wants to have the monsters defeated himself in order to win over Peach.

Due to the airship malfunctioning, Mario, Luigi, and the Toads land it at sea, where they continue their journey to the island. Throughout their journey, the group is joined by Donkey Kong, Daisy (who has regained her strength thanks to the golden fruit), and Peach (who was kidnapped by Bowser earlier). The party eventually find and defeat two of the three monsters, restoring Luigi and Peach's adult forms. They are soon confronted by Bowser, who wants to use the monsters' power for himself. The group manage to defeat Bowser and the last monster, which completely undoes the baby curse. Afterwards, the group decide to fix Daisy's airship in order to escape the island and return to the Mushroom Kingdom.

== Development ==
Mario Tennis Fever was announced in a Nintendo Direct presentation on September 12, 2025, during the introductory segment celebrating the 40th anniversary of Super Mario Bros. (1985). The reveal presented both old and new gameplay mechanics, the new story mode, and announced that the game would be released on February 12, 2026. A five-minute trailer for the game was uploaded on January 8, 2026, detailing the available game modes, character roster, and gameplay mechanics. The first color options for Joy-Con 2 controllers, "Light Purple and Light Green", launched alongside the release of Mario Tennis Fever.

== Reception ==
Reception

Aggregate scores
Aggregator	Score
Metacritic	76/100 (Note: Based on 115 reviews)
OpenCritic	76% recommend (Note: Based on 105 reviews)

Review scores
Publication	Score
Destructoid	8/10
Famitsu	9/10, 8/10, 9/10, 8/10
Game Informer	7.5/10
GameSpot	8/10
GamesRadar+	3.5/5
Giant Bomb	3/5
IGN	7/10
Nintendo Life	8/10
PCMag	4.5/5
Shacknews	8/10

Mario Tennis Fever received generally favorable reviews from critics, according to the review aggregation website Metacritic. Fellow review aggregator OpenCritic assessed that the game received strong approval from critics. In Japan, four critics from Famitsu gave the game a total score of 34 out of 40.

IGN's Logan Plant commended the game for its "exciting multiplayer moments, great controls, and a huge character roster" while viewing Adventure Mode as "more of an extended tutorial than an actual adventure". In his review for Nintendo Life, PJ O'Reilly referred to Mario Tennis Fever as his "favourite game in the series thus far, by finding an addictive balance between Mario's madcap antics and real-world tennis fun", though he criticized the lack of single-player content, as well as Adventure Mode, which he viewed as "a letdown" for being "disappointingly short and rather basic".

Reviewing the game for PCMag, Jordan Minor summarized Mario Tennis Fever as "a must-have Switch 2 game that I recommend to anyone who fancies a bonkers spin on traditional racket competition", praising the game modes, "[c]risp, colorful" presentation, and unlockables while criticizing the linearity of Adventure Mode, as well as mild lag in online matches. Donovan Erskine of Shacknews deemed Mario Tennis Fever "a competent tennis game with plenty of variation and a high skill ceiling", particularly for its on-court gameplay, extensive character roster, and new Fever Racket gimmick. Steve Watts of GameSpot felt that the Fever Rackets helped create "the best Mario sports game in years", as well as viewing Adventure Mode as "a short and sweet story with lots of variety and clever boss fights".

Several critics highlighted the high price. On Giant Bomb, Jeff Grubb felt, "the mechanics are solid, but nothing outside of the core tennis gameplay is that much fun...At $70? A game like Fever feels lazy and rote." Canadian Broadcasting Corporation critic Jonathan Ore praised the game yet opined that, "the untapped potential of the Adventure mode and the disappointingly small number of Mix It Up modes can make the high cost of entry — $100 Cdn, in line with the Switch 2's higher cost per game compared to its predecessor — a difficult serving, even for fans. The review from The A.V. Club felt that despite the overall competence of the game, Nintendo was wasting the potential of the developing studio, with critic Dia Lacina openly calling for Camelot Software to make a new RPG; "Instead of hamstringing the company that gave us Golden Sun...Stop asking the Takahashis and their studio to sleepwalk through Mario-branded sports games, and let them cook again."
