= Mark Gurman =

Mark Gurman may refer to:

- Mark Gurman (footballer), Kazakhstani professional association football player
- Mark Gurman (journalist), American technology journalist
