= Mark Gurman (journalist) =

American technology journalist

- Born: 1993 or 1994 (age 32–33)
- Education: University of Michigan (BS)
- Occupation: Technology journalist
- Years active: 2010–present
- Website: markgurman.com

Mark Gurman (born c. 1994) is an American technology journalist, specializing in Apple news. Gurman began his career while in high school in Los Angeles, writing for 9to5Mac. He has written for Bloomberg News since his 2016 graduation from the University of Michigan School of Information. Gurman is known for publishing scoops on upcoming Apple products, developing a reputation for accurate predictions as early as 2012.

== Biography ==
Mark Gurman is the son of two Los Angeles-based real estate agents, and grew up in Southern California. He attended Milken Community High School in the Bel Air neighborhood of Los Angeles. Gurman began reporting on technology news while in high school, gaining widespread recognition in late 2009 when he discovered a domain registration for "islate.com" linked to Apple. MacRumors reported on the domain registration as evidence of an upcoming tablet computer from Apple, which was ultimately announced as the iPad in January 2010.

Gurman began writing for Apple news blog 9to5Mac in his sophomore year of high school, under the mentorship of the site's founder Seth Weintraub. After graduating from high school in 2012, Gurman applied to the University of Southern California Annenberg School for Communication and Journalism, but was not accepted. He enrolled at the University of Michigan School of Information, and continued writing for 9to5Mac throughout college. Gurman studied information science at Michigan, as a member of the first graduating class of the Bachelor of Science in Information program. He was listed in the 2015 edition of Forbes 30 Under 30.

Gurman graduated from Michigan in 2016. He was hired by Bloomberg News shortly after graduating, and was named Bloomberg's managing editor for consumer technology in 2025. Gurman has served on the University of Michigan School of Information Advisory Board since 2025.

== Personal life ==
As of 2025, Gurman is married and lives in Los Angeles.
