= Super Mario Bros. Wonder =

2023 video game

- Menu icon
- Developer: Nintendo EPD
- Publisher: Nintendo
- Director: Shiro Mouri
- Producer: Takashi Tezuka
- Designers: Koichi Hayashida; Terumasa Kato; Shigefumi Hino
- Programmer: Hiroshi Umemiya
- Artist: Masanobu Sato
- Composers: Koji Kondo; Shiho Fujii; Sayako Doi; Chisaki Shimazu
- Series: Super Mario
- Platforms: Nintendo Switch; Nintendo Switch 2
- Release: Nintendo Switch; October 20, 2023; Nintendo Switch 2 March 26, 2026
- Genre: Platform
- Modes: Single-player, multiplayer

Super Mario Bros. Wonder (Note: Japanese: スーパーマリオブラザーズ ワンダー, Hepburn: Sūpā Mario Burazāzu Wandā) is a 2023 platform game by Nintendo for the Nintendo Switch. It is the first side-scrolling Super Mario platform game since New Super Mario Bros. U (2012). The player controls one of several Mario characters as they attempt to stop Bowser, who plots to take over a new land known as the Flower Kingdom after using the magical Wonder Flower to fuse himself with the kingdom's castle.

Development for Super Mario Bros. Wonder began in 2019, with director Shiro Mouri taking inspiration from the original Super Mario Bros. and producer Takashi Tezuka seeking to reinvent the 2D Mario experience and introduce a new location. The game became the fastest-selling Super Mario game, selling over 17 million copies by 2026. It was nominated for several awards, including the Golden Joystick Award for Game of the Year, The Game Award for Game of the Year, and the British Academy Games Award for Best Game. A Nintendo Switch 2 version, Super Mario Bros. Wonder + Meetup in Bellabel Park, was released on March 26, 2026.

== Gameplay ==
Super Mario Bros. Wonder features dynamic level design, with interactive level objects that can move or alter behavior within gameplay.

Super Mario Bros. Wonder is a side-scrolling platform game. As one of twelve player characters—Mario, Luigi, Princess Peach, Princess Daisy, yellow and blue Toads, Toadette, Nabbit and four types of Yoshis—the player completes levels across the Flower Kingdom with assistance from its flower-like denizens. Two additional characters, Rosalina and Co-Star Luma, were added in the release of the Nintendo Switch 2 version. Luma can also be controlled using the Joy-Con 2's mouse controls. Similarly to previous Super Mario games, players guide their character to the end of a level while avoiding enemies, such as Goombas and Piranha Plants, and transporting through Warp Pipes. Each stage contains multiple collectible "Wonder Seeds".

New power-ups include a fruit that transforms the player into an elephant, a flower that allows the player to create bubbles that capture enemies, and a mushroom that gives the player a drill hat that allows them to burrow into the ground or ceiling to evade enemies or bypass obstacles. The Nintendo Switch 2 version also introduces a flower pot power-up that gives the player a plant suit, allowing them to shoot flower platforms upward; this can be used to defeat enemies or interact with other items.

Wonder introduces the Wonder Flower, which triggers effects such as pipes coming to life, hordes of enemies spawning, and character appearances and abilities changing. The effects end when a player collects a Wonder Seed or leaves the area of effect.

A new feature allows players to equip badges, which are unlocked throughout the game and give different advantages to the player. They are divided into three different categories: Action Badges, Boost Badges, and Expert badges which grant the player character an additional ability, passive ability; or an advanced skill respectively. Only one badge can be activated at a time per level. They are usually optional and can be shut off for higher difficulty.

The game supports local multiplayer for up to twelve players in a room with a limit of four players active in a level. It also has some online multiplayer functionality. When playing through a level while playing online, translucent versions of up to three other players playing through the same level may be present. When other online players are present nearby, defeated players become ghosts and are given a short window of time to revive themselves by flying toward another player or a standee placed by another player.

== Plot ==
Mario and his friends are invited to the neighboring Flower Kingdom by its ruler, Prince Florian, to see a demonstration of a Wonder Flower; great treasures of the Flower Kingdom that can warp reality. Bowser soon arrives to interrupt the ceremony and steal the Wonder Flower, using its power to merge with Prince Florian's castle, transfiguring himself into a sentient flying fortress and imprisoning the kingdom's citizens, the Poplins. Mario and his friends volunteer to help Florian stop Bowser and save the kingdom, prompting the prince to accompany the party. As the heroes work to save the captured citizens, they realize that by gathering six Royal Seeds, which are considered precious treasures in the Flower Kingdom, they will be led straight to Bowser, as each time a Royal Seed is collected, it destroys one of the six Cloud Piranhas protecting the transfigured Bowser.

After liberating the various regions of the kingdom and removing Bowser's defenses, Mario and company confront the villain as he reveals his endgame; using the Wonder Flowers' power to enslave the entire universe via a ritualistic rock concert. The heroes defeat Bowser, who returns to normal and retreats. The seventh Royal Seed is gained and, in tandem with the other six, restores the world.

== Development ==
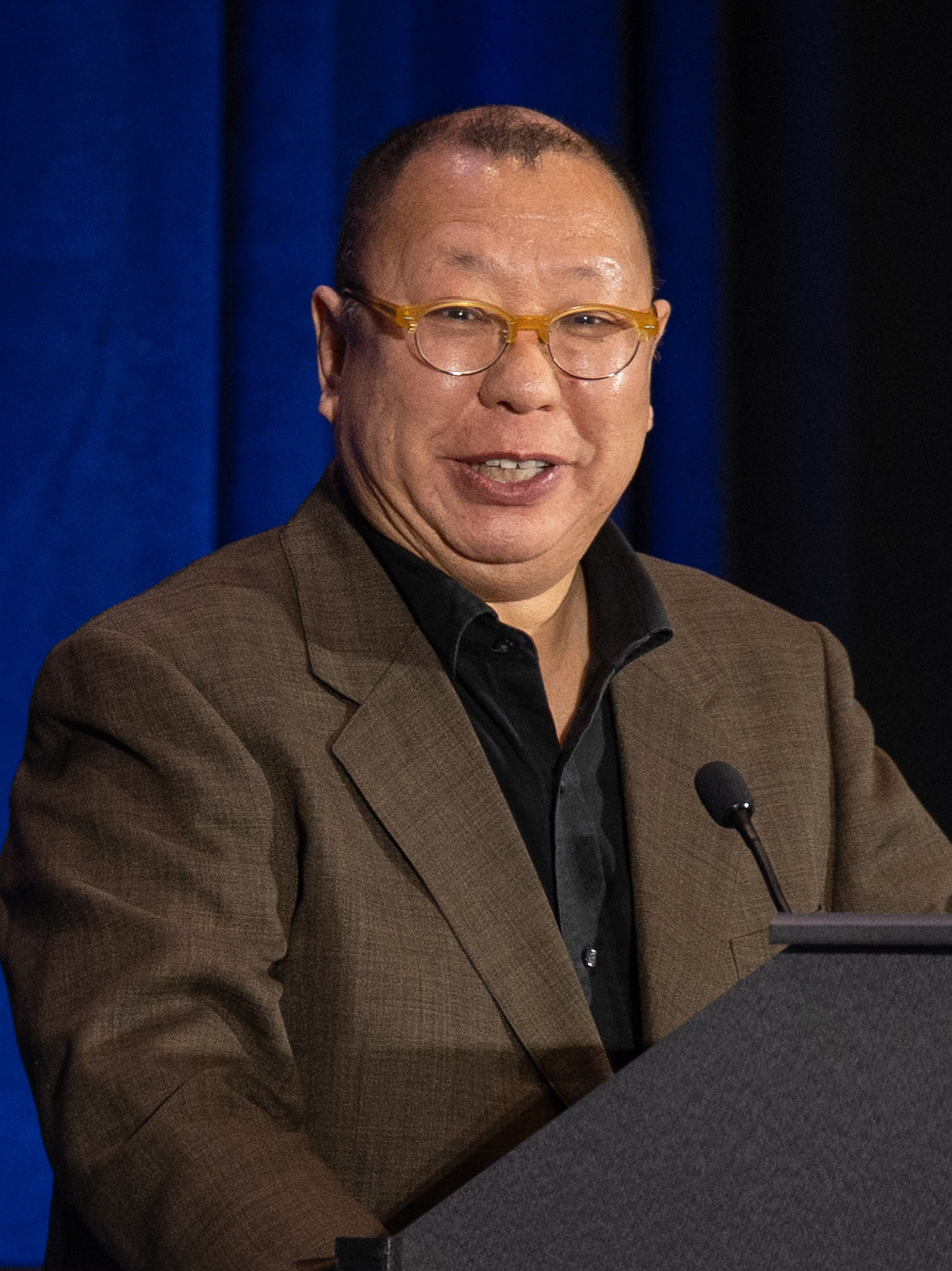
Takashi Tezuka (producer) in 2024

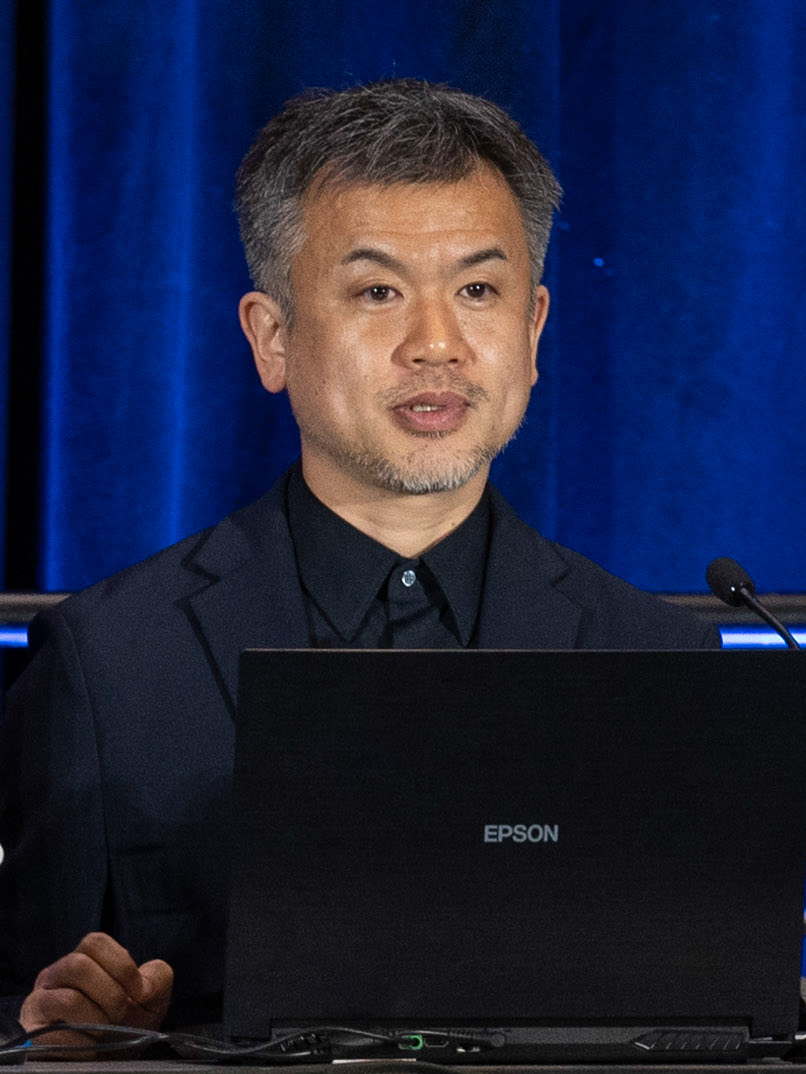
Shiro Mouri (director) in 2024

Super Mario developer and producer Takashi Tezuka returned as a producer for Wonder. Shiro Mouri, who previously directed New Super Mario Bros. U Deluxe, returned as director. Wonder started development in 2019 after the release of U Deluxe, and the development team was not given a deadline to produce a prototype, which resulted in extra time to develop gameplay ideas.

During the initial planning of Wonder, Mouri desired to recreate the sense of "secrets and mystery" that had been present in the original Super Mario Bros. for a modern audience. The director acknowledged how after Super Mario games had been enjoyed by players for many years, "those things have somehow become ordinary". The focus was placed on updating the traditional idea of transporting Mario to different areas of the level using Warp Pipes, vines, or other means. Tezuka suggested to instead change up the current physical location, leading to the creation of the Wonder Flower, which dramatically alters the current level. In order for all levels in the game to uniquely implement this item, approximately 2,000 ideas for Wonder effects were solicited from every member of the development team. The most viable were prototyped and implemented in the final game. Composer Koji Kondo pitched a concept where a Wonder effect would transform Mario into an anatomically realistic version of himself, and Mario would hum his own theme music and vocally shout out his own sound effects, such as saying "Boing!" when jumping. The idea was rejected, but Kondo would use his sound effects for the Sound Off? badge in the final game.

Tezuka acknowledged how some journalists and players claimed that Super Mario Maker, as a game creation system, "had eliminated the need" for another 2D Mario game and conceptualized the game keeping this in mind from the beginning as to make it "completely different from Super Mario Maker". The development team sought to create "a foundation for future 2D Mario games", like New Super Mario Bros. (2006) had created as the first 2D Mario game to use 3D elements, and wanted to develop "a significant evolution" like it was when it was released. For this, a completely new engine to serve as the base was developed and, in addition to using 3D models, the team wanted to implement more "engaging and functional ways of using 3D models possible with modern technology".

Additionally, to balance the gameplay between younger and experienced players, Wonder was designed to have a sliding difficulty scale, with badges that make the game easier or more challenging, an online mode where players can get assistance, characters with special abilities like immunity to enemy damage, and a non-sequential world map that allows players to optionally skip harder levels. While designing Badges, character specific abilities from prior games were separated from characters, in order to allow players to pick their favorite character and ability at will.

The game was planned to have a live sports commentary on the player's action. Late in development, this feature was superseded by the Talking Flowers, who exchange humorous quips with the player during levels, because—in the words of one game designer on the project—the sports commentary was too complex to implement and "something [didn't] feel right" about it. Director Mouri considered that the Talking Flowers were a version of live commentary that fits the world of Mario.

In regards to the online multiplayer component of the game, Mouri was conscious of how in competitive games "more-skilled players can have multiple wins and feel satisfied, while newcomers give up early because they keep losing" while in co-op games "those who aren't skilled at games can drag the team down", and wanted to provide "a casual connection" online gameplay experience "free from those sorts of worries" by creating a "live player shadows" system where players can only do beneficial things to each other and the game can be enjoyed similarly to single-player but with the addition of online interaction between players.

Shigeru Miyamoto, creator of the Mario franchise, had very little involvement in the development of Wonder. Despite this, as mentioned by Tezuka, Miyamoto gave feedback and suggestions to the developers when he occasionally visited to review the game's development progress. Mouri stated that Miyamoto once said that he disliked the original design and the animations for Mario's elephant form, which helped to modify both aspects for the final result.

== Release ==
Wonder was announced during a Nintendo Direct presentation on June 21, 2023, and was released on October 20, 2023, for the Nintendo Switch. It is the first 2D side-scrolling Super Mario game since New Super Mario Bros. U (2012). Wonder is the first game to feature Kevin Afghani as the new voice of Mario and Luigi, following the announcement of previous actor Charles Martinet's departure from the roles in August 2023. Sonic Superstars, a similar 2D side-scrolling platform game by Sega's Sonic Team, was released three days prior. Tezuka and Sonic Superstars producer Takashi Iizuka stated that this was a coincidence, despite how long it had been since either franchise had a 2D entry. It was the first time 2D Super Mario and Sonic the Hedgehog games had been released close to one another since the 1990s Nintendo–Sega console war.

During a Nintendo Direct presentation on September 12, 2025, an expanded version titled Super Mario Bros. Wonder: Nintendo Switch 2 Edition + Meetup in Bellabel Park was announced, for release on Nintendo Switch 2 in early 2026. This expanded edition includes a new Bellabel Park world with levels focusing on both competitive and cooperative multiplayer. The announcement also confirmed that recurring antagonists the Koopalings appear. The edition released on March 26, 2026.

The game sold 4.3 million units in its first two weeks of release and became the fastest-selling Super Mario game. By March 31, 2024, the game sold 13.44 million units. Wonder has sold 17.15 million copies as of March 31, 2026. It was the 12th best-selling video game in the United States in 2023.

== Reception ==
Reception

Aggregate scores
Aggregator	Score
Metacritic	NS: 92/100 (Note: Based on 130 reviews); NS2: 86/100 (Note: Based on 65 reviews)
OpenCritic	NS: 98% recommend (Note: Based on 147 reviews); NS2: 88% recommend (Note: Based on 49 reviews)

Review scores
Publication	Score
Destructoid	9/10
Digital Trends	4/5
Edge	9/10
Eurogamer	5/5
Famitsu	10/9/9/8 (Note: Each of the four reviewers in Famitsu scored the game on a 10-point scale.)
Game Informer	9.25/10
GameSpot	9/10
GamesRadar+	4.5/5
Hardcore Gamer	4.5/5
IGN	9/10
Nintendo Life	9/10
Nintendo World Report	9/10
Retro Gamer	97%
The Guardian	4/5
Video Games Chronicle	5/5
VG247	5/5

Super Mario Bros. Wonder received "universal acclaim" from critics on Nintendo Switch and "generally favorable" reviews on Nintendo Switch 2, according to review aggregator website Metacritic. On OpenCritic, 98% of critics recommended the game on Nintendo Switch and 88% of critics recommended the game on Nintendo Switch 2. Critics widely praised the gameplay, noting the creative innovations and variety brought to it. (Note: Attributed to multiple references:)

Critics praised the creative use of Wonder Flowers and their effects, keeping the level design and gameplay varied and unpredictable. IGN enjoyed how the Wonder effects changed the game's stages "in both surprising and delightful ways" while Eurogamer lauded the game's creativity as "an endless cascade of ideas" with "wonderfully strange places". GameSpot, however, noted that there was some "occasional repetition around some Wonder effects".

Nintendo World Report criticized the game's boss fights, stating that they were "mostly uncreative, especially the Airship endings where you are tasked with just touching a Switch at the end" and that each included "only minor variations to the environment and no changes to enemy attack patterns". They also were disappointed with the game's overall low difficulty level, stating that the difficulty curve stays "fairly low" and that Wonder sometimes feels "more like a roller coaster ride instead of a platforming challenge". Nonetheless, they opined that "even with these blemishes, at the end of the day Super Mario Bros. Wonder is an incredible breath of fresh air overall".

Edge echoed this, stating that while it hasn't been since the early 1990s that a 2D Mario game "felt quite so irrepressible.", they said the trade-off, with courses tended to be on the short side and the difficulty was verging on easy. They concluded that "these feel like a price worth paying for the sheer exuberance on show."

In terms of music and sound, Darran Jones of Retro Gamer said that they "could do without the new talking flower, but these are minor issues." GameSpot praised the badge system for giving "a degree of customization and lets you match your equipment to the task at hand" while Tom's Guide lauded how they "can completely transform how you play, offering new abilities, passive bonuses or useful effects before each level". The game's multiplayer functionality and its replay value was applauded, with Tom's Guide stating that "there's something here for both fans of the series and newcomers alike, with local and online multiplayer to keep you coming back after you've finished the main story" and Nintendo Life commending "local co-op and online fun adding to the replayability factor".

PJ O'Reilly of Nintendo Life considered the game "the best 2D Mario game since Super Mario World", with O'Reilly calling it "the slickest, sharpest, and smartest that two-dimensional Mario has felt since 1991 and in its Wonder Flowers, badges, and online aspects". Kirstin Swalley of Hardcore Gamer similarly stated that it was no exaggeration to call Wonder "one of the greatest Mario titles to come out in the last fifteen years, likely since New Super Mario Bros. DS itself" and praised it for being "so reminiscent of the much older titles, but also so full of the magic that modern inclusions can bring to the table". Digital Trends concluded that the game overall was both "a return to form and a delightful transformation of the classic 2D series".

The Nintendo Switch 2 edition, Meetup in Bellabel Park, was praised for addressing the original game's repetitive boss fights by introducing the Koopalings with different Wonder Flower transformations and for adding extra challenges to inject additional variety and difficulty, though its heavy focus on multiplayer-exclusive minigames was noted as a potential drawback for solo players.

=== Accolades ===
At the 24th Game Developers Choice Awards, Super Mario Bros. Wonder was recognized as an honorable mention in the categories of Game of the Year, Best Design, and Best Visual Art. In addition to its nominations at the 20th British Academy Games Awards, the game was longlisted for Artistic Achievement and Game Design.

Year	Award	Category	Result	Ref(s).
2023	Golden Joystick Awards	Ultimate Game of the Year	Nominated	
2023	The Game Awards 2023	Game of the Year	Nominated	
2023	The Game Awards 2023	Best Game Direction	Nominated	
2023	The Game Awards 2023	Best Art Direction	Nominated	
2023	The Game Awards 2023	Best Family Game	Won	
2023	The Game Awards 2023	Best Multiplayer Game	Nominated	
2024	13th New York Game Awards	Central Park Children's Zoo Award for Best Kids Game	Won	
2024	27th Annual D.I.C.E. Awards	Family Game of the Year	Won	
2024	27th Annual D.I.C.E. Awards	Outstanding Achievement in Game Direction	Nominated	
2024	27th Annual D.I.C.E. Awards	Outstanding Achievement in Game Design	Nominated	
2024	27th Annual D.I.C.E. Awards	Outstanding Achievement in Animation	Nominated	
2024	20th British Academy Games Awards	Best Game	Nominated	
2024	20th British Academy Games Awards	Animation	Nominated	
2024	20th British Academy Games Awards	Family	Won	
2024	20th British Academy Games Awards	Multiplayer	Won	
2024	2024 Kids' Choice Awards	Favorite Video Game	Nominated	
2024	Japan Game Awards 2024	Award for Excellence	Won	
2026	2026 Kids' Choice Awards	Favorite Video Game	Nominated	

== See also ==
- List of Nintendo Switch games
- List of platformers
- 2023 in video games
