= Electrek =

News website for electric transportation and sustainable energy

- Website type: News
- Available in: English
- Owner: Seth Weintraub
- Creators: Seth Weintraub and Fred Lambert
- Editor: Fred Lambert
- Revenue: Advertisement, optional subscription
- Website: electrek.co
- Commercial: Yes
- Registration: Optional
- Launched: September 17, 2012; 14 years ago
- Current status: Online

Electrek is an American news website dedicated to electric transportation and sustainable energy. As of 2018 Electrek was known for its extensive, positive coverage of electric transportation in general and Tesla specifically. Their positive coverage of Tesla has been criticized by some automotive journalists. Its main authors have disclosed ownership of Tesla stock, substantial profit from referrals to Tesla, and ownership of Tesla cars. The owner, Seth Weintraub, also disclosed near total divestment from Tesla stock on January 14, 2020.

== History ==
Founded in 2013 by Seth Weintraub in New York, the site is part of the 9to5 network. In 2015, Fred Lambert joined Electrek as a contributing writer, later having been promoted over the years and becoming editor-in-chief.
