= New Super Mario Bros. U =

2012 video game

- Packaging artwork
- Developer: Nintendo EAD (Note: Nintendo Switch version developed by Nintendo EPD. Nintendo Switch 2 upgrade developed by Panic Button.)
- Publisher: Nintendo
- Director: Masataka Takemoto
- Producers: Takashi Tezuka; Hiroyuki Kimura
- Designers: Shigeyuki Asuke; Daiki Iwamoto; Ryutaro Kanno
- Programmer: Shiro Mouri
- Artist: Masanobu Sato
- Composers: Shiho Fujii; Mahito Yokota
- Series: Super Mario
- Platforms: Wii U Nintendo Switch
- Release: Wii U: NA: November 18, 2012; PAL: November 30, 2012; JP: December 8, 2012; Nintendo Switch: WW: January 11, 2019; CHN: December 10, 2019
- Genre: Platform
- Modes: Single-player, multiplayer

New Super Mario Bros. U (Note: Japanese: New スーパーマリオブラザーズ U, Hepburn: Nyū Sūpā Mario Burazāzu Yū) is a 2012 platform game developed and published by Nintendo as a launch title for the Wii U. A sequel to New Super Mario Bros. Wii and the fourth and final entry in the New Super Mario Bros. series, following New Super Mario Bros. 2, it is the first Super Mario game to feature high-definition graphics. The plot follows Mario on his way to rescue Princess Peach and her castle from Bowser. The game retains the cooperative multiplayer mode from its prior entry.

Development of New Super Mario Bros. U started after the release of New Super Mario Bros. Wii, and the game was revealed at E3 2011. Takashi Tezuka explained that he created the game to take advantage of the Wii U, introducing the Boost mode and Miiverse integration.

The game received generally positive reviews from critics who praised its gameplay, graphics, and additions; but it was criticized for its unoriginality compared to prior titles and for having what some perceived as an uninteresting atmosphere. The game became the third best-selling Wii U game, and received an expansion pack named New Super Luigi U as part of the "Year of Luigi" campaign. A Nintendo Switch port named New Super Mario Bros. U Deluxe was released worldwide on January 11, 2019, followed by a release for China on December 10, 2019. As of March 2025, both versions combined have sold over 24 million copies.

== Gameplay ==
Mario uses a flying squirrel suit to glide. Three large star coin collectibles are located throughout each level.

New Super Mario Bros. U iterates on the gameplay of New Super Mario Bros. Wii with new features and levels. The objective of each level is to reach the goal flag at the end of each level while avoiding enemies and hazards. The game can be controlled either using Wii U Pro Controllers, Wii Remotes, or Off-TV Play using the Wii U GamePad, where the game can be played solely on the GamePad's screen. Four players each using a controller play as a different character, being Mario, Luigi, Yellow Toad, and Blue Toad. In the "Boost Mode" feature, a fifth player using the Wii U GamePad can interact with the environment, such as putting blocks down that can be stepped on or stunning enemies by holding down on them. Certain game modes also allow players to play their own custom Mii characters. Bowser, Boom Boom, the Koopalings, Kamek, and Bowser Jr., appear as the game's main villains. Nabbit is a new non-playable character who steals items from Red Toad and, when caught, rewards the player with items.

Along with returning elements such as Ice Flowers and Yoshis, the flying squirrel is a new power-up that allows players to glide across long distances or slowly descend down vertical paths and cling to the side of the walls. Additionally, Baby Yoshis are an item that can be carried by a player, with each baby Yoshi having a special ability dependent on its color, such as inflating in midair or illuminating dark areas. Some older power-ups also have new abilities. New Super Mario Bros. U features one large map containing all the game's worlds and levels, similar to that of Super Mario World. Some levels have multiple exits that lead to the different areas on the map.

Two new gameplay modes are "Challenge Mode" and "Boost Rush". Challenge Mode adds restrictions and conditions, such as clearing levels with a short timer. Boost Rush takes place on an automatically scrolling level which increases in speed as players collect coins, with the goal of clearing the stage as quickly as possible. "Coin Battle" from the prior entry also returns, with the player now being able to customize the battles with the GamePad to place the coins and Star Coins on the course. The Super Guide, which takes control of the player's character and moves it automatically through a level, is available in case the player has failed a level multiple consecutive times. The game originally utilized the now defunct Miiverse, which allowed players to share comments about particular levels with one another.

== Plot ==
Mario, Luigi, Yellow Toad, and Blue Toad, along with Princess Peach, are in the castle, having a tea party, when Peach is held captive in her castle by Bowser, Bowser Jr., and the Koopalings, who invade and use a giant mechanical arm to throw Mario, Luigi, Yellow Toad, and Blue Toad far away. Mario and his friends must move across this new land, returning to Peach's castle in order to save her. On the way, they encounter seven Koopalings, each controlling their own world, plus Kamek, Nabbit, and Bowser Jr., and many minor enemies like Goombas, and Koopas. By conquering them, they get closer to Peach's castle, which has been transformed into an evil reflection of Bowser. By stopping Bowser, the castle returns to normal. As the heroes celebrate, Bowser Jr. and the Koopalings attempt to escape, leaving Bowser behind. He manages to jump up onto the airship, but his weight causes it to crash, and they are forced to flee on Bowser Jr.'s Koopa Clown Car.

== Development ==
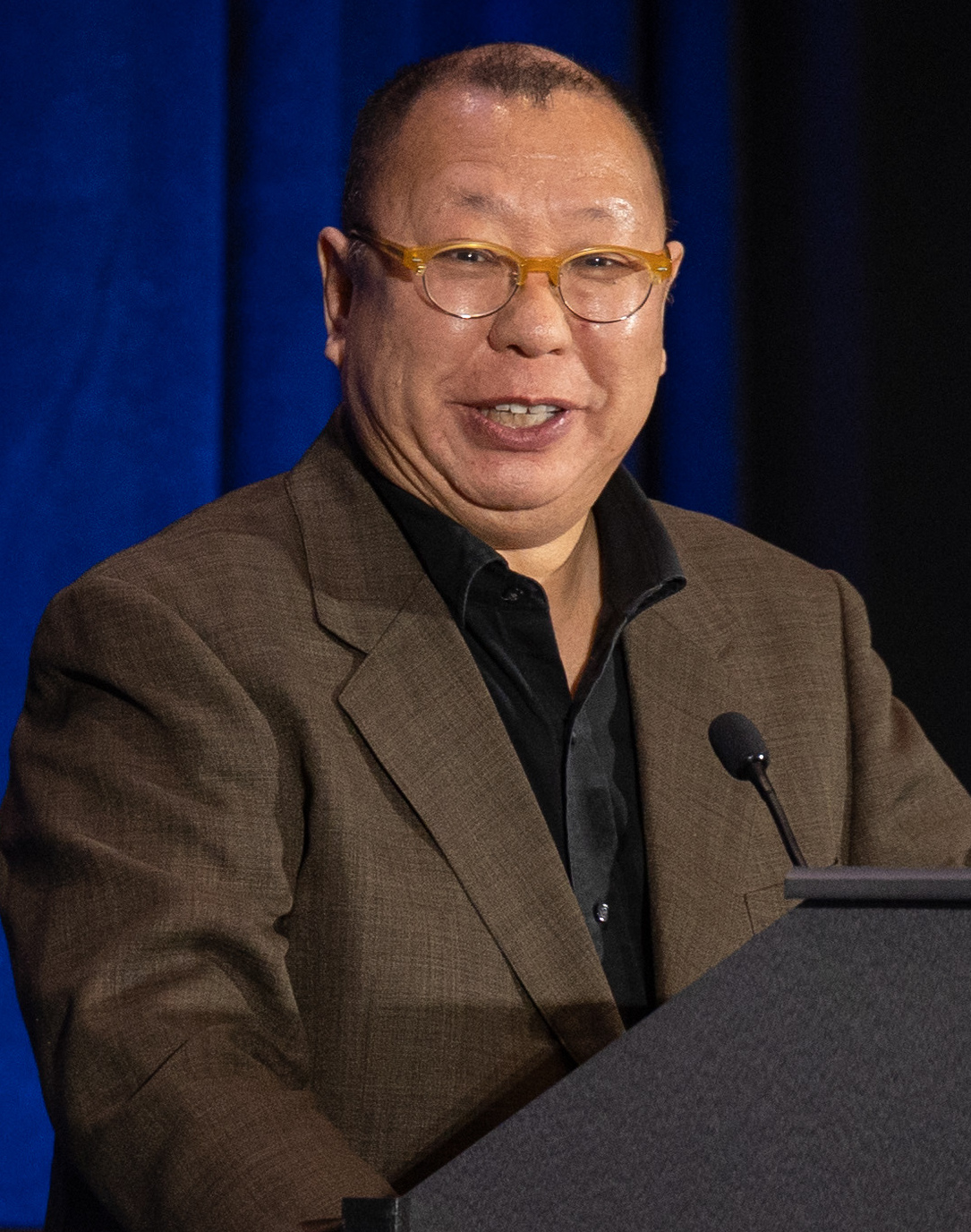
Producer Takashi Tezuka in 2024

Development of New Super Mario Bros. U started shortly after the release of New Super Mario Bros. Wii and spanned three years. The game, initially titled New Super Mario Bros. Mii, was first revealed at E3 2011 as one of several tech demos demonstrating the capabilities of Wii U. The demo's visual style duplicated New Super Mario Bros. Wii, but with high-definition graphics, and playable Mii characters alongside Mario and Luigi. Shigeru Miyamoto later announced that the Mario demo would be released as a full game for the system, and would be demonstrated in its revised form at E3 2012. There, the new game, New Super Mario Bros. U, was revealed as a launch game for the upcoming Wii U console.

Producer Takashi Tezuka explained he had created the game to take advantage of the Wii U hardware, focusing on the GamePad, for which Boost Mode was created. He explained that levels were created for single-player mode, without much thought of multiplayer during creation. He did not think too much about level design because he thought it would keep the players in a controlled experience, and decided to keep it more open. He was comfortable giving the player open access to placing blocks.

Creating new concepts, Tezuka created the flying squirrel suit to allow for open movement in the air. However, he kept it partially limited to keep the player from over-using it. The power-up glides horizontally to differ it from the propeller suit in New Super Mario Bros. Wii which can fly vertically. The developers used an open world map layout due to nostalgia for Super Mario World. Tezuka wanted a feature where players can interact worldwide, so Miiverse functionality was implemented. He added playable Mii characters to differentiate onscreen players, and HD graphics to help make each character more recognizable.

== Reception ==
=== Pre-release ===
Gameplay shown at E3 2011, when the game was still called New Super Mario Bros. Mii

Various media outlets tried the demo at E3 2011. GameSpot commented about the demo, stating that it was a fun experience, but the indistinguishable graphics from the Wii entry did not make the demo feel like a good showcase of Wii U capabilities. IGN stated that, different from other demos from the event, this demo felt "suspiciously well-choreographed and complete-feeling." In E3 2012, Nintendojo commented that the graphics had been improved since the past E3 showcase and that the new abilities added an extra layer of depth to the gameplay. Eurogamer highlighted that the game was not a technical workout for the Wii U, but it was sure to deliver artistic charm and essential playability. The Guardian stated that the game did not push the Wii U graphics, but the gamepad gameplay left you "satisfyingly God-like."

=== Release ===
New Super Mario Bros. U (and Deluxe)

Aggregate scores
Aggregator	Score	
Aggregator	NS	Wii U
Metacritic	80/100	84/100
OpenCritic	80% recommend	N/A

Review scores
Publication	Score	
Publication	NS	Wii U
1Up.com	N/A	B+
Destructoid	N/A	8.5/10
Edge	N/A	8/10
Eurogamer	N/A	9/10 (Recommended)
Famitsu	N/A	36/40
Game Informer	8.5/10	9.25/10
GameSpot	7/10	8.5/10
GamesRadar+	4.5/5	4/5
GameTrailers	N/A	8.4/10
Giant Bomb	N/A	3/5
Hardcore Gamer	N/A	4.5/5
Hyper	N/A	90/100
IGN	8/10	9.1/10
Nintendo Life	8/10	9/10
Nintendo Power	N/A	8/10
Nintendo World Report	8/10	9.5/10
Official Nintendo Magazine	N/A	86%
Polygon	Recommended	8.5/10
The Guardian	3/5	3/5
VideoGamer.com	N/A	8/10

New Super Mario Bros. U was positively received by critics, mostly for gameplay. GamesMaster magazine called it "a great excuse for families to gather round the TV, and an enticing glimpse of Mario's HD future". IGN stated that the game was "close to some of the greatest 2d Mario accomplishments", with a balanced level of difficulty, and a good challenge mode, but criticized its bland visuals and music. Game Informer considered it the best game in the New Super Mario Bros. series, saying it had "Some of the most creative NSMB levels Nintendo has created". Many critics liked the jump from regular graphics to HD, and enjoyed the visuals. GameSpot observed how "It's a challenging platformer, an excellent recreation of Mario's best moments, and it's the perfect way to kick-off Nintendo's journey into HD." Destructoid stated that however there isn't as much charm as past games, HD graphics was a key feature.

Giant Bomb was slightly more critical, noting "Everything about New Super Mario Bros. U is pretty exciting, except the game itself. Is it possible that this is the best game in the 'New' series to date—not to mention one of the best exclusive Wii U games on the market, by default—and at the same time kind of flatly uninteresting? Apparently so. The game is perfectly well made for what it is, and I had plenty of fun playing it in short bursts here and there, but at this point the series' by-the-numbers design philosophy is starting to lend the name 'New Super Mario Bros.' a degree of unintentional irony".

New Super Mario Bros. U Deluxe also received positive reviews, with a score of 80 on review aggregator website Metacritic. Fellow review aggregator OpenCritic assessed that the game received strong approval, being recommended by 80% of critics. Nintendo Life stated that the game was a solid package but that it was disappointing that it did not add a lot of content to make the game's "Deluxe" name worthy. GameSpot was a bit critical about the game, stating that although it was a good port, the formula started to feel old and that it had almost no bonus features for the owners of the Wii U game.

=== Sales ===
As of March 31, 2021, New Super Mario Bros. U has worldwide sales of 5.82 million units.

New Super Mario Bros. U Deluxe yielded sales of 455,006 physical copies within its first month in Japan, outperforming its Wii U counterpart. As of December 2019 more than 747,589 physical copies have been sold in Japan, and in January 2021, it was reported that Japanese sales figures had surpassed one million. Deluxe also debuted at the top of the charts in the United Kingdom, with 56% more units in its first week than when the Wii U version launched, and remained the UK's best-selling game in its second week on sale. As of March 31, 2025, 18.25 million copies of Deluxe have been sold worldwide, making it one of the best-selling games on the Nintendo Switch; both versions of the game have sold a combined total of 24.07 million copies.

=== Awards ===
Year	Award	Category	Recipients	Result
2012	Spike Video Game Awards	Best Wii/Wii U Game	Shigeru Miyamoto	Won
2012	Nintendo Life	Wii U Retail Game of 2012	N/A	Won
2012	Vooks.net	Game of the Year	N/A	Won
2012	IGN's Best of 2012	Best Wii U/Wii Game	N/A	Nominated
2012	IGN's Best of 2012	Best Wii U/Wii Multiplayer Game	N/A	Nominated
2013	16th Annual D.I.C.E. Awards	Adventure Game of the Year	Nintendo	Nominated

== Legacy ==
=== New Super Luigi U ===
To celebrate the Year of Luigi, Nintendo announced DLC known as New Super Luigi U on February 14, 2013. Though much of the content is reused from the base game, notable differences include Mario's absence and Luigi's role as the main character. Along with this, Luigi has his flutter jump from Super Mario Bros. 2 and the overall level design is more difficult when compared to the base game. The DLC was released along an update to the base game on June 20, 2013, and as a standalone disc on August 15, 2013. Later, a bundle known as New Super Mario Bros. U + New Super Luigi U was released on November 1, 2013, along with the Mario and Luigi U Wii U set. It was released as a standalone game on October 16, 2015.

=== New Super Mario Bros. U Deluxe ===
An enhanced port for the Nintendo Switch was announced in the Nintendo Direct on September 13, 2018, and released worldwide on January 11, 2019. Prior to its announcement, rumors of a Switch port had surfaced stating that the game will be remade and include the New Super Luigi U campaign, with a pending title of New Super Mario Bros. U Deluxe. The game was upgraded to native 1080p instead of 720p, and HD Rumble support throughout. Toadette and Nabbit are introduced as playable characters, with Toadette gaining access to a brand new power up called the Super Crown, turning into Peachette, and Nabbit now being playable in the original campaign instead of being exclusive to the New Super Luigi U DLC. Any character can be picked in single player, rather than Mario being the only playable option. Blue Toad was changed to be a color variation of Yellow Toad, both of which are now simply known as Toad. Boost Mode was also removed, along with its associated challenges in Challenge Mode.
