= Seth Weintraub =

American journalist and engineer

Seth Weintraub is an American journalist and engineer. Weintraub founded the 9to5 network of tech blogs: 9to5Mac, 9to5Google, 9to5Toys, DroneDJ, and Electrek.

== Education ==
In 1997, Weintraub earned a bachelor's degree in Industrial and systems engineering from the University of Southern California, with a minor in Multimedia and Creative Technologies. In 2002, he received a master's degree from New York University, Tisch Interactive Telecommunications Program in 2004. At that time, he was helping to manage the IT department at the NYU Medical School.

== 9to5 network ==
From 2006 to 2008, Weintraub lived in Paris. At the same time, he started blogging for Computerworld. In 2007, Weintraub created the 9to5Mac blog, where he wrote about Apple.

According to the editor of Computerworld Joyce Carpenter, Weintraub received Neal Awards in 2008 and 2009 for his coverage of Apple.

From 2009 to 2010, Seth Weintraub wrote for Fortune Magazine covering topics relevant to Google and continued contributing for Computerworld and The New York Times. In 2010, he launched 9to5Google about Google and 9to5Toys, a gear and deals site.

In 2013, he founded the news and commentary site Electrek, which analyzes news about the transition from fossil fuel to electric transport.
