= List of Captain N: The Game Master episodes =

This is a list of episodes for the series Captain N: The Game Master. While the Season 2 and Season 3 episodes were paired with episodes featuring the Super Mario Bros., the Captain N episodes themselves retained the title of Captain N: The Game Master. Season 3 episodes were half the time length of the previous seasons.

== Series overview ==
Season	Episodes	Originally released	
Season	Episodes	First released	Last released
1	13	September 9, 1989	December 2, 1989
2	14	September 8, 1990	January 5, 1991
3	7	September 14, 1991	October 26, 1991

== Episodes ==
=== Season 1 (1989) ===
No. overall	No. in season	Title	Written by	Original release date	Prod. code
1	1	"Kevin in Videoland"	Jeffrey Scott	September 9, 1989	101
Kevin Keene is sucked into Videoland through his television and must team up with the rest of the N Team to rescue Lana from Mother Brain. Featured songs: "The Good, the Bad, and the Ugly" by Ennio Morricone and "Shakedown" by Bob Seger Game elements: Donkey Kong and Metroid
2	2	"How's Bayou"	Jeffrey Scott	September 16, 1989	102
Mother Brain discovers Kevin isn't very good at the Bayou Billy video game, and sets a trap to lure him into Bayouland. Featured song: "Born on the Bayou" by Creedence Clearwater Revival Game elements: The Adventures of Bayou Billy Note: The original airing of this episode was of an unfinished version which included some shots missing their backgrounds.
3	3	"The Most Dangerous Game Master"	Jeffrey Scott	September 23, 1989	103
Dr. Wily builds an android replica of Mike Vincent, a bully that tormented Kevin on Earth and lures the N Team to Castlevania in order to trap them. Featured song: "Thriller" by Michael Jackson Game elements: Castlevania, and Castlevania II: Simon's Quest
4	4	"Videolympics"	Jeffrey Scott	September 30, 1989	104
Mother Brain proposes a challenge – Video Olympics on Mount Icarus, with her League of Darkness competing against the N Team. The winner takes the throne of Videoland. This serves to distract the N Team as Mother Brain wants to get the Three Sacred Treasures and conquer Videoland. Featured song: "I Got You (I Feel Good)" by James Brown Game elements: Donkey Kong, Mike Tyson's Punch-Out!!, Mega Man, and Kid Icarus
5	5	"Mega Trouble for Megaland"	Jeffrey Scott	October 7, 1989	105
The continuation of the two-parter started with "Videolympics". The N Team try to find weapons powerful enough to defeat the magic of the Sacred Treasures. Featured song: "Danger Zone" by Kenny Loggins Game elements: Kid Icarus and Mega Man
6	6	"Wishful Thinking"	Jeffrey Scott	October 14, 1989	106
The N Team discovers a magic lamp, so Pit wishes himself to become bigger, but everything goes horribly wrong. To make matters worse, Mother Brain has set her sights on getting it for herself and sends Eggplant Wizard and King Hippo to steal it. Featured song: "Shakedown" by Bob Seger
7	7	"Three Men and a Dragon"	Jeffrey Scott	October 21, 1989	107
Kevin and the N Team journey to Dragon's Den to battle with Mother Brain and her new ally, Dragonlord, who is in the process of conquering that video world. Featured song: "Isn't She Lovely" by Stevie Wonder Game elements: Dragon Warrior
8	8	"Mr. and Mrs. Mother Brain"	Jeffrey Scott	October 28, 1989	108
Due to a "curse" from one of the arrows used by Pit, Simon Belmont falls in love with Mother Brain. Featured song: "White Wedding" by Billy Idol Game elements: Castlevania II: Simon's Quest and Kid Icarus
9	9	"Nightmare on Mother Brain's Street"	Jeffrey Scott	November 4, 1989	109
Mother Brain and Dr. Wily plot to trap the N Team in the Nightmare Zone, a world where their worst nightmares become reality. Featured song: "Bonanza" by Jay Livingston and Ray Evans Game elements: Wizards & Warriors
10	10	"Simon the Ape-Man"	Jeffrey Scott	November 11, 1989	110
Simon suffers a blow to the head and thinks he's Donkey Kong Jr.. Game elements: Donkey Kong and Castlevania
11	11	"In Search of the King"	Jeffrey Scott	November 18, 1989	111
Lana and the N Team go to the Mirror World to attempt to rescue her father, unaware that they are falling into a trap. Featured song: "Dancing with Myself" by Generation X Game elements: Wizards & Warriors and Castlevania II: Simon's Quest
12	12	"Metroid Sweet Metroid"	Jeffrey Scott	November 25, 1989	112
Mother Brain tricks the N Team into thinking she is defeated and uses the distraction of the N Team's "victory" to conquer Videoland. Game elements: Metroid
13	13	"Happy Birthday, Megaman"	Jeffrey Scott	December 2, 1989	113
It is Mega Man's birthday and he's upset about not being a human, so he sets out on a quest to gain to become one. Featured songs: "Danger Zone" by Kenny Loggins and "Shake It Up" by The Cars

=== Season 2 (1990–1991) ===
For season 2, the show aired in an hour-long block in between two episodes of The Adventures of Super Mario Bros. 3.

No. overall	No. in season	Title	Written by	Original release date	Prod. code
14	1	"Gameboy"	Dorothy Middleton	September 8, 1990	201
The N Team finally gains contact with King Charles again, wanting to help him escape the Mirror World through a warp that only opens every thousand video years, but he sends a supercomputer called Game Boy in his place instead. Game Boy ends up being more trouble than good for the N Team, and things get worse when Mother Brain plans to capture him and use his computer power for evil. Game elements: BurgerTime and Metroid
15	2	"Queen of the Apes"	David Ehrman and Sean Roche	September 15, 1990	202
Mother Brain plots to switch bodies with Lana, only to have Donkey Kong and Gameboy interfere. Their brains are switched, with Donkey Kong in Gameboy's body and Gameboy in Mother Brain's body. While this poses problems for the N-Team, their worst problem is a gigantic, powerful Mother Brain, who is now in Donkey Kong's body. Although angered at her two lackeys for what they've done, she decides to take advantage of her newfound body to take over Kongoland. Game elements: Donkey Kong
16	3	"Quest for the Potion of Power"	Rick Merwin	September 22, 1990	203
Kevin meets Link and Princess Zelda for the first time, and sets out with them on a journey through Hyrule to stop the evil wizard Ganon from being restored to his full power. Game elements: Zelda II: The Adventure of Link
17	4	"The Trouble with Tetris"	Michael Maurer	September 29, 1990	204
Lana reunites with her long-lost brother Lyle on the distant video world of Tetris, and Kevin and Lyle work together to stop Mother Brain from taking Tetris's power source, the Sacred Square. Game elements: Tetris
18	5	"The Big Game"	Dennis O'Flaherty	October 6, 1990	205
Some of Kevin's high school friends are warped to Videoland for a football game against Dr. Wily's Robot Masters. The winner takes the throne of Videoland. Game elements: Mega Man 2 and California Games
19	6	"The Lost City of Kongoland"	Dennis O'Flaherty	October 13, 1990	206
The N Team travels to Kongoland to stop Mother Brain from getting a priceless artifact, but when Lana crosses paths with the artifact, she becomes an even deadlier foe than Mother Brain. Game elements: Donkey Kong Jr.
20	7	"Once Upon a Time Machine"	Matt Uitz and Michael Maurer	October 20, 1990	207
Count Gruemon steals Kevin's Power Pad and Zapper in Hyrule, so he and Link set out into the world of Puss 'n Boots to get them back, along with the help of Pero the cat. Game elements: Zelda II: The Adventures of Link and Puss 'n Boots: Pero's Great Adventure
21	8	"The Feud of Faxanadu"	Michael Maurer	October 27, 1990	208
A power overload in the Palace of Power's football arena warps the N Team to Faxanadu – where they find themselves amidst a conflict between elves and dwarves – and an evil being bent on getting a powerful crystal that will let him conquer the video world. Game elements: Faxanadu
22	9	"Having a Ball"	Dennis O'Flaherty	November 3, 1990	209
Mother Brain fires Eggplant Wizard and King Hippo for failing to capture the Triforce, so they steal the Triforce pieces for themselves while Link and Zelda are away at Lana's royal ball. Game elements: Zelda II: The Adventures of Link
23	10	"The Trojan Dragon"	Matt Uitz	November 10, 1990	210
Dragonlord is back and his new plan for conquering Dragon's Den involves hatching a deadly golden dragon. Zelda and Link once again help the N Team by building a mechanical dragon to help sneak in and thwart Dragonlord's plan. Game elements: Dragon Warrior and Zelda II: The Adventures of Link
24	11	"I Wish I Was a Wombatman"	David Ehrman and Sean Roche	November 17, 1990	211
Pit must help his television hero deal with Mother Brain, but finds his TV hero may not be all he thought he was. Game elements: Marble Madness, with the characters of Wombatman and his girlfriend Nikki being parodies of Batman and Vicki Vale
25	12	"The Invasion of the Paper Pedalers"	Michael Maurer	November 24, 1990	212
The N Team takes a trip to an Earth-like world where Mother Brain is hypnotizing residents with a special kind of newspaper ink. They meet a paperboy named Julio who is trying to figure out the reason behind this, but they then discover why he is immune to the hypnotic ink as Julio is illiterate. Game elements: Paperboy
26	13	"Germ Wars"	Greg Klein and Ted Alben	December 1, 1990	213
Kevin contracts a video virus he has no immunity to, so the N Team shrinks themselves down and goes inside Kevin's body to battle the virus. Game elements: Faxanadu, also inspired by Fantastic Voyage, Innerspace and possibly the Disney theme park ride Body Wars
27	14	"When Mother Brain Rules"	Unknown	January 5, 1991	214
A clip show of assorted moments from the first two seasons. Two versions of this episode were produced. The clips in "Version 1", which aired on NBC, had background music but no voices, and sparse narration by a generic narrator. "Version 2", which aired on WGN (and presumably on USA Network) had the voices restored, different background music (using the soundtrack from Season 2), and more narration provided by Simon Belmont. Neither version has officially been released on home media. Featured song: "The Good, the Bad, and the Ugly" by Ennio Morricone

=== Season 3 (1991) ===
The series was reduced to 11 minutes, as it shared a half-hour timeslot with Super Mario World. 7 were new, while 6 were reruns. In order to fill up the other 6 timeslots, 5 episodes from the first two seasons were edited down to 11 minutes. They were "Nightmare on Mother Brain's Street" (November 2, 1991), "Mr. and Mrs. Mother Brain" (November 9, 1991), "Three Men and a Dragon" (November 16, 1991), "Quest for the Potion of Power" (no footage was cut, but it was split into two 11-minute parts, with the first part airing on November 23, 1991 and the second on November 30, 1991), and "The Invasion of the Paper Pedalers" (December 7, 1991).

No. overall	No. in season	Title	Written by	Original release date	Prod. code
28	1	"Misadventures in Robin Hood Woods"	Dorothy Middleton	September 14, 1991	402
After returning from a Dragon's Den mission, Kevin and Pit do battle with the Sheriff of Nottingham's soldiers and team up with Robin Hood. Game elements: Robin Hood: Prince of Thieves (game based on the 1991 film of the same name)
29	2	"Pursuit of the Magic Hoop"	Matt Uitz	September 21, 1991	401
The N Team travels to Hoopland for Hoop-Dee-Doo-Dah Day where they can gain a wish by sinking a shot through the Magic Hoop. Kevin and Lana have their hopes set on bringing King Charles home, but end up having to fix a wish gone awry causing Kevin and Lana to help him by heading to the top of Hoop Mountain and they even encounter Clockman. Larry Bird makes an appearance, but only in character and name. Game elements: Jordan vs Bird: One on One
30	3	"Return to Castlevania"	Matt Uitz	September 28, 1991	403
Simon travels to his homeworld of Castlevania to be honored by the Poltergeist King, but is made to think he had dishonored his great-grandfather Trevor Belmont, but the King isn't really who he appears to be. Game elements: Castlevania III: Dracula's Curse
31	4	"Totally Tetrisized"	Dorothy Middleton	October 5, 1991	404
A new foe, the Puzzle Wizard, has taken over the world of Tetris, so the N Team goes to set things straight, dealing with the Wizard's puzzling shenanigans. Game elements: Tetris
32	5	"A Tale of Two Dogs"	Dennis O'Flaherty	October 12, 1991	407
Dr. Wily, Dr. Wright and the N Team build a Peace Robot, but Wily double-crosses them. He tries to use the robot to take over Videoland after kidnapping Duke and Rush to keep Kevin and Megaman occupied. Game elements: Mega Man 3
33	6	"Battle of the Baseball Know-It-Alls"	Calvin Kelley	October 19, 1991	405
Mother Brain has returned in a last-ditch effort to conquer the Palace of Power, while the N Team deals with other demons under the stadium in the world of Baseball. Bo Jackson appears via character and name. Game elements: Bo Jackson Baseball Note: This segment has not been released on DVD since the Captain N and the New Super Mario World box set in 2007, likely due to licensing rights issues, but is available to watch on Paramount+ and YouTube.
34	7	"The Fractured Fantasy of Captain N"	Paul Dell and Steven Weiss	October 26, 1991	406
Kevin is hypnotized into doing evil by a dark prince named Astos who hopes to conquer the world of Final Fantasy. Game elements: Final Fantasy
