= Hades (disambiguation) =

Hades in the ancient Greek religion and myth, is the god of the dead and the king of the underworld, with which his name became synonymous.

Hades may also refer to:

== Arts and entertainment ==
=== Fictional entities ===
- Hades (DC Comics)
- Hades (Marvel Comics)
- Hades (Disney)
- Hades (Saint Seiya)
- Hades (Kid Icarus)
- Gray Waste, or Hades, a plane of existence in Dungeons and Dragons

=== Music ===
- Hades (band), American speed/power metal band
- Hades Almighty, originally Hades, a Norwegian black metal band
- Hades (album), an album by Melanie Martinez
- Hades (single album), by VIXX, 2016
- "Hades", a song by Crystal Lake from the 2015 album The Sign
- "Hades", a song by Kalmah from the 2000 album Swamplord
- "Hades", a song by Turmion Kätilöt from the 2008 album U.S.C.H!
- "Hades", a song by Bushido, 2018
- Hades: The Other World, a 2014 album by Yōsei Teikoku

=== Film and television ===
- Hades (film), a 1995 German drama film
- Escape Plan 2: Hades, 2018 American film

=== Video games ===
- Hades (video game), a 2020 video game by Supergiant Games
  - Hades II, a 2025 video game by Supergiant Games, the sequel to the above

=== Other ===
- "Hades" (Ulysses episode), in James Joyce's novel

== Other uses ==
- Hadès, a French nuclear ballistic missile system
- HADES (aircraft): 'High Accuracy Detection and Exploitation System', US army intelligence, surveillance and reconnaissance aircraft.
- Hades (horse), a New Zealand Thoroughbred racehorse
- Hades (imprint), an imprint of the former publisher Verlag Harri Deutsch
- Hades (moon), a 1955–1975 informal name for Jupiter IX, now called Sinope
- HADES (software), a signal processing system
- Hades Publications, a Canadian science fiction and fantasy publisher
- Arch Hades (born 1992), a British poet
- Lena Hades (born 1959), a Russian artist

== See also ==
- Hade (disambiguation)
- Hades in popular culture
- Christian views on Hades
