= Captain N: The Game Master =

American animated television series

- Genre: Action; Adventure; Comedy; Science fantasy
- Based on: Characters by Nintendo
- Directed by: Michael Maliani (Season 1); Chuck Patton (Season 2); John Grusd (Season 3); Kit Hudson (live-action sequences)
- Voices of: Garry Chalk; Ian James Corlett; Michael Donovan; Matt Hill; Alessandro Juliani; Andrew Kavadas; Doug Parker; Levi Stubbs; Venus Terzo; Frank Welker; Tomm Wright
- Narrated by: Doc Harris
- Composers: Haim Saban (Season 1); Shuki Levy (Season 1); Michael Tavera (Season 2–3)
- Country of origin: United States
- Original language: English
- No. of seasons: 3
- No. of episodes: 34 (list of episodes)

Production
- Executive producer: Andy Heyward
- Producers: Michael Maliani (Season 1); John Grusd (Season 3)
- Editors: Lars Floden (Season 1); William P. Magee (Season 1); Warren Taylor (Season 2); Mark A. McNally (Season 2–3); Susan Odjakjian (Season 2–3); Mel Ashkenas (Season 3); Jill Goularte (Season 3)
- Running time: 22 minutes (Season 1–2); 11 minutes (Season 3)
- Production companies: DIC Animation City; Saban Productions (Season 1 only); Nintendo of America

Original release
- Network: NBC
- Release: September 9, 1989 – October 26, 1991

Captain N: The Game Master is an American animated television series that aired on NBC from 1989 to 1991 as part of its Saturday-morning cartoon lineup. Produced by DIC Animation City, it incorporated elements from video games of the time by Japanese company Nintendo. There was also a comic book adaptation by Valiant Comics.

The series was also part of an hour-long block with The Adventures of Super Mario Bros. 3 in Season 2 and a half-hour block with Super Mario World in Season 3.

== Premise ==
Kevin Keene, a teenager from the Northridge neighborhood of Los Angeles, and his dog Duke are transported to the world of Videoland after being sucked into the Ultimate Warp Zone, a vortex that formed in his television.

To fulfill an ancient prophecy, Kevin is destined to become the hero Captain N and save Videoland from Mother Brain and her forces, who operate from the floating world/fortress of Metroid. When Kevin and Duke arrive in Videoland, Mother Brain has nearly succeeded in capturing the Palace of Power and conquering Videoland. They appear before the N Team, consisting of Princess Lana, the acting ruler of Videoland in the absence of her father, the King, Simon Belmont, Mega Man, and Kid Icarus, who are not confident in Kevin's abilities. When Lana is kidnapped by the enemy shortly after Kevin's arrival, they put aside their differences to rescue her, during which he proves himself to them. In Season 2, Game Boy, a human-sized supercomputer, joins the N Team.

In most episodes, the N Team's enemy is a group of video game villains, usually led by the boisterous and loud Mother Brain and her minions, the Eggplant Wizard from Kid Icarus, the thuggish King Hippo from Punch-Out!!, and the scheming Dr. Wily from Mega Man. In episodes set in a particular video game, the villain is instead a "villain of the week", such as Malkil of Wizards & Warriors. Other characters make recurring appearances, including Donkey Kong, The Count from Castlevania, and Dr. Light from Mega Man. The cast of the Legend of Zelda cartoon reprise their respective roles for several guest appearances throughout the series.

The show is primarily an action-adventure derived from the featured video games, with comic relief derived from the characters' interactions, quirks, and catchphrases, as well as the various worlds and their loose interpretations of the laws of reality that apply in Videoland.

== Characters ==
=== The N Team ===
- Kevin Keene (portrayed by Dorian Barag in live-action sequences, voiced by Matt Hill in animated sequences): The titular protagonist of the series, who arrived in Videoland through the Ultimate Warp Zone and is destined to save it from Mother Brain. Upon arriving in Videoland, he is a reluctant hero and is often at odds with the rest of the N Team. He wears a varsity jacket with a varsity letter "N" and is armed with a belt and holster containing a Power Pad, a device shaped like a NES controller that can stop time, allow him to leap over objects, or give him super speed over short distances. He also wields a gun resembling a NES Zapper gun that "de-digitalizes" enemies and can shoot ice shaped like Tetris blocks. His use of these tools, along with his friendly, yet competitive, demeanor eventually earns the trust of the team, who address him as Captain N, though Princess Lana addresses him by his first name. In most episodes, he plays a big-brother role to characters as he helps them with their problems.
- Duke (voiced by Tomm Wright): Kevin's dog, who jumped into the Ultimate Warp Zone after Kevin was sucked in and ended up in Videoland, serving as his companion. Though intelligent, he is prone to canine behavior. In the live-action sequences, Duke is shown to be a Golden Retriever, though in the animated sequences appears to be a beagle.
- Princess Lana (voiced by Venus Terzo): The current regent of Videoland after Mother Brain banished her father, King Charles, to the Mirror World, who rules over the worlds of Videoland from the Palace of Power. Though kind, she accompanies the N Team in their adventures, serving as a mediator between them, and is not afraid of conflict, having been trained to defend herself from a young age. Both Kevin and Simon compete for her affections, but she seems to prefer Kevin over Simon, as she kisses him on several occasions.
- Simon Belmont from Castlevania (voiced by Andrew Kavadas): An arrogant and vain vampire hunter from Castlevania, who, until Kevin's arrival, regarded himself as Princess Lana's highest-ranking servant. He enjoys courting and complimenting Princess Lana, openly declaring his romantic interest in her despite her rejections, and taking care of his appearance and physique. Despite this and his competitive nature, as he sees Captain N as a rival for Princess Lana's attention, he cares for the members of the N Team. He wields a whip that can de-digitalize enemies and carries a backpack with a seemingly endless capacity of items. His appearance was partially based upon his voice actor, Andrew Kavadas.
- Kid Icarus from Kid Icarus (voiced by Alessandro Juliani): A diminutive angel from Mount Icarus who is loyal to and protective of Princess Lana, and courageous despite his small stature and childlike nature. He is the only member of the team who can fly, and his quiver contains regular arrows that can de-digitalize enemies, as well as various specialized gadget arrows. He often ends words with the suffix "-icus". His appearance in season 3 is similar to his sprite and box art from Kid Icarus: Of Myths and Monsters.
- Mega Man from Mega Man (voiced by Doug Parker): A robot, who, along with his creator Dr. Wright, is from Megaland and is protective of Princess Lana. Despite his size, he is strong, durable, and agile, and wields two forearm-mounted energy blasters that function like Captain N's Zapper. He occasionally begins his words with the prefix "mega-". He is upset with the fact he is a nonliving robot and becomes human, but still possesses his robotic abilities.
- Game Boy (voiced by Frank Welker): A human-sized supercomputer sent by King Charles in his place to help Captain N when the portal to Mirror World opens. Despite describing himself as being "programmed to play games", he is capable of rising to the challenge when needed. He can extend his arms and hands from his casing and use his display to materialize things, including objects and monsters, and has an onboard computer that can analyze substances and track enemies.

=== Main villains ===
- Mother Brain from Metroid (voiced by Levi Stubbs): The main antagonist of the series, she is a power-hungry and vain brain-like alien in a giant glass tank who comes from Metroid, from which she and her forces operate, and uses a "computer mind mirror" to spy on the N Team and find weaknesses to exploit. By the beginning of the series, she and her troops attack the Palace of Power and she has banished King Charles to the Mirror World on Excalibur. Though proud of her form and presence, she is not above using subterfuge to achieve her goals. She has retractable prehensile tentacles she uses to attack or to electrically shock her minions to encourage them to do better.
- Eggplant Wizard from Kid Icarus (voiced by Michael Donovan): A one-eyed human-sized eggplant from Mount Icarus and the main enemy of Kid Icarus, who is often the target of Mother Brain's abuse due to his incompetence and has the ability to conjure vegetable-themed gadgets. He is a foil to King Hippo, as they usually appear together. Unlike King Hippo, Eggplant Wizard can take the initiative with his schemes and is not above turning against Mother Brain.
- King Hippo from Punch-Out!! (voiced by Garry Chalk): A heavyweight boxer from Punch-Out, he prefers brawn over brains and is cruel, with most of his ire directed towards his counterpart, the Eggplant Wizard.
- Doctor Wily from Mega Man (voiced by Ian James Corlett): A mad scientist from Megaland who is loyal to Mother Brain and among the most competent of her main henchmen. He uses his genius to build gadgets as part of his schemes to defeat the N Team, such as using a mind-reading device to learn their greatest fears and sending his Robot Masters to attack.

=== Minor villains ===
- Donkey Kong from Donkey Kong (voiced by Garry Chalk): A giant gorilla from Kongoland, who is quick to anger and must be appeased with food. Except for the Videolympics, where he joins Mother Brain's team, he is independent and solitary, not wanting visitors in his jungle.
- The Count from Castlevania (voiced by Garry Chalk): A vampire from Castlevania, who can control the undead and transform into a bat. Except for the Videolympics, where he joins Mother Brain's team, he works alone.
- Alucard (voiced by Ian James Corlett): The Count's son, a rebellious teenager.
- Dragonlord from Dragon Warrior (voiced by Don Brown): A giant red dragon from Dragon's Den, who seeks to rule over it and its inhabitants. Though intelligent, he is somewhat gullible.
- Ganon from The Legend of Zelda (voiced by Len Carlson): A pig-like warlock and Link and Zelda's greatest foe, who seeks to conquer Hyrule. After Link recently defeated him, he lost most of his power until drinking a potion of power that King Hippo and Eggplant Wizard gave him.
  - Rebonack from Zelda II: The Adventure of Link: A silver armored knight who serves Ganon, he rides a mechanical horse and wields a lance.
- Malkil from Wizards & Warriors (voiced by Garry Chalk): An evil, gnome-like wizard from Excalibur, who also appears as one of the primary villains in The Power Team.
- Medusa from Kid Icarus (voiced by Venus Terzo): A gorgon and the Goddess of Darkness, who comes from Mount Icarus and can turn others to stone with her gaze. She tries to use her beautiful voice to trick people into looking at her.

=== Other characters ===
- King Charles (voiced by Long John Baldry): The original monarch of Videoland and Lana and Lyle's father, who is kind and compassionate, putting the needs of others before his own. Prior to the events of the series, Mother Brain captured and banished him to the Mirror World, though he sends Game Boy to aid the N Team when the portal opens.
- Prince Lyle: Princess Lana's brother, who left home after feeling out of place and came to live in the world of Tetris, where he guards the Sacred Square. Despite his lineage, he displays few leadership skills or heroism and considers himself to be clumsy despite his good intentions. Lana and the N Team help to convince him to believe in himself and that people will have confidence in him as a leader.
- Princess Zelda from The Legend of Zelda (voiced by Cynthia Preston): The ruler of Hyrule and protector of the Triforce, who aids the N Team and is a friend of Princess Lana, having known her before Mother Brain attacked Videoland.
- Link from The Legend of Zelda (voiced by Jonathan Potts): A young and heroic warrior who serves Zelda and protects the Triforce and Hyrule alongside her. He is Kevin's idol and favorite video game character. Though friction develops between them when Zelda compliments Kevin on his skills and intelligence, causing Link to be jealous of and resent him, they reconcile after working together to defeat Ganon. Unlike his appearance in the Legend of Zelda cartoon, Link is older and portrayed as being more mature, as he is no longer obsessed with trying to steal a kiss from Zelda.
- Wombatman: A cynical anthropomorphic wombat and parody of Batman, who portrays the titular character in a TV series filmed at the Marblopolis Studio World. Kid Icarus idolizes him because they both use various gadgets, but is distraught to learn that he does not perform his own stunts. When his girlfriend Nikki is held captive, Wombatman reluctantly helps Mother Brain capture the N Team before Kid Icarus convinces him to aid the N Team, after which he decides to do his own stunts.
- Mayor Squaresly (voiced by Garry Chalk): The mayor of Tetris, who loves holidays and enlists the N Team in stopping the Puzzle Wizard, who is turning Tetris' citizens into Tetris blocks.
- Bayou Billy West from The Adventures of Bayou Billy (voiced by Garry Chalk): The titular character from the video game, which Kevin was unable to beat. He has a pet alligator Loafer for a pet and rides in a buggy-like vehicle. Bayou Billy helps Captain N find Duke while training him in the ways of bayou tracking, which help him fight Doctor Wily's swamp creature.
- Prince Plenty: The monarch of Kongoland, who invented a machine that feeds Donkey Kong fruit and keeps him away from the city.
- Doctor Wright (voiced by Antony Holland): A genius scientist from Megaland who built Mega Man (to whom he serves as a father figure) and Mega Girl and helps the N Team fight Dr. Wily and Mother Brain. He is the Captain N incarnation of Doctor Light.
- Mega Girl (voiced by Lelani Marrell): A female robot who resembles Mega Man, but with pink and white armor. Though she wants to be friends with him, she is initially turned away as she reminds him that he is not human. She is the Captain N incarnation of Roll.

== Featured video games ==
Captain N: The Game Master takes place in Videoland, consisting of worlds based on various video games. In some cases, such as with Wizards & Warriors, Dragon Warrior, and Metroid, areas and elements from the game were used, but the protagonist did not appear. The following video games appeared at least once during the series:

- The Adventures of Bayou Billy – Bayouland.
- Bo Jackson Baseball – Baseball World.
- BurgerTime – Burger Time. The N Team has a Warp Zone to the world in the Palace of Power's kitchen.
- California Games – the beach-themed California Games, it is the setting where Kevin reunites with his high school friends when they compete against Dr. Wily's Robot Masters and where Kevin and Mega Man spend time while waiting for Dr. Wright and Dr. Wily to complete their peace-keeping robot.
- Castlevania - Castlevania.
- Castlevania II: Simon's Quest – music from the game was used.
- Castlevania III: Dracula's Curse
- Contra – Sound effects from the game are used.
- Donkey Kong – Kongoland. Music from the game was used.
- Donkey Kong Jr. – Simon believed that he was Donkey Kong Junior when he had amnesia. Music from the game was used.
- Dragon Warrior (now referred to as Dragon Quest) – Dragon's Den.
- Faxanadu – Faxanadu, which is inhabited by dwarves and elves.
- Final Fantasy – Final Fantasy.
- Jordan vs. Bird: One on One – Hoopworld.
- Kid Icarus – Mount Icarus.
- Marble Madness – the studio world of Marblopolis, which is structurally inspired by Marble Madness, including a black marble weapon that Mother Brain uses to attack the N Team. The theme from the first level of Marble Madness is also used.
- Mega Man – Megaland. Music from the game is used and the original Robot Masters appear.
- Mega Man 2 – the Robot Masters from the game appear, with the exception of Flashman.
- Mega Man 3 – Rush, Topman, Doc Robot, and Gamma appear.
- Metroid – Metroid. Music from the game is also used.
- Nemesis – music from the game is used in Season 2, including the Stage 2 theme "Fortress".
- Mike Tyson's Punch-Out!! – Punch-Out. Music from the game is used.
- Paperboy – News World, where the Daily Sun newspaper is published.
- Puss 'n Boots: Pero's Great Adventure – Puss 'n Boots, which is inhabited by anthropomorphic animals.
- Robin Hood: Prince of Thieves – Nottingham.
- Solar Striker – music from the game is used. The Stage 1/2 theme from the game is used.
- Super Mario Bros. – Kevin compares the Ultimate Warp Zone to the game. Many sound effects, such as for jumping, came from the game. The music for the underground and fortress stages is used, and some background music and featured songs were also used in The Super Mario Bros. Super Show!.
- Super Mario Bros. 2 – music and sound effects from the game are used.
- Tetris – Tetris. Music from the game is used.
- Wizards & Warriors – Excalibur, which is inhabited by giant spiders, werewolves, and other monsters and which the N Team travels to fight Malkil. Malkil also appeared in The Power Team along with his enemy, the knight Kuros.
- The Legend of Zelda – Hyrule.
- Zelda II: The Adventure of Link – Rebonack from the game appears.

Despite featuring various video games, the Super Mario games were absent, despite being mentioned. This is likely due to The Super Mario Bros. Super Show, which aired around the same time and featured the characters and world of the Mario games.

== Development ==
The character of Captain N first appeared in Nintendo Power magazine, created by Nintendo staff member and magazine editor Randy Studdard. The original concept involved Captain N, originally known as Captain Nintendo, a Nintendo employee who had the power to temporarily bring characters and items from Nintendo games to life. He fought against Mother Brain, a piece of programming from a Nintendo game pack that went rogue.

Captain N was never called Captain Nintendo due to legal concerns from the Children's Television Act of 1990, which called for bans on program-length commercials. The show was originally known as Captain Nintendo: The Game Master.

Though the show had an open-ended ending, as Mother Brain is defeated but Captain N vows to stop her when she returns, Nintendo of America decided to follow Studdard's ideas and create a cartoon series, opting to neither credit nor compensate its creator. DIC Entertainment was shopped as the animation studio, and changed various aspects of the original idea while keeping the main premise of the Captain opposing Mother Brain as he interacted with various video game characters.

Captain Nintendo appeared in a prerecorded Nintendo Universe tip line series by Nintendo that was updated weekly. Along with his computer companion Emerald, he offered tips on Nintendo Game Paks and upcoming game announcements.

In the early stages of development, the character of Paperboy from the game of the same name was intended to be the protagonist, and the series was initially going to be titled Buddy Boy.

== Media ==
=== Comic book ===
The Captain N comic book was published by Valiant Comics as part of the Nintendo Comics System in 1990. Despite being based on the cartoon, the comics differed from it, having a more serious tone and lacking third-party characters Simon Belmont, Mega Man, Dr. Wright, the Count, and Dr. Wily. Samus Aran, who did not appear in the series, was a recurring character who falls in love with Kevin and becomes Lana's rival for his affections. When asked by a fan why Samus did not appear in the television series, Jeffrey Scott said that he never heard of her.

An article at 1UP.com describes Samus as "rambunctious, reckless, and gets into pissing contests with Lana over Kevin's affections, which makes for some of the most entertaining situations in the series". The reviewer added: "Not to say that the deadly quiet, contemplative Samus who fights for truth and justice in the more recent Metroid games isn't awesome, but there's something compelling about a Samus who's greedy and conniving – and is proud to admit it".

Mother Brain's second-in-command was Uranos, the God of the Sky, based on a regular enemy from Kid Icarus. Pit's toga was changed from white to yellow and Lana's dress was purple. She wields a scepter, which she had in concept art, but which she was only shown using in one episode.

In the last printed issue of the comic book, a letter column promised that Mega Man would appear, but this did not happen due to the comic's sudden cancellation. The first issue was to be included as a digital reprint on the DVD set, but this did not happen due to the rights to the comic being in limbo.

=== VHS releases ===
In the early 1990s, three Season 2 episodes each were released on a single VHS by Buena Vista Home Video in the US: "Gameboy", "Quest for the Potion of Power", and "The Trouble with Tetris".

=== DVD ===
Captain N was released in Region 1 on February 27, 2007, by Shout! Factory.

==== Omissions ====
Season 3 was considered to be part of a different series, due to sharing a half-hour block with the Super Mario World cartoon on NBC in the fall of 1991; copyright holders required that the Captain N and Super Mario World episodes be released together. Captain N & The New Super Mario World were later released on DVD in a separate two-disc set on November 13, 2007. This was not repeated in 2013 as the Super Mario World episodes would be released alone due to likeness rights issues with the use of Bo Jackson in the episode "Battle of the Baseball Know-It-Alls". The release of Season 3 has since been limited to streaming.

The unfinished original version of "How's Bayou" was included in this set, rather than the revised version aired in reruns. "When Mother Brain Rules", a clip show episode, was not included on the master tapes that DiC sent to Shout! Factory and was not included on the DVD set.

A two-minute-long scene from the episode "Queen of the Apes" is absent from the earliest DVD releases, making it run two minutes shorter than others. Missing from the DVD is the "underwater piranha battle" scene with Kevin and Simon and some of the "hoisting Mother Brain's body up a cliff" scene with Kid Icarus and Mega Man. Brian Ward of Shout! Factory has stated that this was an authoring error, and a replacement disc program was initiated.

Covers of pop songs used in the original broadcasts were replaced with an instrumental version of the "Mega Move" song from "The Feud of Faxanadu" due to concerns over the songs' broadcast rights. The songs in Season 2 were performed exclusively for the series and were not removed. According to Brian Ward from Shout! Factory, legal concerns on using pop songs in the original broadcast for eventual home media release were never considered. He also stated that this is mainly the reason why the original projected release year for 2006 was pushed to 2007.

=== Releases ===
The DVD set is packaged in two double-disc thin packs. The booklet planned for the set was omitted due to time constraints, as no further delays were wanted.

DVD name	Ep #	Release date	Additional information
Captain N: The Game Master – The Complete Series	26	February 27, 2007	Map of Videoland-style menus; Character Video Bios, including narration taken directly from the text of the Captain N bible; Exploring Videoland: Concept art for the worlds and locations of Captain N: The Game Master; "Captain Nintendo" – the original Nintendo Power short story

A single-disc release titled "Adventures in Videoland", containing 4 episodes, was released by NCircle Entertainment on July 22, 2008.

==== Regional DVD releases ====
Season 3 is available on DVD in the United States and Australia alongside the Super Mario World cartoon.

Pidax released the complete series along with Super Mario World in Germany with English audio in three boxsets, but did not include "When Mother Brain Rules".

=== Film ===
Actor and writer Noel Clarke revealed to Digital Spy in an interview that he was interested in developing a live-action film adaptation of the series.

== Syndication and changes ==
Captain N entered broadcast syndication and aired on local stations from 1992 to 1993 when the rights were secured by Rysher Entertainment. Captain N & The Video Game Masters was a 65-episode package that included Captain N: The Game Master, The Legend of Zelda, The Adventures of Super Mario Bros. 3, and Super Mario World.

- Video Game Masters had its own theme song, followed by a commercial break and then the theme song of the series being aired.
- Like The Super Mario Bros. Super Show, action/chase scenes in the first-season episodes were set to studio covers of pop music, including Bob Seger's "Shakedown" in "Kevin in Videoland" and Kenny Loggins' "Danger Zone in "Mega Trouble for Megaland". Due to copyright issues, these songs were removed in later reruns and releases and replaced by an instrumental glam-rock song from Season 2's "The Feud of Faxanadu".
- The Zelda episodes were cut for time when aired in the Video Game Masters package, with two episodes airing in each half-hour block.
- Many episodes received minor changes when released in syndication as part of the Captain N & The Video Game Masters package. All episodes were time compressed and split into two acts instead of three to fit in the time slot. All episodes except "The Feud of Faxanadu" used the second season intro and credits, and Season 3 episodes cut out the opening title card for each episode.

== Other airings ==
=== Family Channel ===
Family Channel aired the first 26 episodes from fall 1991 to summer 1992, while Season 3 aired on NBC. Episodes were time compressed into four acts rather than two or three to fit in the time slot and fit more commercials, making episodes around two minutes shorter. Family Channel airings included the featured songs that played on the NBC airing, unlike later airings on WGN, Fox, and USA Network.

=== USA Network ===
Starting in the fall of 1993, USA Network aired reruns of the series on their Sunday lineup of their USA Cartoon Express animation block. Unlike other reruns, USA opted to edit scenes out of various episodes to fit in the time slot and more commercials. In 1994, the series was taken off of most channels.

=== Alternative versions of episodes ===
- "How's Bayou": The original version of the episode, which aired on September 16, 1989, differed from the version aired in later airings. It featured some dialogue changes/rearrangements and an alternative piece of instrumental music in the scene with Kevin and Lana dancing, along with other minor changes and several shots missing backgrounds. The Shout Factory DVD release contains this episode in its unfinished form, with the cover of "Born on the Bayou" replaced with the "Mega Move" instrumental and the teaser shown before the intro. Since its rerun in December 1989 and in later reruns, the episode aired in its finished form, but the unfinished version has not been officially released.
- "When Mother Brain Rules": A "clip show" episode, it has at least two different versions. Several scenes have dialogue but no music and vice versa. In the second version, many of these sequences are changed around and more commentary, particularly by Simon, is added.
- Some of the Season 1 and Season 2 episodes, specifically "Nightmare on Mother Brain's Street", "Quest for the Potion of Power", "Invasion of the Paper Pedalers", "Three Men and a Dragon", & "Mr. and Mrs. Mother Brain" were recut to 10 minutes long for airing during Season 3 as filler, along with the soundtrack being re-scored. Unlike the other episodes, "Quest for the Potion of Power" was split into two parts and had new narration added, as well as having the music redone.

== See also ==
- The Power Team
- The Super Mario Bros. Super Show!
