= Hates =

Hates may be:

- the plural of “hate” (as a noun) or a conjugated verb form of “hate”
- a surname:
  - Adrian Hates, German musician

== See also ==
- Hate (disambiguation)
- Hades (disambiguation)
