= Andrés Reisinger =

Argentinian digital artist

- Born: 1990 (age 35–36); Buenos Aires, Argentina
- Occupations: Digital artist, designer, visual artist
- Years active: 2011 –
- Known for: Digital art, Non-fungible token
- Notable work: Hortensia; The Shipping; Arcadia
- Website: Official website

Andrés Reisinger is an Argentinian visual artist and designer based between Madrid and Barcelona, Spain. He is the founder of Reisinger Studio, a multidisciplinary design studio with locations in Madrid as well as Barcelona. Reisinger is widely known for industrial design, craft, interior design and conceptual art.

== Early life ==
Reisinger was born in Buenos Aires, in 1990. Initially, he studied music at Conservatorio Nacional Superior de Música. Later he attended the Faculty of Architecture, Design and Urbanism, University of Buenos Aires where he studied graphic design.

== Career ==
Reisinger began his professional career in 2011 as an art director at Plenty, an animation and motion graphic company based in Buenos Aires. In 2014, together with Ezequiel Pini, he co-founded Six N. Five, a multidisciplinary design studio situated in Buenos Aires. Reisinger worked at Six N. Five for 4 years before founding Reisinger Studio in Barcelona, Spain, in 2018.

=== Hortensia ===
In 2018, Reisinger designed Hortensia, a virtual armchair covered in pink petals inspired by hydrangea flower. Reisinger posted the digitally rendered version of Hortensia on Instagram in July 2018, after which the design went viral globally and received coverage from major news outlets including Dezeen and Designboom. A physical version of Hortensia was later produced and exhibited at Montoya Gallery in 2018. In 2021, Moooi, a Dutch furniture company collaborated with Reisinger to mass produce the physical version of his Hortensia chair.

=== The Shipping ===
In February 2021, Reisinger designed 10 virtual furniture designs and offered them at an online auction titled The Shipping via the online marketplace Nifty Gateway. All of the 10 designs were sold within minutes for more than $450,000.

=== Arcadia ===
In October 2021, Reisinger collaborated with RAC, a Portuguese-American musician and poet Arch Hades and created Arcadia, an NFT-based short film. Arcadia is an interdisciplinary project which was sold for nearly half a million dollars at an auction at Christie's in November 2021.

=== Take Over ===
In January 2023, Reisinger began sharing his digital artwork series, Take Over, on social media. This series features iconic buildings in major cities covered in pink drapes and installations. After digitally portraying cities like Rome, London, Paris and Tokyo, Reisinger created the first physical representation of Take Over with Take Over Miami, showcased during Miami Art Week in December 2023. Following this, he presented the physical installations Take Over Jeddah during the Balad Al-Fann festival, Take Over Madrid and a Take Over in New York in collaboration with Hourglass.

=== Other works ===
Since 2018, Reisinger's designs have been exhibited all around the globe at various art galleries. He has also collaborated commercially with some of the prominent international companies including Audi, Microsoft 365, Kettal, Tylko, Cassina, Ikea, Dior Beauty, Zara, Gucci, Nahmias, Golden Goose as well as with Ximena Caminos. In 2019, he was recognized as one of the Young Guns Art Directors Club by The One Club. Later that year and also in 2022, he was listed in Architectural Digest 100, a list by Architectural Digest that recognizes the most influential interior designers and architects around the world. In 2020, Reisinger was selected as Forbes 30 under 30 by Forbes.

== Exhibitions ==
- 2018 – 1000 Vases – Espace Commines, Paris, France
- 2019 – QTS – Buenos Aires, Argentina
- 2019 – Complicated Sofa – Fuorisalone, Milan, Italy
- 2019 – Job Interview – Last Resort Gallery, Copenhagen, Denmark
- 2019 – Maze – 1stdibs Gallery, New York, US
- 2019 – Hortensia Chair – Montoya Gallery, Barcelona, Spain
- 2020 – Job Interview – Last Resort Gallery, Copenhagen, Denmark
- 2020 – Hortensia Chair – Collectible Fair, Brussels, Belgium
- 2020 – Hortensia Chair – Design Museum Gent, Ghent, Belgium
- 2021 – The Shipping – Nifty Gateway, US
- 2021 – Odyssey – Nilufar Gallery, Milan, Italy
- 2021 – Arcadia – Christie's, New York, US
- 2021 – The Smell of Pink – Miami, Florida
- 2022 – Winter House – Metaverse
- 2022 – Pollination – Nifty Gateway, US
- 2022 – SUN:LEAF – Collectional Gallery, Dubai, United Arab Emirates
- 2022 – ARCADIA – Palazzo Strozzi, Firenze, Italy
- 2022 – TOO MUCH, TOO SOON! – Nilufar Gallery, Milan, Italy
- 2023 – TODOS LOS DIAS SALE EL SOL – Lollapalooza, Buenos Aires, Argentina
- 2023 – A Journey into the New Virtual – Museum of Applied Arts, Vienna, Austria
- 2023 – Impression, Sunrise - Impression Isla Mujeres by Secrets, Quintana Roo, Mexico
- 2024 – 12 Chairs for Meditation – Nilufar Gallery, Milan, Italy
- 2024 – Science Fiction Design: From Space Age to Metaverse – Vitra Schaudepot, Weil am Rhein, Germany

== Recognition ==
- 2019 – Young Gun (Art Directors New York City) – The One Club
- 2019 – Architectural Digest 100 – Architectural Digest
- 2020 – Forbes 30 under 30 – Forbes
