= Kid Icarus =

1986 video game

- North American NES box art
- Developers: Nintendo R&D1; Tose
- Publisher: Nintendo
- Director: Satoru Okada
- Producer: Gunpei Yokoi
- Designers: Toru Osawa; Yoshio Sakamoto
- Programmers: Yasu Shimokawa; Ichiro Takigawa
- Artists: Toru Osawa; Makoto Kano
- Composer: Hirokazu Tanaka
- Series: Kid Icarus
- Platforms: Famicom Disk System, NES, Game Boy Advance, Nintendo 3DS
- Release: December 19, 1986: Famicom Disk System; JP: December 19, 1986 NES; EU: February 15, 1987; NA: July 1987 Game Boy Advance; JP: August 10, 2004 Nintendo 3DS; JP: January 18, 2012; EU: February 2, 2012; AU: April 12, 2012; NA: April 19, 2012
- Genres: Action, platform
- Mode: Single-player

Kid Icarus (Note: Known in Japan as Light Myth: Palutena's Mirror (Japanese: 光神話 パルテナの鏡, Hepburn: Hikari Shinwa: Parutena no Kagami)) is a 1986 action-platform game developed and published by Nintendo for the Family Computer Disk System in Japan and the Nintendo Entertainment System in Europe and North America. It was released in Japan in December 1986, in Europe in February 1987, and in North America in July.

The plot of Kid Icarus revolves around protagonist Pit's quest for three sacred treasures, which he must equip to rescue the Greek-inspired fantasy world Angel Land and its ruler, the goddess Palutena. The player controls Pit through platform areas while fighting monsters and collecting items. The objective is to reach the end of the levels, and to find and defeat boss monsters that guard the three treasures. The game was developed by Nintendo's Research and Development 1 division with assistance with an external company (later identified to be Tose), which helped with testing. It was designed by Toru Osawa and Yoshio Sakamoto, directed by Satoru Okada, and produced by Gunpei Yokoi.

Kid Icarus had a mixed critical reception but became a cult classic. Reviewers praised its music and its mixture of gameplay elements from different genres, but criticized its graphics and high difficulty level. It was included in several lists of the best games compiled by IGN and Nintendo Power.

It was later re-released for the Game Boy Advance in Japan in 2004. It was released on the Wii's Virtual Console in 2007 and the Wii U's Virtual Console in 2013. A 3D Classics remake was released in Japan in 2011 and in North America, Europe, and Australia in 2012. In 2016, Kid Icarus was included on the North American and PAL region releases of the NES Classic Edition. It was released on the Nintendo Classics service in 2019.

A sequel, Kid Icarus: Of Myths and Monsters, was released for the Game Boy in 1991. A third entry in the series, Kid Icarus: Uprising, was released for the Nintendo 3DS in March 2012, after Pit's inclusion as a playable character in the 2008 game Super Smash Bros. Brawl.

== Gameplay ==
Pit fights the monsters of the game with a bow and arrow. The player character's health and the number of hearts is displayed in the top-left corner of the screen. Doors in levels lead to different chambers, such as treasuries or item stores.

Kid Icarus is a side-scrolling platformer with role-playing elements. The player controls the protagonist Pit through two-dimensional levels, which contain monsters, obstacles and items. Pit's primary weapon is a bow with an unlimited supply of arrows that can be upgraded with three collectable power items: the Protective Crystal shields Pit from enemies, the Flaming Arrows hit multiple targets, and the Sacred Bow increases the range of the arrows. These upgrades will work only if Pit's health is high enough. The game keeps track of the player's score, and increases Pit's health bar at the end of a level if enough points were collected.

Throughout the stages, the player may enter doors to access seven different types of chambers. Stores and black markets offer items in exchange for hearts, which are left behind by defeated monsters. Treasure chambers contain items, enemy nests give the player an opportunity to earn extra hearts, and hot springs restore Pit's health. In the god's chamber, the strength of Pit's bow and arrow may be increased depending on several factors, such as the number of enemies defeated and the amount of damage taken in battle. In the training chamber, Pit will be awarded with one of the three power items if he passes a test of endurance.

The game world is divided into three stages: the Underworld, the Overworld (Earth) and the Skyworld. Each stage encompasses three unidirectional area levels and a fortress. The areas of the Underworld and Skyworld stages have Pit climb to the top, while those of the surface world are side-scrolling levels. The fortresses at the end of the stages are labyrinths with non-scrolling rooms, in which the player must find and defeat a gatekeeper boss. Within a fortress, Pit may buy a check sheet, pencil, and torch to guide him through the labyrinth. A single-use item, the mallet, can destroy stone statues, which frees a flying soldier called a Centurion that will aid the player in boss battles. For each of the bosses destroyed, Pit receives one of three sacred treasures that are needed to access the fourth and final stage, the sky temple. This last portion abandons the platforming elements of the previous levels, and resembles a scrolling shooter.

== Plot ==
The game is set in Angel Land, which is a fantasy world with a Greek mythology theme. Before the events of the game, Earth was ruled by Palutena (Goddess of Light) and Medusa (Goddess of Darkness). Palutena bestowed the people with light to make them happy. Medusa hated the humans, dried up their crop, and turned them to stone. Enraged by this, Palutena transformed Medusa into a monster and banished her to the Underworld. Out of revenge, Medusa conspired with the monsters of the Underworld to take over Palutena's residence the Palace in the Sky. She launched a surprise attack, and stole the three sacred treasures — the Mirror Shield, the Light Arrows and the Wings of Pegasus — which deprived Palutena's army of its power. After her soldiers had been turned to stone by Medusa, Palutena was defeated in battle and imprisoned deep inside the Palace in the Sky.

With her last power, she sent a bow and arrow to the young angel Pit. He escapes from his prison in the Underworld and sets out to save Palutena and Angel Land. Throughout the course of the story, Pit retrieves the three sacred treasures from the fortress gatekeepers at their respective fortresses in the Underworld, the Overworld, and the Skyworld. Afterward, he equips himself with the treasures and storms the sky temple where he defeats Medusa and rescues Palutena. The game has five different endings; depending on the player's performance, Palutena may present Pit with headgear or transform him into a full-grown angel. In the Japanese version, the best ending from the English version does not exist, and instead another bad ending is present.

== Development ==
The game was designed at Nintendo's Research and Development 1 (R&D1) division. It was developed for the Family Computer Disk System (FDS) because its floppy disk, called Disk Card, has three times the storage capacity of the Family Computer's cartridges of the time. Combined with the possibility to store the players' progress, the Disk Card format enabled the developers to create a longer game with a more extensive game world. Kid Icarus was the debut of Toru Osawa (credited as Inusawa) as a video game designer, and he was the only staff member working on the game at the beginning of the project. Originally he wanted to make an action game with role-playing elements, and wrote a story rooted in Greek mythology, which he had always been fond of. He drew the pixel art, and wrote the technical specifications, which were the basis for the playable prototype. After Nintendo's action-adventure Metroid had been finished, more staff members were allotted to the development of Kid Icarus.

The game was directed by Satoru Okada (credited as S. Okada), and produced by the general manager of the R&D1 division, Gunpei Yokoi (credited as G. Yokoi). Hirokazu Tanaka (credited as Hip Tanaka) composed the music. Yoshio Sakamoto (credited as Shikao.S) joined the team upon return from his vacation after the completion of Metroid. He streamlined the development process, and made many decisions that affected the design of Kid Icarus. Several out-of-place elements were included in the game, such as credit cards, a wizard turning player character Pit into an eggplant, and a large, moving nose that was meant to resemble composer Tanaka. Sakamoto attributed this unrestrained humor to the former personnel of the R&D1 division, which he referred to as "strange". Osawa said that he had originally tried to make Kid Icarus completely serious, but opted for a more humorous approach after objections from the team.

To meet the projected release date of December 19, 1986, the staff members worked overtime and often stayed in the office at night. They used torn cardboard boxes as beds, and covered themselves in curtains to resist the low temperatures of the unheated development building. Eventually, Kid Icarus was finished and entered production a mere three days before the release date. Several ideas for additional stages had to be dropped because of these scheduling conflicts.

== Release ==
In February and July 1987, respectively, a cartridge-based version was published for the NES in Europe and North America. For this release, the graphics of the ending were updated, and staff credits were added. Unlike the Japanese version, which saves the player's progress on the Disk Card, the cartridge version uses a password system to restore progress, an almost unprecedented feature.

In August 2004, Kid Icarus was re-released in the Famicom Mini Disk System Selection for the Game Boy Advance. It was released on the Wii's Virtual Console on January 23, 2007, in Japan, on February 12 in North America, and on February 23 in Europe and Australia; it was released on the Wii U's Virtual Console on August 14, 2013, in Japan, on July 11 in Europe and Australia, and on July 25 in North America. Passwords from the NES version do not work in the Virtual Console version. In 2016, the game was included on the North American and PAL region releases of the NES Classic Edition. In 2019, it was released on the Nintendo Classics service.

=== 3D Classics ===
A 3D Classics remake of Kid Icarus was published for the Nintendo 3DS handheld console. The remake features stereoscopic 3D along with updated graphics including backgrounds. It uses the save system instead of passwords. It has the Family Computer Disk System's extra sound channel for music and sound effects.

It became available on the Nintendo eShop on January 18, 2012, in Japan, on February 2 in Europe, on April 12 in Australia, and on April 19 in North America. It was available early for free via download code to users who registered two selected 3DS games with Nintendo in Japan, Europe, and Australia. In Japan, it was available to users who registered any two Nintendo 3DS games on Club Nintendo between October 1, 2011, and January 15, 2012, and became available for download starting on December 19, 2011; in Europe, it was available to users who registered any two of a selection of Nintendo 3DS games on Club Nintendo between November 1, 2011, and January 31, 2012, with the first batch of emails with codes being sent out on January 5, 2012; in Australia, it was available to users who registered any two of a selection of Nintendo 3DS games on Club Nintendo between November 1, 2011, and March 31, 2012, with the first batch of emails with codes being sent out in January 2012. In North America, download codes for the 3D Classics version were given to customers who pre-ordered Kid Icarus: Uprising at select retailers when they picked up the game, which was released on March 23, 2012, allowing them to obtain the game early.

== Reception ==
=== Contemporary reviews ===
Contemporary scores

Review score
Publication	Score
Famitsu	7/10, 6/10, 8/10, 6/10 (FDS)

Reviewing the release for the Famicom Disk System, Famicom Hisshoubon 's first reviewer complimented the game saying it felt fresh because of its simplicity and that its mysterious atmosphere would appeal to children and adults alike. The second reviewer felt the graphics didn't quite capture the Greek mythology setting of the game and said it felt a bit dated due to the wrap-around effects of moving character to the left off the screen to appear on the right side which they said was best left behind in the era of Pac-Man (1980). In Famicom Tsūshin, two reviewers said it was too similar and a lesser game than Metroid (1986). Two other commented on the games difficulty, with one reviewer saying the game makes players to extremely tense sequences without providing any pleasure for accomplishing them.

=== Retrospective reviews ===
Retrospective scores

Review scores
Publication	Score
GameSpot	5.1/10
IGN	7.0/10
Official Nintendo Magazine	68%

By late 2003, 1.76 million copies of Kid Icarus had been sold worldwide, with a cult following. It received mixed reviews from critics over the years. In October 1992, a staff writer of the UK publication Nintendo Magazine System said that it was "pretty good fun", but did not "compare too well" to other platform games, due in part to its "rather dated" graphics. Retro Gamer magazine's Stuart Hunt called it an "unsung hero of the NES" that "looks and sounds pretty". He described the music as "sublime", and the enemy characters as "brilliantly drawn". Although he considered the blend of gameplay elements from different genres a success, he said that it suffered from "frustrating" design flaws, such as its high difficulty level. Jeremy Parish of 1Up.com disagreed with the game's status as an "unfairly forgotten masterpiece" among its substantial Internet following. He found it to be "underwhelming", "buggy", and "pretty annoying", because of "shrill music, loose controls, and some weird design decisions". He said that the game was "[not] terrible, or even bad – just a little lacking". He recommended players to buy the Virtual Console version, if only because it allowed them to experience Kid Icarus "with a fresh perspective".

GameSpot's Frank Provo reviewed the Virtual Console version. He noted that the gameplay was "[not] the most unique blueprint for a video game", but that it had been "fairly fresh back in 1987". He considered the difficulty "excessive", and found certain areas to be designed to frustrate players. He said that the presentation had not aged well. Though favoring the Grecian scenery, he criticized the graphics for the small, bicolored, and barely animated sprites, the black backgrounds, and the absence of multiple scrolling layers. He said the music was "nicely composed", but the sound effects were "all taps and thuds". He was dissatisfied with the emulation, because the Virtual Console release preserves the slowdown problems of the NES, and removed its cheat codes. He warned potential buyers that they might appreciate Kid Icarus for its "straightforward gameplay and challenging level layouts", but might "find nothing special in the gameplay and recoil in horror at the unflinching difficulty". Lucas M. Thomas of IGN noted that the game design was "odd" and "not Nintendo's most focused". He said it had "[not] aged in as timeless a manner as many other first-party Nintendo games from the NES era", and described it as "one of those games that made a lot more sense back in the '80s, accompanied by a tips and tricks strategy sheet". He complimented the theme music, which he considered heroic and memorable. In his review of the Virtual Console release, Thomas criticized the removal of cheat codes as "nonsensical". He found it to be "not an issue worthy of a prolonged rant", but said that "[Nintendo has] willfully edited its product, and damaged its nostalgic value in the process".

Kid Icarus is IGN's 20th of the top 100 NES games and 84th of the top 100 games of all time. It is 34th on Electronic Gaming Monthly's 1997 "100 Best Games of All Time", which said it "was one of the first big NES games to show that the system went way beyond offering the single-screen arcade-style experience". In 2001 Game Informer ranked it the 83rd best game ever made. They claimed that despite its high level of difficulty and frustration, it was fun enough to be worth playing. The game was inducted into GameSpy's "Hall of Fame", and was voted 54th place in Nintendo Power's top 200 Nintendo games. Nintendo Power also listed it as the 20th best NES video game, and praised it for its "unique vertically scrolling stages, fun platforming, and infectious 8-bit tunes", but with "unmerciful difficulty". Official Nintendo Magazine placed the game 67th on a list of greatest Nintendo games.

== Legacy ==
=== Sequels ===
A Game Boy sequel to Kid Icarus, titled Kid Icarus: Of Myths and Monsters, was released in North America in November 1991, and in Europe on May 21, 1992. It was developed by Nintendo and Tose, and largely adopts the gameplay mechanics of its predecessor. Of Myths and Monsters remained the last installment in the series for over 20 years.

In 2008, a 3D Kid Icarus game for the Wii was allegedly in development by the German American studio Factor 5, but was in production without the approval of Nintendo, and Factor 5 canceled multiple projects following the closure of its American branch in early 2009. In a 2010 interview, Yoshio Sakamoto was asked about a Kid Icarus game for the Wii, to which he replied that he was not aware of any plans to revive the franchise. A new series entry for the Nintendo 3DS, Kid Icarus: Uprising, was eventually released in 2012. The game is a third-person shooter, and was developed by Project Sora, the company of Super Smash Bros. designer Masahiro Sakurai.

=== Other appearances ===
Pit is a recurring character named "Kid Icarus" in the American animated television series Captain N: The Game Master, and made cameo appearances in Nintendo games such as Tetris, F-1 Race, and the Super Smash Bros. series.

In May 2011, independent developer Flip Industries released Super Kid Icarus, an unofficial Flash game with a SNES style.

In The Super Mario Bros. Movie, Mario is seen playing Kid Icarus in his room shortly after an argument with his family.
