= Hades (band) =

Hades is an American speed/power metal band, formed in Paramus, New Jersey, in 1978 while the band members were in high school. Notably, they opened for American glam rock band Twisted Sister on a local date.

== Reception ==
Their 1987 album Resisting Success and their 1988 album If at First You Don't Succeed both received 9/10 ratings in Rock Hard.

Both their 1980s albums have been remastered and re-released several times. Both the 2011 edition and the 2024 edition of If at First You Don't Succeed received perfect 10 scores from Powermetal.de. Perfect 10 scores were also given to re-releases of Resisting Success by magazine Rock Hard as well as Powermetal.de.

== Studio albums ==
- Resisting Success (1987)
- If at First You Don't Succeed (1988)
- Exist to Resist (1995)
- $avior$elf (1999)
- The Downside (2000)
- DamNation (2001)
