= Arch Hades =

British poet

- Born: 17 March 1992 (age 34); Saint Petersburg, Russia
- Education: Wycombe Abbey
- Occupation: Poet

Arch Hades (born 17 March 1992) is a British poet and artist. Hades writes lyrical poetry about modern romance and poetry-of-philosophy. Her poetry volumes include High Tide, Fool's Gold, Paper Romance, Arcadia, 21C Human, and All the love I gave is yours to keep. Working at the intersection of fine art and the spoken word, she extends upon the common themes of existentialism, isolation and contemporary angst found in her poetry, manifesting the same on canvas. Her works blend surrealism and romanticism with literary references.

== Life and education ==
Hades was born on 17 March 1992 in Saint Petersburg, Russia. Her birth name is not Arch Hades, and she has legally changed her name several times. Her father, a businessman who embraced democracy and liberalism, was murdered in an alleyway in Saint Petersburg. At 8, she fled to London with the rest of her family, and they changed their names.

She was enrolled at Hill House Preparatory School before spending seven years at Wycombe Abbey, an all-girls boarding school, until she was 18. After studying philosophy, politics and economics at Warwick University, she began her career in politics.

== Career ==
After graduation, she worked as a parliamentary researcher. Later, she started posting her poetry on Instagram, generating a large fan following.

Hades is the author of six volumes of poetry: High Tide (2018), Fool's Gold (2020), Paper Romance (2021), Arcadia (2022), 21C Human (2023), and All the love I gave is yours to keep (2024). Hades' first book, High Tide, had sales of over 10,000 and was listed as number seven on Amazon's UK Poetry List. In 2019, it also entered the Top 20 in the USA Poetry Charts. In March 2021, Arch Hades sold her first artwork, a postcard, for $71,410.

She also collaborated with Andrés Reisinger and Grammy-winning musician RAC to create Arcadia, a narrated graphic film. In November 2021, Hades auctioned her poem Arcadia at Christie's twenty-first-century sale in New York in the form of a long abstract animation, soundtracked with a voiceover and electronic music. Arcadia was sold for $525,000. In May 2022, the Arcadia digital film had its museum debut at the Palazzo Strozzi Let's Get Digital exhibition.

In addition, she also contributes commentary on cultural discourse to newspapers, performs poetry readings, and gives talks on philosophy. In 2021, she spoke at Oxford University about twenty-first-century existentialism; in 2022, she discussed the connection between art and philosophy on a panel at the annual UCL conference. Hades then began working on a collection of political poems and a future project for an art gallery, Superblue before signing with Licht Feld Basel Gallery.

Her art fair debut was in 2024 at the Miami Art Basel. While turning her focus to physical art, her medium of choice was acrylic on canvas. She said in 2025 of her choice of acrylic that, “I like to work quickly, so acrylic suits me well as it dries fast, and you can layer it on very thick if you want to, like frosting on a cake, getting a large range of textures.” Her first solo exhibition was held at Berkeley Square in 2025, entitled “We Are All Just Passing Through”. In a review of the exhibition, Fad Magazine stated that “gleams like a mirage — sharp, mirrored, and meticulously composed. At first, it feels ethereal, almost mournful; but look closer and it’s about control. Not death, not despair, but the containment of feeling — anger held still, beauty disciplined, emotion rendered with surgical precision.” A review of the show stated that the work felt like it would “immerse you - in fact, stand in a certain spot in the gallery and you will find yourself in a sound shower, hearing the artist reading out her poetry. This kind of totality of approach makes this an intriguing artist to become drawn in by, an intellect with a heart and a route into other worlds.”

By 2026, Hades’s visual work had expanded to include large-scale painting, sculpture, text-based installation and sound.

In 2026, Hades presented her second solo exhibition, Return | Ritorno, at the Scoletta Battioro e Tiraoro di Venezia, staged during the 2026 Venice Biennale. Its central work, Return (2025), was a 22-panel site-specific painting installed across three walls and depicting 63 larger-than-life figures.The exhibition also included sculptural and text-based works, including Sphinx (2026), Isle (2025), the Confessions series and Murmuring Bark (2025).

== Personal life ==
At age 8, she fled to London with her family after her father was murdered in Saint Petersburg, Russia. In 2022, following the 2022 Russian invasion of Ukraine, she donated £30,000 to charities aiding Ukrainian refugees and publicly called for Putin to be tried for war crimes. Upon purchasing a home studio in the countryside, she has said in terms of the home she seeks that, “My main inspirations were Horace Walpole’s Strawberry Hill House in Twickenham and the Austrian National Library in Vienna.”
