= Kid Icarus: Of Myths and Monsters =

1991 video game

Kid Icarus: Of Myths And Monsters
- North American box art
- Developers: Nintendo R&D1; Tose
- Publisher: Nintendo
- Producer: Gunpei Yokoi
- Designer: Masafumi Sakashita
- Programmer: Hideyo Kawaguchi
- Series: Kid Icarus
- Platform: Game Boy
- Release: NA: November 1991; EU: May 21, 1992
- Genres: Action, platform
- Mode: Single-player

Kid Icarus: Of Myths and Monsters is a 1991 action-platform game developed and published by Nintendo for the Game Boy. It is a sequel to Kid Icarus (1986) for the Nintendo Entertainment System. It was released in North America on November 1991, and in Europe on May 21, 1992, but not in Japan where it was already developed until on February 8, 2012 through the 3DS Virtual Console; this project retained its original English localization and commemorated the release of the following month's Kid Icarus: Uprising in the same region, followed by its re-release in Europe on March 8, and North America on July 19. The game was also re-released on the Nintendo Classics service on November 26, 2025. The story of Of Myths and Monsters is influenced by Greek and Roman mythology, and follows the angel soldier Pit on his quest for three sacred treasures. His objective is to defeat the demon Orcos, who has invaded the kingdom of Angel Land. The game features the core gameplay mechanics of its predecessor. Players explore two-dimensional environments while collecting items and fighting monsters. Of Myths and Monsters was named the 18th best Game Boy game by Nintendo Power, and commended by critics for its gameplay, graphics, and music.

== Gameplay ==
Pit may collect items such as the protective crystals to improve his combat skills. In the last stage, he is equipped with the three sacred treasures, which increase his strength and defense, and enable him to fly.

Kid Icarus: Of Myths and Monsters is a side-scrolling platformer. It largely retains the gameplay of its predecessor, Kid Icarus. The player controls the young angel Pit, whose main weapon is a bow with an unlimited supply of arrows. The game's two-dimensional levels contain collectable items and obstacles such as enemies and traps. Pit's objective is to reach the end of three stages—the underworld tower, the overworld and the sky world tower – each of which is separated into three areas and a labyrinthine fortress. Upon completing one of a stage's areas, the player has the option of saving their progress, and Pit's health bar may be expanded if he has defeated enough enemies.

Unlike in Kid Icarus, the levels scroll freely in all four directions, which enables the player to explore previously visited environments. Pit can flap his wings in mid-air to slow his descent. In each area, there are hidden doors that lead to eight different types of chambers. In shops and black markets, the player may buy items such as healing potions in exchange for hearts, which are left behind by destroyed monsters. Information centers provide hints, hot springs restore Pit's health, and bat chambers give the player an opportunity to earn hearts. Treasuries hold items that can be obtained in a game of chance. In the sacred chamber, the weather god Zeus presents Pit with additional physical strength depending on the number of enemies defeated. The sacred training center has Pit take part in a test of endurance. His success will be awarded with one of three weapons, which will become active if his health is high enough: the protective crystals shield from enemies, and the fire arrows and long bow increase the vertical and horizontal range of the arrows, respectively. During the course of the game, the player must find and defeat guardian monsters in the fortresses to retrieve three sacred treasures—the Wings of Pegasus, the Silver Armor and the Light Arrows. These are special items, which grant Pit new abilities in the final stage, the sky palace.

== Plot ==
The game is set in the Greek mythological fantasy world Angel Land that is ruled by the goddess Palutena. Palutena has a nightmare, which a soothsayer interprets as a foreshadowing of an invasion by the demon Orcos and his minions. The goddess summons Pit—the leader of her army—and commands him to enter a special training that will give him the power to use Angel Land's three sacred treasures. To keep these safe from Orcos while Pit is on his mission, Palutena has them protected by three fortress guardians. After Pit has finished his training and defeated the guardians, the goddess equips him with the sacred treasures. Orcos appears and turns Palutena to stone, but Pit defeats him and saves her, restoring peace to Angel Land. In the ending, Pit soars into the sky. As in the Greek myth of Icarus, he flies too close to the sun and loses his wings.

== Development ==
Kid Icarus: Of Myths and Monsters was designed by Masafumi Sakashita, and developed by Nintendo in co-operation with the external company Tose. It was programmed by Hideyo Kawaguchi. It was released in North America in November 1991, and in Europe on May 21, 1992. As such, it is one of the few first-party Nintendo games that were not originally published in Japan.

The game received its first Japanese release when it was digitally re-released via the 3DS Virtual Console in 2012. It was later added to the Nintendo Classics service in 2025.

== Reception ==
The game has been met with generally favorable reviews. A writer of the UK publication Nintendo Magazine System awarded it a score of 71 percent, and described it as a "fairly jolly adaptation of the NES platform game [that] provides the fun, but is now getting rather long in the tooth". Joystiq's JC Fletcher said that it "advances significantly beyond its predecessor", yet "remains unquestionably Kid Icarus, the same weird game about shooting snakes falling out of inverted clay pots". A GamePro reviewer with the pseudonym "The Great McGillicuty" found the game's controls to be precise and accurate, and gave its gameplay the magazine's maximum score of five points. He said that the "music sets the mood", and that the graphics were fine in black and white, due to its large sprites and detailed backgrounds. IGN editor Audrey Drake called the game an "awesome sequel" because of its improvements over the gameplay of the original Kid Icarus. Although she found it to be "not as punishing ... and, perhaps, not as memorable" as the NES game, she thought that Of Myths and Monsters was "a solid title that has undeservedly been all-but-forgotten". GameZone's David Sanchez believed that it "faithfully captured the magic of the first game", and demanded a downloadable re-release for the Nintendo 3DS handheld console. Of Myths and Monsters is 18th in Nintendo Power's list of the 20 best Game Boy games. It remained the last installment in the Kid Icarus series for 21 years, until the 2012 third-person shooter Kid Icarus: Uprising for the Nintendo 3DS. The 3DS Virtual Console re-release was scored 8/10 in a Nintendo Life review.
