= Robin Hood: Prince of Thieves (video game) =

1991 video game

- North American NES box art
- Developers: Sculptured Software (NES); Bits Studios (GB)
- Publishers: NA: Virgin Games; EU: Mindscape
- Programmers: Peter Ward; Ken Moore; Ken Grand (NES); Andy Rogers (Game Boy)
- Artists: Les Pardew; Kelly Kofoed; Mike Lott; Lance Thornblad; Clark Sorenson (NES); Jon Baker (Game Boy)
- Composers: Paul Webb (NES); David Whittaker (Game Boy)
- Platforms: NES, Game Boy
- Release: NA: November 1991; EU: December 10, 1992
- Genre: Action-adventure
- Mode: Single-player

Robin Hood: Prince of Thieves is a video game released in 1991 for the Nintendo Entertainment System and Game Boy developed by Sculptured Software, Inc. and Bits Studios, respectively, and published by Virgin Games. Versions for Master System and Game Gear were also announced but cancelled. It was based on the film of the same name.

The game was featured as the cover game for the July 1991 issue of Nintendo Power magazine, but this issue was notorious for the fact that the game was not released until 4 months after the issue was released.

== Gameplay ==
The game features several modes of gameplay. The standard adventuring mode depicts the action from an overhead perspective as the player guides Robin through the environment, battling enemies. A second mode uses one-on-one duels, depicting the action from the side and features different controls that allows the player-controlled character to jump as well as attack and guard. The third mode, a melee mode, features action taking place from an extreme overhead perspective, allowing for the depiction of large-scale battles between large forces. This mode typically ensues when a large number of Robin's merry men and enemy soldiers clash. During a horse racing sequence, there is another mode, a blend of the overhead and side perspectives, as the horse must be guided to jump over debris and ultimately beat the competitor.

The game also has a loose equipping system, where nearly any object can be held as a weapon. When Duncan first joins Robin's band, he comes brandishing a chicken leg for attack.

== Story ==
The game opens in an Arab prison in Jerusalem. Robin Hood is in prison along with Peter Dubois and Azeem. Robin must free both of them and then they must make their escape. Peter is mortally wounded in the escape process, but Robin and Azeem escape to England.

Upon arrival in England, Robin finds that his father has been murdered and that the Sheriff of Nottingham is ruling England oppressively in the absence of King Richard. Maid Marian tells Robin that there are rumours that men are hiding out in Sherwood Forest from the sheriff and tells him to go there, seek them out and join them.

Once Robin joins the camp in Sherwood, it becomes Robin Hood's home base for the remainder of the game. He continually leaves camp to undertake various missions. Upon completing each mission, Robin must return to camp to find out what mission to undertake next. Eventually, Robin Hood takes his last mission to get rid of the Sheriff of Nottingham. Once Robin defeats the Sheriff, the game is won and concludes with a wedding of Robin Hood and Maid Marian, which is interrupted by King Richard, who has just returned to England. Richard gives Marian away and she and Robin are married.

== Reception ==
Reception

Review scores
Publication	Score
AllGame	3.5/5 (NES)
Power Unlimited	83% (GB)

Power Unlimited gave the Game Boy version a score of 83% commenting: "Robin Hood: Prince of Thieves is, of course, based on the movie, but not as bad as many other such games. On the contrary: it is very exciting and adventurous! It is a pity that the figures in the game do not look very nice".
