= Kid Icarus (series) =

- Logo since 2012
- Genres: Action, Platform
- Developers: Nintendo R&D1 (1986–1991); Tose (1986–1991); Project Sora (2012)
- Publisher: Nintendo
- Platforms: Famicom Disk System, Nintendo Entertainment System, Game Boy, Game Boy Advance, Nintendo 3DS
- First release: Kid Icarus; December 19, 1986
- Latest release: Kid Icarus: Uprising; March 22, 2012

Kid Icarus (Note: Known in Japan as Light Mythology: Palutena's Mirror (光神話 パルテナの鏡, Hikari Shinwa: Parutena no Kagami).) is a series of fantasy video games by Nintendo. Set in the fantasy world of "Angel Land", which is loosely based on Greco-Roman mythology, the gameplay combines action, adventure and platforming elements. The Kid Icarus franchise is known as a cult classic and a sibling series to the Metroid franchise.

The first installment, Kid Icarus, was released in 1986 for the Nintendo Entertainment System and received critical acclaim despite poor sales. A sequel, Kid Icarus: Of Myths and Monsters, was released for the Game Boy. Following a 20-year hiatus, Kid Icarus: Uprising was released in 2012 for the Nintendo 3DS.

== Development ==
Release timeline
| 1986 | Kid Icarus |
1987–1990
| 1991 | Of Myths and Monsters |
1992–2011
| 2012 | Uprising |

After Nintendo's release of commercially successful platforming games in the 1980s, including Donkey Kong, Ice Climber, and Super Mario Bros., as well as the critically acclaimed adventure game The Legend of Zelda, the company was interested in entering a different genre. They began work on an action game called Metroid, which was released on the Family Computer Disk System on August 6, 1986, and on the Nintendo Entertainment System the following year. Kid Icarus was developed alongside Metroid as its sister game, sharing elements and programmers with it. It was produced by Gunpei Yokoi, who previously produced Donkey Kong, Donkey Kong Jr. (1982), and the original Mario Bros. (1983), and music written by Hirokazu Tanaka, who also composed for Duck Hunt (1984).

A sequel, Kid Icarus: Of Myths and Monsters, would release on the Game Boy in 1991 in North America and 1992 in Europe. Japan would not receive the game until 2012, when it was rereleased on the 3DS Virtual Console. During the 1990s, gaming magazine Gamefan claimed that another project, Kid Icarus: Angel Land Story, also known as Super Kid Icarus, was in development for the Super NES. Several more attempts to revive the series were planned or rumored to be in development, including an installment for the Nintendo 64, plans by Capcom to retool cancelled GameCube exclusive Dead Phoenix as a new Kid Icarus game, and a revival for the Wii developed by Factor 5. None of these titles would come into fruition, leaving the series dormant for two decades. A third entry, Kid Icarus: Uprising, was released for the Nintendo 3DS in 2012, the first game in the series since 1991.

== Plot ==
Pit (top-left), Palutena (top-right), Dark Pit (bottom-left), and Medusa (bottom-right) serve as important characters narratively.

Pit first appeared in Kid Icarus (1986), in which he escapes his prison in the Underworld and sets out to save the Goddess of Light, Palutena, from the clutches of Medusa and her forces. Along the way, he overcomes Zeus' challenges and gains stronger weapons to combat the Underworld's forces.

In Kid Icarus: Of Myths and Monsters (1991), Palutena's nightmare is interpreted by a fate teller as an imminent invasion by the demon Orcos and his minions. The goddess summons Pit, the leader of her army, and tells him to obtain the three sacred treasures of Angel Land, which she has placed under the protection of three fortress guards to ensure their safety from Orcos. After Pit defeats the guards and finishes his training, Palutena gives him priceless wealth. In Kid Icarus: Uprising (2012), he works with Palutena to fight Medusa and her army, but soon finds himself in a greater battle against Medusa's master and the Underworld's true ruler, Hades.

== Characters ==
=== Pit ===
Pit (voiced by Antony del Rio in Uprising) is the main protagonist of the franchise. Originally the weakest among Palutena’s army for being flightless, he becomes empowered by the goddess’s strength upon being told that he is only hope left to defeat Medusa as long as he collects the Three Sacred Treasures in time. At the end of original game, he becomes Palutena’s most trusted servant, though the endings differ depending on how long the player spends throughout the game.

Pit's design was updated for his inclusion in Super Smash Bros. Brawl. According to Masahiro Sakurai, the creator of the Super Smash Bros. series and director of Kid Icarus: Uprising, he initially alternated between using Pit's 2D design, his cartoonish art design, and a 3D redesign for his inclusion before ultimately settling on the latter. Sakurai stated that Pit's redesign was based on the concept of how his appearance would have slowly modernized had the Kid Icarus series remained active, much like how Link's design has throughout the various installments of The Legend of Zelda series. In comparison to his previous design, Pit now appears approximately thirteen years old in angel years.

GamePro identified Pit's gameplay mechanics as taking elements from three of Nintendo's biggest franchises: Mario's jump, Link's ability-enhancing objects, and Samus Aran's projectiles. Pit takes inspiration from Greek mythology, with IGN's Lucas M. Thomas viewing him as a combination between Eros and Icarus and identifying his bow and his wings as his most iconic characteristics.

=== Eggplant Wizard ===
The Eggplant Wizard first appeared in the 1986 video game Kid Icarus. In the game, he serves as an arch-nemesis to Pit, depicted as an anthropomorphic eggplant sorcerer who can shoot eggplants at other characters and disable their abilities by encasing them in an eggplant. He also appeared in the animated television series Captain N: The Game Master, where he serves as an antagonist. The Eggplant Wizard was inspired by the game's creator Toru Osawa's passion for eggplants and the eggplant men from Wrecking Crew. Osawa said that he drew the character to celebrate his summer bonus. Shigeru Miyamoto and Masahiro Sakurai both consider the character key to the enduring popularity of the Kid Icarus series.

Since his debut in Kid Icarus, Eggplant Wizard has received largely positive reception from critics, with IGN writer Luca M. Thomas called him the "most popular, most cunning enemy character to come out" of the Kid Icarus series. Shacknews writer Ozzie Mejia called Eggplant Wizard the most aggravating antagonist in all of video games, writing that he threw his controller against the television out of frustration when playing the game as a kid. Destructoid writer Chad Concelmo ranked him as "the biggest asshole video game wizard", stating that there is no other character who has more hatred than Eggplant Wizard due to his high defense and ability to transform Pit into an eggplant. 1UP.com writer Jeremy Parish called him a weird idea for an enemy, but also Pit's most challenging, comparing him to the Hammer Bros. from the Mario franchise because they often come in pairs and throw projectiles at the player character. He, however, also noted that the Eggplant Wizards were worse because they would target Pit. Nonstop Nerd staff wrote that Eggplant Wizard can completely ruin anyone’s playthrough of the game due to being the most threatening enemy, and that those who played the game would be able to relate to this.

UGO Networks writer Chris Plante ranked the moment when Eggplant Wizard was turning people into eggplants as one of the 20 most memorable Nintendo Entertainment System moments. GamesRadar+ included Eggplant Wizard in their list of the "top seven edible enemies in gaming", stating that he was "one of the strangest, most talked-about weirdos in all of gaming" and questioned why he was in a game about Greek mythology. GamesRadar+ also claimed that the character was "clearly-designed-by-a-madman old bastard of the NES baddo fraternity" and that his "oddness belied a far more insidious property". Eggplant Wizard has been suggested as a playable character or item for Super Smash Bros. series by critics. Chris Morgan of Yardbarker named Eggplant Wizard as the true cult icon of early Nintendo and noted his charm.

Eggplant Wizard has been viewed as synonymous with the Kid Icarus series even outside the gaming community. Jason Cipriano of MTV Multiplayer Blog wrote that he described Eggplant Wizard as emblematic of the series' wacky design and stated that fans would be excited to see him appear in Kid Icarus: Uprising. To celebrate the release of the game, ABC News writer Lauren Torrisi featured several eggplant recipes. Ishaan Sahdev of Siliconera reported on a GameStop promotion for Kid Icarus: Uprising that gave away a selection of augmented reality 3DS cards, including Eggplant Wizard.

=== Other characters ===
- Palutena (voiced by Ali Hillis in Uprising and Super Smash Bros. Ultimate and Brandy Kopp in Super Smash Bros. for Wii U) is the Goddess of Light, who Pit serves. In Captain N: The Game Master, she is adapted as Princess Lana. Palutena is in a love triangle with Gabe Bell and Ezra Kunkel. Canonically she loves Ezra more and Gabe’s love for her may be unsolicited.
- Viridi (voiced by Hynden Walch in Uprising and Dayci Brookshire in Super Smash Bros. Ultimate) is the Goddess of Nature and leader of the Forces of Nature, who starts out as one of Pit and Palutena's enemies, but later becomes their ally.
- Dark Pit (voiced by Antony del Rio) is a doppelgänger of Pit created by Pandora using the Mirror of Truth, who works independently before allying with Pit and Palutena. Pit nicknames him Pittoo. He was featured as the front cover in Nintendo Blast's 2012 Portuguese book titled "Nintendo Blast Ano 3 Edições 25 a 36".
- Hades (voiced by S. Scott Bullock) is the Lord of the Underworld, Medusa's master and the main antagonist of Uprising.
- Magnus (voiced by Fred Tatasciore) is a human mercenary who aids Pit and worked alongside Gaol in the past before she joined Medusa's forces.
- Medusa (voiced by Cree Summer) is the Goddess of Darkness, who is later revealed to have been a pawn of Hades.
- Pandora (voiced by Nika Futterman) is the Goddess of Calamity. After Pit defeats her, Dark Pit absorbs her powers, but she later reclaims them from him during their fight at the Rewind Spring, where she restores her true body (sometimes called "Amazon Pandora").
- Pyrrhon (voiced by Troy Baker) is the God of the Sun, who acts like a superhero and helps to stop the Aurum's invasion.
- Arlon (voiced by Troy Baker) is the commander of the Lunar Sanctum, a military base that served as the prison for the Chaos Kin before being destroyed.
- Poseidon (voiced by Fred Tatasciore) is the God of the Sea, who opens the path for Pit to confront Thanatos.
- Phosphora (voiced by Kari Wahlgren) is a commander of the Forces of Nature that Pit defeats in the Thunder Cloud Temple.
- Dyntos (voiced by Alan Oppenheimer) is the God of the Forge, who builds the Great Sacred Treasure that Pit uses to defeat Hades.
- Thanatos (voiced by Danny Mann) is the God of Death and a commander of Medusa's army.
- Cragalanche is the boulder-like commander of the Forces of Nature.
- The Centurions are foot soldiers of Palutena's army.
- The Aurum are an alien invasion force who are drawn to Earth by the conflict between the gods.
- The Chaos Kin is an evil parasitic creature imprisoned in the Lunar Sanctum until Pit accidentally releases it.
