= Fire sale (disambiguation) =

Fire sale may refer to:

- Fire sale, the sale of goods at extremely discounted prices
  - Also used in sports to describe the situation where a team trades away many of its veteran players
- Fire Sale (film), a 1977 comedy film starring and directed by Alan Arkin
- "Fire Sale", the first episode in the Super Mario World TV series.
