= List of Mario television episodes =

This list of Mario television episodes covers three television series based upon Nintendo's Mario series of video games. The three series were produced by DIC Entertainment: The Super Mario Bros. Super Show! (1989) is based upon Super Mario Bros. and Super Mario Bros. 2; The Adventures of Super Mario Bros. 3 (1990) is based upon Super Mario Bros. 3; and Super Mario World (1991) is loosely based upon Super Mario World. All three series focus on the characters of Mario and Luigi assisting Princess Toadstool and Toad in thwarting the plots and schemes of King Koopa. Super Show would also feature additional live-action storylines following the Mario Bros. at their plumbing business in Brooklyn, and once per week would replace the usual animated Mario segment with one based on The Legend of Zelda.

Each series episodes is listed in order of airdate. The names "Princess Toadstool" and "King Koopa" are primarily used prior to the release of Super Mario 64, which define them as "Princess Peach" and "Bowser" respectively. The Koopalings are defined with different names and personalities in The Adventures of Super Mario Bros. 3 before the American names were decided by Nintendo, and retain these for Super Mario World. By 1991, all three Super Mario animated series had broadcast a combined total of 91 episodes.

== Series overview ==
Series	Episodes	Segments	Originally released		
Series	Episodes	Segments	First released	Last released	Network
The Super Mario Bros. Super Show! Super Mario Bros. The Legend of Zelda	65	130	September 4, 1989	November 30, 1989	Syndication
The Adventures of Super Mario Bros. 3	13	26	September 8, 1990	December 1, 1990	NBC
Super Mario World	13	13	September 14, 1991	December 7, 1991	NBC

== The Super Mario Bros. Super Show! ==
All episodes are listed in order of their original airdate, with the primary animated segment listed first, followed by the accompanying live-action segment. The writer credits are solely for the animated episodes, as the writers for the live-action segments are unknown. The episodes would re-air in 1990 under the name Club Mario, which replaced the show's original live-action segments with newer five-minute sequences.

Each of the segments are indicated in three different colors:

- Blue: Live-action segments
- Red: Super Mario Bros. segments
- Green: The Legend of Zelda segments

No.	Title	Directed by	Written by	Original release date	Prod. code
1	"Neatness Counts"	Dan Riba	Bruce Shelly and Reed Shelly	September 4, 1989	192-001
1	"The Bird! The Bird!"	Dan Riba	Bruce Shelly and Reed Shelly	September 4, 1989	192-001
Mario and Luigi get an obsession with neatness and demonstrate to Nicole Eggert how to unclog a sink. A Birdo mistakes Toad for her missing baby and kidnaps him, thus Mario, Luigi and Princess Toadstool must rescue him while avoiding Koopa's attacks.
2	"Day of the Orphan"	Dan Riba	Perry Martin	September 5, 1989	192-003
2	"King Mario of Cramalot"	Dan Riba	Perry Martin	September 5, 1989	192-003
A young girl named Patty (Danica McKellar) arrives at Mario and Luigi's claiming to be an orphan without a family or a place to go, so the plumbers invite her in for a stay. Karen Hartman and Jim Ward also guest-star as Patty's parents. Mario, Luigi, Toad and Toadstool come to Cramalot and meet Mervin. Koopa has moved into the king's castle after his death and crowned himself King. Mario finds a golden plunger, but it gets taken by Koopa. They are taken to a dungeon, but luckily Mervin saves them, and gives Mario Excalibur. They then fight Koopa who gets defeated. The plot of the episode is based on the legendary British ruler King Arthur.
3	"All Steamed Up"	Dan Riba	Phil Harnage	September 6, 1989	192-002
3	"Butch Mario & The Luigi Kid"	Dan Riba	Phil Harnage	September 6, 1989	192-002
Mario and Luigi fix Sgt. Slaughter's "Steam-O-Matic" steam cabinet, but Mario gets stuck in it and shrinks. Joseph S. Griffo guest stars as mini-Mario. King Koopa kidnaps Princess Toadstool, and Mario, Luigi, and Toad are made outlaws by Mouser. They end up getting tricked into imprisonment. The episode's plot is based on the film Butch Cassidy and the Sundance Kid.
4	"Marianne and Luigeena"	Dan Riba	Rowby Goren	September 7, 1989	192-004
4	"Mario's Magic Carpet"	Dan Riba	Rowby Goren	September 7, 1989	192-004
Cousins Marianne and Luigeena come to visit after Mario accidentally blurts out that Lyle Alzado is eating lunch with them. When Princess Toadstool winds up as the wench of an evil sultan, the Super Mario Bros. and Toad try to rescue her with the help of a bitter genie. The episode's plot is based upon the story of Aladdin.
5	"Slime Busters"	John Grusd	Bob Forward	September 8, 1989	192-053
5	"The Ringer"	John Grusd	Bob Forward	September 8, 1989	192-053
Luigi is possessed by a Slime Ghost, prompting the brothers to call Slime Buster Ernie Hudson (known for his portrayal of Ghostbuster character Winston Zeddemore) for help. Link has grown bored with his lifestyle in Hyrule and seeks a true "hero's" life, finding Zelda the only comfort worth having. Meanwhile, Zelda holds a wizarding competition and Ganon uses it as a plan to sneak into the castle and steal the Triforce. After he is discovered, Link and Zelda set aside their differences in order to stop him from escaping.
6	"The Mario Monster Mash"	Dan Riba	J. Larry Carroll and David Bennett Carren	September 11, 1989	192-005
6	"Rolling Down the River"	Dan Riba	J. Larry Carroll and David Bennett Carren	September 11, 1989	192-005
Dr. Frankenstein (Eugene Liebowitz) asks Mario and Luigi to help him with his experiment in promising his monster (Craig Armstrong) a normal brain. Mario and Luigi help a certain Mark Twang (based on Mark Twain) win a riverboat race against Koopa and save Princess Toadstool and Toad who were kidnapped.
7	"Bonkers from Yonkers"	Dan Riba	Jack Olesker	September 12, 1989	192-006
7	"The Great Gladiator Gig"	Dan Riba	Jack Olesker	September 12, 1989	192-006
A bop on Mario's head giving him amnesia forces Luigi to call in Dr. Sigmund Fruitcake (Larry Gelman) for help. Koopa hosts a fake spaghetti dinner to trap Princess Toadstool and Toad, then forces the Super Mario Bros. to fight back Tryclyde.
8	"Bats in the Basement"	Dan Riba	George Atkins	September 13, 1989	192-007
8	"Mario and the Beanstalk"	Dan Riba	George Atkins	September 13, 1989	192-007
A vampire named Count Zoltan Dracula (Jim Ward) arrives from Transylvania as a foreign exchange student. Mario and Luigi trade Princess Toadstool's cow for garbanzo beans. The beans grow into a beanstalk, leading the group to a castle in the sky owned by a giant Koopa. The episode's plot is based upon the fairytale of Jack and the Beanstalk.
9	"Will the Real Elvis Please Shut Up!"	Dan Riba	Sean Roche and David Ehrman	September 14, 1989	192-008
9	"Love 'Em and Leave 'Em"	Dan Riba	Sean Roche and David Ehrman	September 14, 1989	192-008
While preparing for an Elvis look-alike contest, Mario and Luigi get a visit from the real Elvis (Fred Travalena). Mario and friends are imprisoned by the obnoxious Queen Rotunda. After eating Mario's spicy ice cream, the queen accidentally drinks a love potion that makes her fall in love with Mario.
10	"Magic's Magic"	John Grusd	Phil Harnage	September 15, 1989	192-054
10	"Cold Spells"	John Grusd	Phil Harnage	September 15, 1989	192-054
Magic Johnson teaches Mario and Luigi magic tricks. It is spring cleaning in Hyrule and Link has to pitch in, but he quickly fakes a cold in order to get sympathy, which works on Spryte. While at the market, Ganon secretly augments her powers to cause chaos at the castle in a very Fantasia-like manner, allowing him to steal the Triforce.
11	"Mama Mia Mario"	Dan Riba	Tony Marino	September 18, 1989	192-009
11	"The Great BMX Race"	Dan Riba	Tony Marino	September 18, 1989	192-009
Mario and Luigi's bossy mother (also portrayed by Lou Albano) and aunt Luigeena (also portrayed by Danny Wells) come to visit. Mario and Luigi enter a BMX race against Mouser, Tryclyde, and a Koopa Troopa so that they can win the prize money.
12	"Alligator Dundee"	Dan Riba	Jack Hanrahan and Eleanor Burian-Mohr	September 19, 1989	192-011
12	"Stars in Their Eyes"	Dan Riba	Jack Hanrahan and Eleanor Burian-Mohr	September 19, 1989	192-011
Alligator Dundee (Paul Elder) hunts for an alligator that is stuck in Mario's basement, to the gator's dismay. Mario's group must free the natives of the planet Quirk from being Koopa's slaves.
13	"Dance"	Dan Riba	Larry Alexander	September 20, 1989	192-015
13	"Jungle Fever"	Dan Riba	Larry Alexander	September 20, 1989	192-015
As a birthday present from Mario, Luigi gets a free dance lesson from Shabba-Doo. While venturing through the Amazon Jungle to find a witch doctor, Mario, Luigi, and Toad are hit with itching powder.
14	"Cher's Poochie"	Dan Riba	J. Larry Carroll and David Bennett Carren	September 21, 1989	192-021
14	"Brooklyn Bound"	Dan Riba	J. Larry Carroll and David Bennett Carren	September 21, 1989	192-021
Cher (Pam Matteson) asks Mario and Luigi to baby-sit her pooch. Mario and Luigi meet up with another lost plumber from Brooklyn, who offers them the chance to return home.
15	"Wild Thing"	John Grusd	Bob Forward	September 22, 1989	192-055
15	"The White Knight"	John Grusd	Bob Forward	September 22, 1989	192-055
Mario and Luigi's niece Marilyn (Moon Zappa) shows up uninvited and starts a loud party. Link and Zelda face off against an ambush of Tinsuits and an Octorock when Prince Facade, a prince from a neighboring kingdom called Arcadia, arrives and sweeps Zelda off her feet. Dejected by this "Prince Charming", Link quits his duties and prepares to leave, but Ganon knows Facade's one weakness and plans to exploit it in order to kidnap Zelda.
16	"E.C. The Extra Creepy"	Dan Riba	Phil Harnage	September 25, 1989	192-024
16	"Toad Warriors"	Dan Riba	Phil Harnage	September 25, 1989	192-024
Mario's dream date from a computer system turns out to be an alien (Clare Carey). Koopa's road gang has stolen all the spaghetti sauce in Car Land, so Mario's group must work to get it back. The episode's plot is based upon the film Mad Max 2.
17	"The Marios Fight Back"	Dan Riba	Mark McCorkle and Robert Schooley	September 26, 1989	192-017
17	"The Fire of Hercufleas"	Dan Riba	Mark McCorkle and Robert Schooley	September 26, 1989	192-017
The Mario Bros. demonstrate their Mario Bros. Clog Cleaner for David Horowitz, but they accidentally create a monster from the clog. Mario and Luigi retrain an out-of-shape hero so that he can reclaim the stolen "Great Balls of Fire" from Koopa. The episode is based on the legendary Greek hero Hercules.
18	"Magician"	Dan Riba	Phil Harnage	September 27, 1989	192-014
18	"Count Koopula"	Dan Riba	Phil Harnage	September 27, 1989	192-014
Magician Harry Blackstone Jr. visits Luigi. Mario's group enter a castle in Turtlevania, where Koopa and his minions are all monsters. The episode's plot is based on the novel Dracula.
19	"Do You Believe in Magic?"	Dan Riba	Ted Pedersen	September 28, 1989	192-012
19	"Pirates of Koopa"	Dan Riba	Ted Pedersen	September 28, 1989	192-012
Magic Johnson asks Luigi to fix his high school basketball trophy. While sailing on Captain Clump's ship, Blackbeard Koopa kidnaps Princess Toadstool in Pirate Waters, so that he can auction her off. After escaping from being eaten alive by Trouters, Mario and Luigi must pose as pirates in order to rescue her. The episode's plot is based on the opera performance of The Pirates of Penzance.
20	"Mommies Curse"	John Grusd	Phil Harnage	September 29, 1989	192-056
20	"Kiss'N Tell"	John Grusd	Phil Harnage	September 29, 1989	192-056
Luigi accidentally turns himself into a zombie and Elvira must restore him to normal. Zelda happens upon a damsel in distress, who insists on a handsome hero to rescue her from a Gleeok. When Link arrives and saves her, she rewards him with a passionate kiss, but she turns out to be a Gibdo in disguise who curses Link into a humanoid frog. Unable to be a hero in this form, Link takes the Triforce of Wisdom's advice and seeks help from the "Witch of Walls" for an answer after Zelda is kidnapped by Ganon.
21	"Lost Dog"	Dan Riba	Sean Roche and David Ehrman	October 2, 1989	192-010
21	"Two Plumbers and a Baby"	Dan Riba	Sean Roche and David Ehrman	October 2, 1989	192-010
Pam Matteson arrives in tears after losing her dog and asks Mario and Luigi to help get it back. Princess Toadstool falls into Koopa's Fountain of Youth and gets turned into a baby. Now Mario, Luigi and Toad must babysit her until they can find a way to get her back to her normal state. The episode's plot is based upon the film Three Men and a Baby.
22	"Plumbers of the Year"	Dan Riba	Perry Martin	October 3, 1989	192-022
22	"The Adventures of Sherlock Mario"	Dan Riba	Perry Martin	October 3, 1989	192-022
The Grand Pooba of Plumbing (Marty Allen) arrives to announce Mario and Luigi have been elected Plumbers of the Year. Mario becomes a detective to find the missing Herlock Solmes, and to stop Koopa from flooding the city of Victoria. The episode's plot is based upon the British legendary detective Sherlock Holmes.
23	"Mario Hillbillies"	Dan Riba	J. Larry Carroll and David Bennett Carren	October 4, 1989	192-030
23	"Do You Princess Toadstool Take this Koopa...?"	Dan Riba	J. Larry Carroll and David Bennett Carren	October 4, 1989	192-030
Mario and Luigi's hillbilly cousins Mario Joe (also portrayed by Albano) and Luigi Bob (also portrayed by Wells) make themselves too much at home and end up socializing with a girl named Ellie Mae (Donna Douglas). (Note: Spelt Ellie Mae in the credits, not Elly May like on The Beverly Hillbillies.) In order to free the Super Mario Bros. and the Mushroom People, Princess Toadstool agrees to marry Koopa, which would make him the legal ruler of the Mushroom Kingdom.
24	"Super Plant"	Dan Riba	Phil Harnage	October 5, 1989	192-025
24	"The Pied Koopa"	Dan Riba	Phil Harnage	October 5, 1989	192-025
Mario and Luigi use a plant growing antidote presented by a salesman (Gary Schwartz) to use on Mario's mother's dying plant (performed by Patrick Dempsey). Koopa uses a flute to lure all the children of Pastaland into his castle.
25	"Fred Van Winkle"	John Grusd	Bob Forward	October 6, 1989	192-057
25	"Sing for the Unicorn"	John Grusd	Bob Forward	October 6, 1989	192-057
Mario and Luigi meet Fred Van Winkle (Norman Fell), a man who has just woken up after sleeping for 60 years. Link's plans to romantically deliver flowers to Zelda are dashed when Ganon appears, attacking on the back of a unicorn. He kidnaps the king and they go to rescue him, meeting Sing, a woman from whom the unicorn had been stolen. Together they must face Ganon's traps, and rescue both the unicorn and the king from Ganon's capture.
26	"Baby Mario Love"	Dan Riba	Phil Harnage	October 9, 1989	192-034
26	"Koopenstein"	Dan Riba	Phil Harnage	October 9, 1989	192-034
When the rest of her band is unavailable due to their flight being late, Susanna Ross (Regina Williams) stops by and asks the Mario Bros. to act as backup singers. Koopa tries to terrorize a mountain town with a robot monster, but winds up turning into a monster himself. The episode's plot is based upon the novel Frankenstein.
27	"9001: A Mario Odyssey"	Dan Riba	Tony Marino	October 10, 1989	192-027
27	"On Her Majesty's Sewer Service"	Dan Riba	Tony Marino	October 10, 1989	192-027
Einstein (Ed Metzger) installs HAL 9001 (a parody of HAL 9000 from Space Odyssey, voiced by Phillip Clark), a pizza-making machine for the Mario Brothers, which malfunctions. Mario and Luigi become spies to save Secret Agent James Blonde from Koopfinger. The episode's plot is based upon the film On Her Majesty's Secret Service.
28	"Fake Bro"	Dan Riba	Michael A. Medlock and David Tischman	October 11, 1989	192-019
28	"Mario and Joliet"	Dan Riba	Michael A. Medlock and David Tischman	October 11, 1989	192-019
A schemer named Pietro (Vic Dunlop), in order to get rich quick, pretends to be Mario and Luigi's missing brother. Romano and Joliet are unable to get married due to the feud going on between their fathers, which Koopa secretly started. The episode's plot is based upon the Shakespearean play Romeo and Juliet.
29	"Time Out Luigi"	Dan Riba	Peter Norris and Brad Wilson	October 12, 1989	192-020
29	"Too Hot to Handle"	Dan Riba	Peter Norris and Brad Wilson	October 12, 1989	192-020
Luigi buys a watch that runs backwards from a mysterious salesperson named Angelica (Nedra Volz). Koopa and Fryguy use a fake volcano god to trick a tribe of islanders into sacrificing Princess.
30	"Tutti Frutti, Oh Mario"	John Grusd	Dennis O'Flaherty	October 13, 1989	192-058
30	"That Sinking Feeling"	John Grusd	Dennis O'Flaherty	October 13, 1989	192-058
When singer Little Robert (Willard Pugh) comes to visit, Luigi attempts to secretly record him singing. After a romantic picnic is ruined by Ganon, Zelda resolves to lay an assault on his lair, but as soon as they leave, the castle, along with the king and Spryte are pulled underground by a giant magnet and they need instead to rescue their friends before Ganon finds them.
31	"Flower Power"	Dan Riba	Mark McCorkle and Robert Schooley	October 16, 1989	192-023
31	"Hooded Robin and His Mario Men"	Dan Riba	Mark McCorkle and Robert Schooley	October 16, 1989	192-023
A taste of spaghetti sauce with seeds in it causes Luigi to grow fruits and vegetables out of his body. Mario's group teams up with Hooded Robin to reclaim all the gold coins that the Sheriff of Koopingham (Koopa) stole from a village. The episode's plot is based upon the British legendary outlaw Robin Hood.
32	"Vampire Until Ready"	Dan Riba	J. Larry Carroll and David Bennett Carren	October 17, 1989	192-032
32	"20,000 Koopas Under the Sea"	Dan Riba	J. Larry Carroll and David Bennett Carren	October 17, 1989	192-032
When a bat infests Mario Brothers Plumbing, an exterminator (Jim Ward) is called to deal with it. Koopa scares a seaside town into making him their ruler by using a mechanical sea monster to scare them. The episode's plot is based on the 1954 film 20,000 Leagues Under the Sea.
33	"Heart Throb"	Dan Riba	Brooks Wachtel	October 18, 1989	192-029
33	"Mighty McMario and the Pot of Gold"	Dan Riba	Brooks Wachtel	October 18, 1989	192-029
Rob Stone asks to stay with the Mario Bros. to hide from a mob of fans. Mario and friends must end a leprechaun's curse of bad luck by retrieving his pot of gold coins that was stolen by Koopa.
34	"Fortune Teller"	Dan Riba	Perry Martin	October 19, 1989	192-018
34	"Mario Meets Koop-zilla"	Dan Riba	Perry Martin	October 19, 1989	192-018
Mario and Luigi, anxious to find out what prize they won in a sweepstakes, consult a fortune teller named Madame AGoGo (Kaye Ballard) for help. After eating Super Sushi, Koopa has grown enormous, and is terrorizing the city of Sayonara. The episode's plot is based on the film series Godzilla.
35	"The Magic Love"	John Grusd	Bob Forward & Eve Forward	October 20, 1989	192-060
35	"Doppelganger"	John Grusd	Bob Forward & Eve Forward	October 20, 1989	192-060
Mario uses a magic apple to make singer Mad Donna (Paula Irvine) fall in love with him. Zelda receives a magic mirror which suddenly creates an evil double of her. With the real Zelda kidnapped, the fake is tasked to trick Link into taking the Triforce of Wisdom into the underworld, where it will be easy for Ganon to capture.
36	"Little Marios"	Dan Riba	Jack Olesker and Perry Martin	October 23, 1989	192-040
36	"Koopa Klaus"	Dan Riba	Jack Olesker and Perry Martin	October 23, 1989	192-040
When a runaway boy named Brian (Brian Bonsall) plans to stay with the Marios, the brothers recall a time in their youth. Koopa kidnaps Santa Claus in order to ruin Christmas, and Princess Toadstool is angry at Toad for seemingly caring about his snowboard more than wanting to save Santa.
37	"Gorilla My Dreams"	Dan Riba	John Vornholt and Steve Robertson	October 24, 1989	192-028
37	"Mario and the Red Baron Koopa"	Dan Riba	John Vornholt and Steve Robertson	October 24, 1989	192-028
A gorilla (Craig Armstrong) escapes from the circus and winds up invading Mario Brothers Plumbing. Mario and Luigi take to the skies to stop Koopa and Lakitu from taking over Pastaland, with the help of a used magic carpet salesman whom Koopa had recently robbed.
38	"George Washington Slept Here"	Dan Riba	Perry Martin	October 25, 1989	192-036
38	"The Unzappables"	Dan Riba	Perry Martin	October 25, 1989	192-036
Mario and Luigi want to turn their apartment into a bed and breakfast, and pretend that George Washington (Ed Metzger) was once a guest. Koopa and his henchmen acquire special hats which render them invulnerable. The plot of this episode is based on the TV series The Untouchables.
39	"Caught in a Draft"	Dan Riba	Kevin O'Donnell and Cassandra Schafhausen	October 26, 1989	192-026
39	"Bad Rap"	Dan Riba	Kevin O'Donnell and Cassandra Schafhausen	October 26, 1989	192-026
Mario and Luigi discover that they have been drafted by the military and Sgt. Slaughter shows up to train them. Koopa takes over Rap Land and hypnotizes everyone into giving him their money.
40	"Defective Gadgetry"	John Grusd	Bob Forward	October 27, 1989	192-059
40	"Underworld Connections"	John Grusd	Bob Forward	October 27, 1989	192-059
Inspector Gadget (Maurice LaMarche) comes to the Mario Brothers for emergency repairs. Link's sleepwalking is put to a stop before he can sneak into Zelda's bedroom chamber, but with the tower the Triforce is in is unguarded. A trio of Vires use a bomb to shatter the Triforce into three pieces to carry. They obtain one piece, and Zelda uses it in order to seek clues where the other two have been dropped, they venture into the Underworld to reunite the Triforce again.
41	"Toupee"	Dan Riba	Jack Olesker	October 30, 1989	192-031
41	"The Mark of Zero"	Dan Riba	Jack Olesker	October 30, 1989	192-031
Inspector Kleen (Gary Schwartz) from the board of sanitation comes to inspect Mario Brothers Plumbing. A Zorro-like hero saves Mario's group from Koopa. Mario and Luigi then have to save the mysterious hero from Koopa themselves.
42	"The Artist"	Dan Riba	Perry Martin	October 31, 1989	192-041
42	"The Ten Koopmandments"	Dan Riba	Perry Martin	October 31, 1989	192-041
Vincent Van Gook (Larry Gelman) arrives to give Luigi art lessons. Koopa has turned almost everyone in Pyramid Land into bricks for his new Koopinx, so Mario's group must find a way to rescue them. The episode is based on the film The Ten Commandments.
43	"Zenned Out Mario"	Dan Riba	Ted Pedersen	November 1, 1989	192-033
43	"The Koopas are Coming! The Koopas are Coming!"	Dan Riba	Ted Pedersen	November 1, 1989	192-033
When Tulio "the Wrench" becomes angry with Mario for asking his sister out, the brothers turn to help from Obi-Wan Cannoli (Arsenio Trinidad). Mario and co. help General Washingtoad free his Mushroom People from Koopa's Redcoats. The episode is based on Paul Revere's midnight ride.
44	"Texas Tea"	Dan Riba	Mark McCorkle and Robert Schooley	November 2, 1989	192-037
44	"The Trojan Koopa"	Dan Riba	Mark McCorkle and Robert Schooley	November 2, 1989	192-037
The Marios strike oil and try to sell it to Ted Bull (Norman Fell). When Mario, Luigi and Toad are unable to rescue Princess Toadstool from Koopa and the Hammer Brothers, they try to fool him with a Koopa-shaped Trojan Horse.
45	"The Great Hereafter"	John Grusd	Bob Forward	November 3, 1989	192-061
45	"Stinging A Stinger"	John Grusd	Bob Forward	November 3, 1989	192-061
Mario starts having strange visions of his grandmother, and he asks the Old Psychic Lady with the Evil Eye Who Reads Fortunes and Knows Everything Before it Happens (Elaine Kagan) for answers. Sleazenose, a traveling merchant, is rescued by Link who stops bandits from robbing him, and in gratitude, he gives Link a beautiful bejeweled sword in exchange for his current one. Using it in battle, Link realizes the sword is a fake and he and Zelda are kidnapped. They find they need to work together with Sleazenose to outwit Ganon once again.
46	"The Painting"	Dan Riba	Martha Moran	November 6, 1989	192-035
46	"Quest for Pizza"	Dan Riba	Martha Moran	November 6, 1989	192-035
Mario and Luigi find a lost painting. Mario gets bitten by a venomous snake in Cavemanland. Luigi, Princess Toadstool and Toad learn that the only way to save him is to feed him a pizza, which they must make from scratch.
47	"Game Show Host"	Dan Riba	J. Larry Carroll and David Bennett Carren	November 7, 1989	192-043
47	"The Great Gold Coin Rush"	Dan Riba	J. Larry Carroll and David Bennett Carren	November 7, 1989	192-043
Game show host Jim Lange comes to visit after a bonk on Luigi's head leads him to start acting like a game show host. When Mario's group accidentally discovers a cavern full of gold coins, Koopa finds out and forces the local villagers and Toad to mine them all for himself.
48	"Home Radio"	Dan Riba	J. Larry Carroll and David Bennett Carren	November 8, 1989	192-039
48	"Elvin Lives"	Dan Riba	J. Larry Carroll and David Bennett Carren	November 8, 1989	192-039
When the Marios win a contest, they must appear on Willy White's (Gary Owens) radio show the next day. While trying to find the missing Elvin Parsley, Koopa kidnaps Princess Toadstool and forces her to be his girlfriend.
49	"Glasnuts"	Dan Riba	Martha Moran	November 9, 1989	192-046
49	"Plummers Academy"	Dan Riba	Martha Moran	November 9, 1989	192-046
Soviet general secretary Mikhail Gorbachev (Martin Gardner) comes to Mario Brothers Plumbing after hearing they make the best pizza. Mario retells the story of how he and Luigi became plumbers back in Brooklyn. The episode's title is a reference to the Police Academy film series. Note: This episode originally featured Huey Lewis and the News' cover "Workin' for a Livin'" during its original time slot, which was deemed too inappropriate for this show due to its use of profanity.
50	"Treasure of the Sierra Brooklyn"	John Grusd	Bob Forward	November 10, 1989	192-062
50	"Hitch in the Works"	John Grusd	Bob Forward	November 10, 1989	192-062
Mario and Luigi find a map leading to treasure somewhere in Mario Brothers Plumbing. Not believing a story Link told her of Moblins attacking the castle when she found him unconscious and "sleeping" when he is supposed to be doing chores, Link has the house maintenance man make fake Moblins to attack her. She overhears the plan and does not react when the real Moblins come to kidnap her. Ganon puts a collar on her to force her to do his bidding, including marry him.
51	"Adee Don't"	Dan Riba	David Schwartz	November 13, 1989	192-038
51	"Karate Koopa"	Dan Riba	David Schwartz	November 13, 1989	192-038
Mario and Luigi try to record a commercial for their plumbing business with singer Tawny Tyler (a parody of real-life singer Bonnie Tyler and played by Melanie Chartoff), but Mario is nervous. When Koopa kidnaps Princess Toadstool and Toad, Mario and Luigi turn to a karate master for help.
52	"Chippie Chipmunks"	Dan Riba	Mark McCorkle and Robert Schooley	November 14, 1989	192-044
52	"Mario of the Apes"	Dan Riba	Mark McCorkle and Robert Schooley	November 14, 1989	192-044
Mario sets out to perform a series of tasks for Mr. Gibbel (Fred Travalena) of the Chippie Chipmunks to earn their "Chipmunk of the Month" award. While trying to catch Koopa in Jungleland, Mario suffers from amnesia, and is convinced by an ape couple that he is their child. The episode's plot is based upon the novel Tarzan of the Apes.
53	"A Basement Divided"	Dan Riba	J. Larry Carroll and David Bennett Carren	November 15, 1989	192-047
53	"Princess, I Shrunk the Mario Brothers"	Dan Riba	J. Larry Carroll and David Bennett Carren	November 15, 1989	192-047
Luigi is upset with Mario for not cleaning up after himself. Gary Schwartz guest stars as psychotherapist Doc Floyd. A wizard's potion intended to shrink Koopa is spilled by Toad, and ends up shrinking the Super Mario Bros instead. The episode's plot is based upon the film Honey, I Shrunk the Kids.
54	"No Way to Treat a Queenie"	Dan Riba	Jack Olesker	November 16, 1989	192-052
54	"Little Red Riding Princess"	Dan Riba	Jack Olesker	November 16, 1989	192-052
Queen Elizabeth II (Vicki Bakken) is sick of being treated like royalty, so she visits Mario Brothers Plumbing. Princess Toadstool is delivering a basket of cake, soup and apple cider to Grandma Toadstool, but she is pursued by both Koopa and the Big Bad Wolf. The episode's plot is based upon the fairytale of Little Red Riding Hood.
55	"Pizza Crush"	John Grusd	Bob Forward and Marsha Forward (Note: Bob and Eve's mother Martha is credited as Marsha Forward for the episode.)	November 17, 1989	192-063
55	"Fairies in the Spring"	John Grusd	Bob Forward and Marsha Forward	November 17, 1989	192-063
A pizza delivery girl named Jodie (Eve Plumb) keeps bringing Mario pizzas he did not order. The king is having a water park constructed to help his subjects cool off in the summer heat, when water monsters attack the construction crew. Zelda and Link investigate, but are startled to find the water monster does not belong to Ganon. When the King arrives to check their progress and while inspecting the pools of the water park, another monster pulls him in and vanishes. The pair collect the Triforce of Wisdom and return to the waterpark to find the King and the source of the disturbances.
56	"Goodbye Mr. Fish"	Dan Riba	Mark McCorkle and Robert Schooley	November 20, 1989	192-042
56	"The Provolone Ranger"	Dan Riba	Mark McCorkle and Robert Schooley	November 20, 1989	192-042
Mario and Luigi must babysit a fish for a fox hunter (Nedra Volz). When Koopa kidnaps Luigi, Princess Toadstool and Toad in Sudden Death Valley, Mario becomes the Provolone Ranger in order to save them. The episode's plot is based upon the TV series The Lone Ranger.
57	"French"	Dan Riba	Phil Harnage	November 21, 1989	192-051
57	"Escape from Koopatraz"	Dan Riba	Phil Harnage	November 21, 1989	192-051
Luigi attempts to learn French in order to sound classier. Posing as a judge, Koopa sentences Mario and Co to the prison of Koopatraz, where he is also the warden. Toad also finds his long lost grandfather. The episode's plot is based upon the film Escape from Alcatraz.
58	"Two Bums from Brooklyn"	Dan Riba	Perry Martin	November 22, 1989	192-016
58	"Mario of the Deep"	Dan Riba	Perry Martin	November 22, 1989	192-016
Mario and Luigi's baseball skills and meatballs fail to impress Brooklyn Dodgers manager Tummy Lasagna (a parody of then-Los Angeles Dodgers manager Tommy Lasorda and played by Joe Bellan). Mario's group tries to save Aqualand from Koopa's reign.
59	"Opera"	Dan Riba	Martha Moran	November 23, 1989	192-048
59	"Flatbush Koopa"	Dan Riba	Martha Moran	November 23, 1989	192-048
The Marios become fed-up with the singing of would-be opera singer Mrs. Gammliss (voiced by Karen Hartman), who lives in their apartment building. Mario and Luigi finally return to Brooklyn, only to learn that Koopa is taking over the city.
60	"Tutti Frutti Mario"	John Grusd	Bob Forward	November 24, 1989	192-065
60	"The Missing Link"	John Grusd	Bob Forward	November 24, 1989	192-065
When singer Little Robert comes to visit, Luigi attempts to secretly record him singing. Ganon tries to use a magic wand in order to kidnap Zelda, but she deflects the attack and it hits Link instead, sending his physical body to the Evil Jar. Her guilt is short lived after Link's spirit reveals himself to her, although no one else can see him. They realize that they need to travel into the underworld to reunite Link's spirit with his body trapped in the Evil Jar. Ganon is horrified when he deduces that the reason Zelda can see Link is because she is in love with him.
61	"Cyrano de Mario"	Dan Riba	Perry Martin	November 27, 1989	192-049
61	"Raiders of the Lost Mushroom"	Dan Riba	Perry Martin	November 27, 1989	192-049
A letter from an old friend named Roxanne (Vanna White) convinces Mario that she intends to marry him. Mario and Co. team up with the faceless Indiana Joe to try and recover a statue known as the Lost Mushroom. The episode's plot is based upon the film Raiders of the Lost Ark.
62	"Rowdy Roddy's Rotten Pipes"	Dan Riba	David Schwartz	November 28, 1989	192-045
62	"Crocodile Mario"	Dan Riba	David Schwartz	November 28, 1989	192-045
The brothers fix "Rowdy" Roddy Piper's bagpipes. When Koopa steals a town's magical statue that repels crocodiles, Mario and Luigi must retrieve it. The episode's plot is based upon the film Crocodile Dundee.
63	"Santa Claus is Coming to Flatbush"	Dan Riba	Phil Harnage	November 29, 1989	192-050
63	"Star Koopa"	Dan Riba	Phil Harnage	November 29, 1989	192-050
Santa Claus (Kort Falkenberg) appears at the Mario's home after his sled is stolen. Mario's group has to stop Koopa before he destroys the planet of a Mushroom space colony. The episode's plot is based upon the film Star Wars Episode IV: A New Hope.
64	"Captain Lou Is Missing"	Dan Riba	Kevin O'Donnell and Cassandra Schafhausen	November 30, 1989	192-013
64	"Robo Koopa"	Dan Riba	Kevin O'Donnell and Cassandra Schafhausen	November 30, 1989	192-013
Cyndi Lauper, waiting to go on a picnic with Captain Lou Albano, gets a note from him with an important part of the note accidentally torn out. Koopa uses a robotic suit to kidnap Princess Toadstool and Toad. The suit's inventor then builds Mario and Luigi a suit of their own so they can fight Koopa. The episode's plot is based upon the film series RoboCop.
65	"The Ghoul of My Dreams"	John Grusd	Eve Forward	December 1, 1989	192-064
65	"The Moblins Are Revolting"	John Grusd	Eve Forward	December 1, 1989	192-064
Luigi has a nightmare in which Mario and Elvira must battle a mummy. Ganon demonstrates a new wand that makes a bubble around its victim that can only be popped by the Triforce of Power. Fed up with Ganon's abuses, a Moblin uses the wand to trap Ganon in a bubble and throws him down a bottomless pit then usurps command. The Moblin opens the Evil Jar and the monsters collectively decide to storm the castle of Hyrule, but are too incompetent to accomplish anything without Ganon's leadership.

== The Adventures of Super Mario Bros. 3 ==
The following lists the animated episodes of The Adventures of Super Mario Bros. 3, in order of their original airdate.

No.	Title	Written by	Original release date	Prod. code
1	"Sneaky Lying Cheating Giant Ninja Koopas"	Bruce Shelly and Reed Shelly	September 8, 1990	217-102
1	"Reptiles in the Rose Garden"	Bruce Shelly and Reed Shelly	September 8, 1990	217-101
King Koopa uses a Magic Wand to turn Cheatsy, Bigmouth, Bully, and Kooky into giant Ninja Koopas so they can capture Prince Hugo the Huge of Giant Land and turn him into a miniature poodle. Kootie Pie Koopa hates all the elaborate presents her father and siblings supply at her Sweet Sixteen Birthday Party and demands that she be given Real World America as a gift.
2	"Mind Your Mummy Mommy, Mario"	Matt Uitz	September 15, 1990	217-104
2	"The Beauty of Kootie"	Doug Booth	September 15, 1990	217-107
Hip and Hop steal the golden mummy case of Prince Mushroom-khamen, a dead ringer for Mario, and awaken the wrath of Mommy Mummy Mushroomkhamen who tears up Desert Land in search of her kidnapped son. King Koopa is siphoning off all the oil from Desertland to power his doomship, but when his Koopalings mess up and cross the oil pipes with the water pipes, things get really sticky.
3	"Princess Toadstool for President"	Matt Uitz	September 22, 1990	217-110
3	"Never Koop a Koopa"	Martha Moran	September 22, 1990	217-116
Princess Toadstool is fed up with Koopa's antics and challenges him to try and win the Kingdom from her fair and square in a democratic election. Knowing that Koopa is too mean for anyone to vote for him, Kooky invents a potion to make Koopa nicer, winning over the citizens and threatening Toadstool's chances of winning the election. Koopa announces that he is giving up being bad for good. He cannot compete with the cleverness of the Princess and the Super Mario Brothers and as a gift of apology for his past behavior he gives the Princess the keys to Kastle Koopa.
4	"Reign Storm"	Steve Hayes and Ted Pedersen	September 29, 1990	217-103
4	"Toddler Terrors of Time Travel"	Rowby Goren	September 29, 1990	217-105
The Princess goes on her first vacation to the real world in Hawaii, leaving Mario and Luigi in charge of the Mushroom Kingdom. King Koopa and Kooky von Koopa travel back in time to prevent the Super Mario Brothers from discovering the Real World Brooklyn Warp Zone that first led them to the Mushroom Kingdom. Note: The featured song "Baby Face" from its original broadcast, parodied as "Baby Chase", has entered public domain in 2022 as a song written in 1926, despite being replaced by "Mega Move" for reruns while it was still copyrighted in the 1990s.
5	"Dadzilla"	Martha Moran	October 6, 1990	217-112
5	"Tag Team Trouble"	Martha Moran	October 6, 1990	217-117
Kootie Pie and Big Mouth are convinced they are much too beautiful to be adopted. They set out to find their "real" father - no doubt a movie star - in Hollywood. When Toad thinks he has lost the million gold coins the Princess had him deliver to the Mushroom Kingdom Orphanage, he desperately tries to recover the money by pitting his wrestling cousins, the Mushroom Marauder and Jake the Crusher Fungus, in a prize tag match against King Koopa's Sledge Brothers.
6	"Oh, Brother!"	Perry Martin	October 13, 1990	217-109
6	"Misadventure of Mighty Plumber"	Michael Maurer	October 13, 1990	217-108
When Mario and Luigi get fed up with each other, Luigi soon finds himself having to save his brother from King Koopa and Kooky. King Koopa brings TV hero Mighty Plumber to life and tricks him into robbing the Pipe Land Treasury.
7	"A Toadally Magical Adventure"	Doug Booth	October 20, 1990	217-106
7	"Misadventures in Babysitting"	Doug Booth	October 20, 1990	217-111
Toad loses a magic wand to the Koopa Troop. Mario and Luigi wind up babysitting a brat from Brooklyn who finds his way into the Mushroom Kingdom.
8	"Do the Koopa"	Phil Harnage	October 27, 1990	217-115
8	"Kootie Pie Rocks"	Martha Moran and Phil Harnage	October 27, 1990	217-113
Mario, Luigi, Toad, and Princess Toadstool seek the Doom Dancer Music Box in Koopa's Castle, but when the Koopas find out, they go after it themselves. Koopa kidnaps Milli Vanilli and forces them to perform exclusively for Kootie Pie. Note: This episode was broadcast just under three weeks before Milli Vanilli were exposed for lip-syncing. It was edited for subsequent broadcast owing to the scandal.
9	"Mush-Rumors"	Lee Schneider	November 3, 1990	217-120
9	"The Ugly Mermaid"	Perry Martin and Sean Roche	November 3, 1990	217-114
When a real world family drives into the Mushroom Kingdom, the Mushroom People and the Koopas mistake them for aliens. While wearing a Frog Suit, Mario almost drowns, but he is saved by Holly Mackerel, a mermaid princess. Holly falls in love with Mario and tries to marry him.
10	"Crimes R Us"	Heidi Holicker and Rick Holicker	November 10, 1990	217-118
10	"Life's Ruff"	Martha Moran	November 10, 1990	217-125
Koopa recruits a criminal from the Real World to teach the Koopalings how to commit crimes. Hip and Hop turn Luigi and the King of Ice Land into dogs and run off to cause mayhem in Florida. Note: This is the only episode of the animated series in which Mario is absent.
11	"Up, Up, and a Koopa"	Rowby Goren	November 17, 1990	217-119
11	"7 Continents for 7 Koopas"	Perry Martin	November 17, 1990	217-121
Kooky uses his new "Koopa-Doopa-Raiser Upper" machine to levitate everything in the Mushroom Kingdom to the sky. After trapping the Super Mario Bros. and Toad in the Mushroom World, Koopa orders his kids each to take over one of Earth's seven continents leaving Princess Toadstool to thwart his plans.
12	"True Colors"	Steve Fischer	November 24, 1990	217-122
12	"Recycled Koopa"	David Ehrman and Sean Roche	November 24, 1990	217-124
Kooky and Cheatsy use a special paint to turn all the Mushroom People either red or blue and trick the two colors into hating each other. When the Koopalings cannot get away with dumping their trash in the Mushroom Kingdom, they warp it all to Brooklyn. The Koopa garbage is turning the citizens into "Koopa Zombies", so Mario and Luigi must figure out a way to recycle it all and stop Koopa from turning Brooklyn into "Kooplyn".
13	"The Venice Menace"	Matt Uitz	December 1, 1990	217-126
13	"Super Koopa"	Doug Booth	December 1, 1990	217-123
King Koopa and Kootie Pie terrorize Venice with the Doom Sub to warp the city to Koopa Kastle and turn it into a water park for Kootie Pie. Kooky creates a magic pendant that grants King Koopa the ability to use power-ups like the Mario Bros., but it only works in the Real World. Koopa kidnaps Luigi to lure the others to Paris to defeat them.

== Super Mario World ==
The following lists the animated episodes of Super Mario World, in order of their original airdate.

No.	Title	Written by	Original release date	Prod. code
1	"Fire Sale"	Brooks Wachtel	September 14, 1991	402A
Kootie Pie steals Mama Fireplant, the source of the cave people's fire, and Mario, Luigi, Princess Toadstool and Yoshi must go to Ice Land, where Yoshi must overcome his fear of water to rescue his friends and save Mama Fireplant from being frozen forever.
2	"The Wheel Thing"	Eleanor Burian-Mohr and Jack Hanrahan	September 21, 1991	401A
Mario "invents" the wheel, and the Cave People discover traffic jams and fender benders. Frustrated, they banish Mario and Luigi to Lava Land. Then Kooky von Koopa builds a gigantic "Big Foot" drawn by evil dinosaurs which King Koopa uses to terrorize the hopelessly gridlocked Cave People until Mario and Luigi escape and come to the rescue.
3	"Send in the Clown"	Martha Moran	September 28, 1991	403A
To feed his hungry evil dinosaurs, King Koopa lures the cave people to a prehistoric circus at the Neon Castle with his Flying Clown Head and Mario, Luigi, Princess Toadstool and Yoshi must rescue them, but only Mario escapes King Koopa's diabolical trap. He must battle the Flying Clown Head to rescue everyone else from becoming dinosaur snacks.
4	"Ghosts 'R' Us"	Perry Martin	October 5, 1991	404A
A Koopa Wizard captures Mario, Luigi, Princess Toadstool as they search for Oogtar, a brash cave kid who's lost in the Enchanted Forest. The Wizard imprisons our heroes in the dungeon of a Ghost House, and Yoshi must brave real and imagined terrors to rescue them.
5	"The Night Before Cave Christmas"	Martha Moran and Phil Harnage	October 12, 1991	409A
Mario decides to bring Christmas to the Cave People. Luigi and Princess Toadstool make toys and wrap gifts, Mario dresses up as Santa Claus, and Yoshi pulls the "Cave-Sleigh". When King Koopa, Grinch-like, steals the bag with Oogtar inside, Mario must save Cave Christmas. Note: This was the only Super Mario World episode to be released on VHS in the US prior to 2007.
6	"King Scoopa Koopa"	Phil Harnage	October 19, 1991	405A
King Koopa opens a fast food stand serving Egg Scoopa Koopa sandwiches which are highly addictive, and turns his customers into Chickadactyls. Luckily, Mario hates eggs, so he does not eat any. It is up to him and Princess Toadstool to save Luigi, Yoshi and the cave people from becoming the main course in Koopa's newest culinary attraction: Fried Chickadactyl.
7	"Born to Ride"	Paul Dell and Steven Weiss	October 26, 1991	406A
After being scolded by Mario and Luigi, Yoshi runs away and joins a motorcycle-riding evil dinosaur gang who use him to kidnap the Super Mario Brothers for King Koopa. When Yoshi finds out he was being played for a sucker, he enlists the help of Princess Toadstool and they ride to the rescue, culminating in a wild motocross through Lava Land.
8	"Party Line"	Frank Ridgeway and Phil Harnage	November 2, 1991	407A
Mario invents the telephone so the Cave People will have a 911 line for emergencies, but the Cave People spend all their time talking on the phone, and Dome City starts to fall apart from neglect. They are oblivious to everything, even a rampaging evil dinosaur. Mario must put Ma Bell out of order permanently and defeat the dinosaur.
9	"Gopher Bash"	Brooks Wachtel	November 9, 1991	407B
Luigi teaches farming to the Cave People, with mixed results. When the crops grow, Cheatsy Koopa and a group of Monty Moles steal all the crops and put Fire Plants and Piranha Plants in their place. Luigi must go to Lava land to defeat the Gophers and recover the crops.
10	"Rock TV"	George Shea	November 16, 1991	408A
King Koopa invents television, and the Cave People are crazy about it. He sells them TV sets to watch at home, but each TV contains a Koopa Wizard that casts an evil spell over them. With the Cave People under his control, Koopa puts the Marios on TV as the fall guys in Dinosaur Wrestling. Note: This episode gained much notoriety when it aired for its depictions of television addiction. Then-President George H. W. Bush signed a deal to require educational content in children's programming by the guidelines of Children's Television Act before NBC ended the Saturday morning lineup in Summer 1992.
11	"The Yoshi Shuffle"	Kristofor Brown	November 23, 1991	408B
When Luigi is turned into an egg and Yoshi mistakes him for a football, Yoshi leads Mario on a madcap chase through Dinosaur World. When the Koopalings Bully and Cheatsy join in with Big Mouth as the host, it becomes the biggest, wildest football game of Mario's life. Yoshi catches on to the idea of teamwork and together, he and Mario save Luigi from being scrambled.
12	"A Little Learning"	Martha Moran	November 30, 1991	410A
Princess Toadstool starts a school with Yoshi and Oogtar, and Hip & Hop (over King Koopa's objections) as her first students. The kids become sworn enemies and their desire for revenge culminates in a disastrous science fair that threatens to blow up the entire Dinosaur World.
13	"Mama Luigi"	Phil Harnage	December 7, 1991	410B
Luigi tells Yoshi, in a flashback, how Luigi rescued Yoshi as an egg in the Dinosaur World, how Baby Yoshi thought Luigi was his mother, and how Baby Yoshi helped Luigi and Mario rescue Princess Toadstool from King Koopa. Note: This episode gained a cult following in later years, becoming one of the most popular sources for YouTube Poop remix videos. A reanimated collab version was released on YouTube in 2017.

== See also ==
- Captain N: The Game Master
- Donkey Kong Country (TV series)
