= Pasquale Carpino =

Canadian television chef

- Born: 1936; Cosenza, Calabria, Italy
- Died: December 30, 2005 (aged 69); Toronto, Ontario, Canada
- Culinary career
- Cooking style: Italian
- Television show(s): La Cucina Italiana con Pasquale, Pasquale's Kitchen, Pasquale's Kitchen Express

Pasquale Carpino (1936 – December 30, 2005) was a popular television chef in Toronto and an operatic singer.

== Early life ==
Born in the southern Italian province of Cosenza, Calabria in 1936, Pasquale immigrated to Toronto in 1958 at the age of 22, arriving alone with only a few dollars in his pocket. He was intensely passionate about music, most specifically opera. Pasquale met his wife Evelina, a soprano singer of Italian descent, in 1964. They had two daughters together, Beatrice and Lisa.

== Cooking career ==
Pasquale began his career in cooking as a dishwasher and prep cook at several restaurants located around the city of Toronto. With his dedication and talent for food, Chef Pasquale eventually became a chef and later a restaurateur. While continuing to progress his cooking career Pasquale studied opera at the Royal Conservatory of Music.

== Television ==
Pasquale's original cooking show played on local Toronto television in the late 1970s. He hosted La Cucina Italiana con Pasquale on CHIN television during Johnny Lombardi's Sunday Italian programming on CITY-TV, Global Television and Rogers Cable's community chanel. Later Pasquale was the host of popular cooking shows in the 1980s and early 1990s by the names of Pasquale's Kitchen and Pasquale's Kitchen Express. His trademark outfit was a blue smock, a white necktie and a red chef's toque. Pasquale engaged the audience in his cooking while singing at the same time. The food prepared on the show was for the most part Italian, usually consisting of an appetizer, entree, and dessert. The episode would usually end with Pasquale pouring wine and serving his dinner to an audience member. He developed a cult following in Toronto and was parodied by Tony Rosato's Chef Marcello character on SCTV.

== Technique ==
Pasquale's cooking technique focused on quick full multi-course meals. In different episodes he quoted a different time allotted for his four-course meal: 18.5 minutes to 22 minutes.

The meals were composed of several dishes: one for carbohydrate (usually pasta or risotto), another for protein (chicken, meat, or fish), and two of each of an appetizer (e.g., frittata), a dessert, a soup, or salad.

The meat dish is usually made using a pan-grilled method: grilling the meat on both sides in a little olive oil, then adding the sauce composed of chopped vegetables (such as mushrooms, potatoes, zucchini, onions, garlic, parsley, and celery, which are steam sauteed in a separate pan), then adding either 35% cream or tomato paste. The sauce was always added to the meat pan, so in the process deglazing it.

The pasta/rice dish was made with a similar sauce, but the pasta/rice added to the sauce instead of the other way round.

In both sauces, he would add broth from a pan beside the stove top.

On rare occasions, Pasquale would use the oven, for example, when cooking roast veal, rigatoni, or focaccia bread.

== Quotations ==
Pasquale would often repeat certain quotes while he cooked, such as:

- If you sing to the food, then it will come out good.
- The pasta should not wait for the sauce, the sauce can wait for the pasta.
- Watch out for your eye lashes when you flambee.
- When a little girl would flip the frittata successfully, she is ready to be courted to get married.
- Do not use milk in the sauce instead of 35% cream, otherwise we make ricotta.
- The best cooking is what the mama cooks
- If the pasta stays for a long time in the boiling water, it will become polenta
- Excuse my back (he always says it when turning around to drain the pasta).
- You want some more? (usually when he is adding cheese to the pasta or rice dish, then adds some more, then either pours the entire container of cheese, or puts it aside saying you can add to your dish).
- May everyone in the world, specially the little ones [i.e. children], have a meal like this
- Mamma mia! We should say Papà mio sometimes.
- I believe cooking is art, fantasy and vocation.
- You can repeat a recipe, but I cannot repeat a recipe.
- There are three things in the world you cannot repeat exactly the same: sing a song, sign your name, and a recipe.

== Legacy ==
Pasquale's fame is due greatly to the fact that he was one of the first celebrity chefs in Canada. Known as the Singing Chef, Pasquale once said :

If I sing when I cook, the food is going to be happy.

Pasquale Carpino died December 30, 2005, of complications from surgery.

Pasquale's Kitchen Express continued on air in re-runs on OMNI.1 and Citytv in Toronto.
