= Dan Hennessey =

American-born Canadian voice actor (1942–2024)

- Born: Daniel Robert Hennessey; September 11, 1942; New Jersey, U.S.
- Died: November 13, 2024 (aged 82); Kitchener, Ontario, Canada
- Education: Fairleigh Dickinson University
- Occupation: Voice actor
- Years active: 1960s–2005

Daniel Robert Hennessey (September 11, 1942 – November 13, 2024) was an American-born Canadian voice actor. He was best known for voicing Brave Heart Lion in the Care Bears franchise.

In addition to his well-received voice work in Care Bears, he provided the voice for Father Bear in Little Bear, Chief Quimby in Inspector Gadget, George Raccoon and Train Engineer Sid in The Raccoons, Thomson in The Adventures of Tintin, Bully Koopa in The Adventures of Super Mario Bros. 3 and Super Mario World, Zed and Tackleberry in Police Academy and Genghis Rex in Dinosaucers. Aside from voice acting, he was a voice director for the animated Fox Kids superhero television series X-Men and CBS children's television series Blaster's Universe, and was originally a part of the comedy troupe Zoo Factory along with Hariet Cohen, John Stocker, Bruce Gordon and Jerelyn Homer.

Hennessey died on November 13, 2024, from complications of Parkinson's disease in Kitchener, Ontario, at the age of 82.
