= The Super Mario Bros. Super Show! =

1989 American TV series

- Genre: Fantasy; Comedy; Adventure
- Created by: Andy Heyward
- Based on: Super Mario Bros., Super Mario Bros. 2, and The Legend of Zelda by Nintendo
- Developed by: Bruce Shelly; Reed Shelly; Bob Forward; Phil Harnage
- Directed by: Dan Riba (Super Mario Bros. segments); John Grusd (The Legend of Zelda segments)
- Starring: Lou Albano; Danny Wells
- Voices of: Lou Albano; Danny Wells; Jeannie Elias; Harvey Atkin; John Stocker; Jonathan Potts; Cyndy Preston; Len Carlson; Paulina Gillis
- Theme music composer: Haim Saban; Shuki Levy
- Opening theme: "Mario Brothers Rap"
- Ending theme: "Do the Mario"
- Composers: Haim Saban; Shuki Levy
- Country of origin: United States
- Original language: English
- No. of seasons: 1
- No. of episodes: 65 (list of episodes)

Production
- Executive producers: Andy Heyward; Robby London
- Producer: John Grusd
- Camera setup: Multi-camera
- Running time: 20–22 minutes
- Production companies: DIC Enterprises (Note: Animation outsourced to Sei Young Animation.); Nintendo of America

Original release
- Network: Syndication
- Release: September 4 – December 1, 1989

Related
- King Koopa's Kool Kartoons (1989); The Adventures of Super Mario Bros. 3 (1990); Super Mario World (1991)

The Super Mario Bros. Super Show! is an American live-action/animated television series that aired from September 4 to December 1, 1989, in syndication. The series is based on the video games Super Mario Bros. and Super Mario Bros. 2 by Japanese multinational video game company Nintendo and Shigeru Miyamoto, and is the first of three television series to be based upon the Mario video game series. The animation was provided by South Korean company Sei Young Animation.

Each episode consists of a live-action "Mario Bros. Plumbing" segment and an animated segment. The live-action segments feature WWE Hall of Fame wrestler/manager "Captain" Lou Albano as Mario and Danny Wells as Luigi alongside a special guest, either as themselves or a character for the segment. The animated segment in Monday through Thursday episodes is a Super Mario Bros. segment, starring the voices of Albano and Wells in their respective roles, and the segment in Friday episodes is a The Legend of Zelda segment.

A sequel series based on Super Mario Bros. 3 aired the following year, followed by another show based on Super Mario World the year after that.

== Premise ==
The Super Mario Bros. Super Show! revolves around Mario and Luigi, two Italian American plumbers from Brooklyn. The live-action "Mario Bros. Plumbing" segments, set in Mario and Luigi's apartment in Brooklyn, parody contemporary sitcom episodes.

The Super Mario Bros. animated segments feature Mario and Luigi after they accidentally warp into the Mushroom Kingdom while fixing a bathtub drain. Each episode begins with Mario reciting an entry into his "Plumber's Log", then teaming up with Luigi to assist Princess Toadstool and Toad in preventing King Koopa from taking over the Kingdom with a sinister plot, generally one parodying a book, film, or historical event. Each episode's plot features characters and situations based upon the NES games Super Mario Bros. and Super Mario Bros. 2, as well as several sound effects and musical cues from both games. Despite being based on the games, some episodes feature inconsistencies between the series and the video games. For example, in the animated series, Mario receives fire powers from a Super Star, whereas the star grants temporary invincibility in the game, with the Fire Flower granting pyrokinesis.

The Legend of Zelda animated segments follow the adventures of the hero Link and Princess Zelda as they defend the kingdom of Hyrule from Ganon, who has somehow come into possession of the Triforce of Power. Most episodes consist of Ganon (or his minions) either attempting to capture the Triforce of Wisdom from Zelda, kidnap Zelda, or conquer Hyrule. In some episodes, Link and Zelda are assisted and accompanied by a fairy-princess named Spryte, who dislikes Zelda as she considers her to be a competitor for Link's affections. Throughout the series, Link is a moaning, self-centered teenager who repeatedly fails to convince Zelda that he deserves a kiss for his heroic deeds. Although Zelda is sometimes the damsel in distress, she is a headstrong, self-sufficient princess who is Link's equal. Link frequently meets Zelda's angry remarks with his sarcastic catchphrase, "Well, excuse me, Princess!"

== Cast ==
- Lou Albano as Mario (both live-action and animated)
- Danny Wells as Luigi (both live-action and animated)

=== Super Mario Bros. ===
- Jeannie Elias as Princess Toadstool
- John Stocker as Toad
- Harvey Atkin as King Koopa

=== The Legend of Zelda ===
- Jonathan Potts as Link
- Cyndy Preston as Princess Zelda
- Len Carlson as Ganon
- Paulina Gillis as Spryte
- Colin Fox as King Harkinian
- Elizabeth Hanna as the Triforce of Wisdom
- Allen Stewart Coates as the Triforce of Power

=== Live-action guest stars ===
- Marty Allen as Imperial Poobah
- Lyle Alzado
- Craig Armstrong as Frankenstein's Monster, Gorilla
- Vicki Bakken as Liz/"Queen of England"
- Kaye Ballard as Madam AGoGo
- Joe Bellan as Tummy Lasagna
- Harry Blackstone Jr. as the Magician
- Brian Bonsall
- Clare Carey as E.C.
- Melanie Chartoff as Tawny Tyler
- Philip L. Clarke as HAL 9001
- Patrick Dempsey as the Super Plant
- Shabba Doo
- Donna Douglas as Ellie Mae
- Vic Dunlop as Pietro
- Cassandra Peterson as Elvira
- Nicole Eggert
- Paul Elder as Alligator Dundee
- Kort Falkenberg as Santa Claus
- Norman Fell as Ted Bull, Fred Van Winkle
- Martin Garner as Mikhail S. Gorbachev
- Larry Gelman as Sigmund Fruitcake, Vincent van Gook
- Courtney Gibbs as Luigi's girlfriend
- Joseph S. Griffo as Mini Mario
- Karen Hartman as Patty's mother, voice of Mrs. Gammliss
- Andy Heyward as Howard Stevens
- David Horowitz as himself
- Ernie Hudson
- Paula Irvine as Mad Donna
- Magic Johnson
- Elaine Kagan as the Old Psychic Lady
- Jim Lange
- Cyndi Lauper
- Maurice LaMarche as Edison, Inspector Gadget
- Eugene Liebowitz as Dr. Frankenstein
- Pam Matteson as Cher
- Danica McKellar as Patty
- Ed Metzger as Albert Einstein, George Washington, Ralph Washington
- Scott Nemes as Young MacDonald
- Gary Owens as Willy White
- "Rowdy" Roddy Piper
- Eve Plumb as Jodie
- Willard Pugh as Little Robert
- Gary Schwartz as Dr. Toby, Inspector Klean, Doc Freud
- Sgt. Slaughter
- Rob Stone
- Fred Travalena as Elvis Presley, Mr. Gibbel
- Arsenio Trinidad as Obi-Wan Cannoli
- Nedra Volz as Angelica, Fox Hunter
- James Ward as Patty's father, Count Zoltan Dracula, Exterminator
- Regina Williams as Susanna Ross
- Vanna White as Roxanne
- Moon Zappa as Marilyn

Albano also appears as himself in "Captain Lou Is Missing".

== Production ==
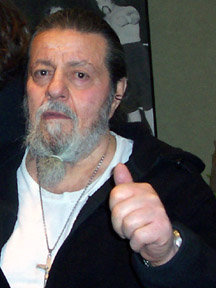
Lou Albano in 2009

=== History and development ===
Before the series was conceived, Andy Heyward, the then-CEO of DIC Enterprises, spent about a year trying to convince Nintendo to license the characters. In an interview with USA Today, Heyward said: "The Mario Bros. is such a unique property we had to do it in a different way...We wanted to do a cartoon but also do a show that extended beyond the cartoon". The project originated as Super Mario Bros. Power Hour, a one hour long animation block that would have featured series based on a number of intellectual properties. Concept art was produced for adaptations of Super Mario Bros., The Legend of Zelda, Metroid, Castlevania, Double Dragon, and California Games. With the exception of Mario and Zelda, none of these additional adaptations were ultimately produced, though elements of Metroid and Castlevania would appear in the series Captain N: The Game Master. Double Dragon would receive a later adaptation from DIC which aired from 1993 to 1994, but this did not make use of the 1980s concepts and was instead based on the SNES titles released in the interim.

The show premiered in September 1989. To promote the series, Lou Albano appeared on Live with Regis and Kathie Lee in May 1989 with his beard shaven. When the series first aired, it was distributed by Viacom Enterprises and was marketed by MTV. In addition, DiC planned to produce an animated film based on the series, to be released in the summer of 1990. The film was never produced, and a live-action adaptation was instead released in 1993.

In David Sheff's book Game Over, Bill White, the then-director of advertising and public relations for Nintendo, said that the purpose of the television series was to boost awareness of the characters.

The Legend of Zelda animation was only produced for one season. Writer Phil Harnage said that the reason it was cancelled was partly because it was tied to The Super Mario Bros. Super Show! rather than being its own show. He also said that the show received some letters from children asking for it to not be cancelled but this positive feedback was not enough to keep the show in production.

=== Format ===
Title card for Zelda segments

Each episode of the program consists of a live-action "Mario Bros. Plumbing" segment, the first half of which is shown before the animated segment; the second half is shown afterwards. These live-action segments feature Lou Albano and Danny Wells as Mario and Luigi, respectively, in a comedic story accompanied by a laugh track. These segments involve a celebrity guest star joining the pair, either as themselves or as a character connected to the segment's plot, often a popular television star or professional athlete (including WWE (then WWF) stars of the time). Guests include Nedra Volz, Norman Fell, Donna Douglas, Eve Plumb, Vanna White, Lyle Alzado and Magic Johnson.

Alongside guest stars, both Albano and Wells portray additional characters in a number of episodes related to Mario and Luigi. In one episode, Albano appears as himself, but Mario is absent, while in a number of episodes the pair are joined by Maurice LaMarche in the live-action role of the animated character Inspector Gadget (making it the first appearance of the character in live-action, predating the live-action film by ten years), before his eventual role in voicing the character in Inspector Gadget's Last Case and Gadget & the Gadgetinis. In an interview for Shout! Factory's first DVD release of the show in 2006 – which exclude some episodes that involved Cassandra Peterson as Elvira, alongside Gadget's second appearance and a few other episodes – Albano stated that filming of the live-action segments involved mainly he and Wells receiving a central plot and mostly improvising their dialogue. The live-action segments were directed by Steve Binder and were filmed before a studio audience.

The rest of the episode in-between the live-action segment is dedicated to animated serials. For the majority of episodes, originally aired between Monday and Thursday, each episode of The Super Mario Bros. Super Show! features an animated serial of the Super Mario Bros., in which both Albano and Wells voice their respective characters. A total of 52 serials aired under this schedule until November 16, 1989. For every episode that originally aired on a Friday, the animated segments consist of serials of The Legend of Zelda. A total of 13 serials were produced.

=== Writing ===
According to screenwriter Bob Forward, the writing team on the Legend of Zelda segments was given significant freedom to develop the series as they wished, particularly with regards to the script and character design. Nintendo offered little advice or guidance to the writers except for providing a franchise "bible", character designs, and the first two video games in the series. As a result, the writers, who were not gamers, conducted their own research and decided to focus on story instead of gameplay. The episodes featured a combination of action, drama and comedy, with much emphasis placed on the relationship between Zelda and Link.

The fairy character named Spryte was inspired by Forward's childhood obsession with the character Tinker Bell from Walt Disney's animated film Peter Pan. Forward also explained that Link's catchphrase "Excuse me, Princess" was based on a popular Steve Martin comedy routine. He decided to include it in every episode of the series as a way to poke fun at DIC's VP of Creative Affairs, Robbie London, who had forced him to use the phrase. Forward also stated that the relationship between Link and Zelda was influenced by the dynamic between the characters of David Addison and Maddie Hayes from the American television series Moonlighting, which were portrayed by Bruce Willis and Cybill Shepherd respectively.

The writers revealed that, in addition to having a "show bible" as a reference for the main characters, they were influenced by their own interests when creating episodes in the series. Eve Forward said that although the monsters and weapons were based on the game, "a lot of the various swashbuckling stuff I liked to put in was based on things that had happened in our D&D games".

The show is one of the few instances of Link having dialogue in The Legend of Zelda franchise. It was the first time that the characters were given voice actors, having never been voiced in the games and being composed of just a few pixels. This allowed the writers freedom of interpretation. Bob Forward said that "we very much made it up as we went along". The games intentionally do not give Link dialogue. The Legend of Zelda video game series producer Eiji Aonuma has explained that "since people have played Zelda over the years, they have their ideas of how Link might sound. If we were to put a voice in there that might not match up with someone else's image, then there would be a backlash to that. So we've tried to avoid that".

=== Songs ===
"Mario Brothers Rap"
"Mario Brothers Rap" is one of the theme songs for the show, the other being "Do the Mario".

Each episode features two main theme songs used during its broadcast:

- "Mario Brothers Rap" – composed by Haim Saban, Andrew Dimitroff and Shuki Levy, the theme is performed by unknown artists, one version to open the show, and another version before the Super Mario Bros. animated segments. Both versions are based on the original "Overworld" theme from the Super Mario Bros. video game. The song was later featured in The Super Mario Bros. Movie, performed by Ali Dee Theodore.
- "Do the Mario" – performed by Albano in front of a greenscreen of the animated show's backgrounds, it acts as the closing theme for The Super Mario Bros. Super Show!.

During each Super Mario Bros. animated segment, a cover of a popular song is played. When the program was re-released onto DVD in North America, these songs were replaced by instrumentals of seven songs from The Adventures of Super Mario Bros. 3 and one song from Super Mario World.

== Reruns ==
=== Club Mario ===
The first set of reruns of the program were aired during the 1990–1991 TV season, again in syndication, but with significant changes to the live-action format. While it retained the program's original scheduling arrangement of broadcasts and the animated Super Mario Bros. and The Legend of Zelda segments, the live-action "Mario Bros. Plumbing" segments were replaced by live-action "Club Mario" segments.

These segments feature stereotypical 1990s teenagers Tommy Treehugger and Co-MC, played by Chris Coombs and Michael Anthony Rawlins, respectively, hijacking the Super Show's satellite signal (in reality, tapes of the show were sent to stations well in advance). The two are regularly visited by Tommy's annoying sister Tammy (Victoria Delaney), the aptly named Dr. Know-It-All (Kurt Weldon), Co-MC's evil twin Eric (also Rawlins), and a guest star. The segment featured a one-to-two-minute viewing of Spaced Out Theater hosted by Princess Centauri (Shanti Kahn), which was sourced and edited from the children's science fiction television series Photon. In at least one episode, they harass Andy Heyward (playing himself) in the DiC offices.

Club Mario proved unpopular with viewers and was discontinued after one season. The show was reverted to its original format for further reruns.

==== Cast ====
- Chris Coombs as Tommy Treehugger
- Michael Anthony Rawlins as Co-MC/Evil Eric
- Kurt Weldon as Dr. Know-It-All
- Victoria Delaney as Tammy Treehugger
- Jeff Rose as The Big Kid
- James Abbott as The Band
- Shanti Kahn as Princess Centauri
- Andy Heyward as himself

=== Mario All Stars ===
The second set of reruns was created for The Family Channel in 1994 as a programming package entitled Mario All Stars, inspired by the video game title Super Mario All-Stars that was released the previous year. The format of the rerun focused on primarily the cartoons featured in The Super Mario Bros. Super Show! alongside those from the Super Mario World series. Prior to being re-edited for this package, the network aired reruns of the program (artificially slowed down due to removing The Legend of Zelda previews) including the original live-action segments before they were discontinued to make way to the package's layout. The package was rebroadcast by the USA Network from January 8 to June 6, 1997. The theme song was the end credits theme of Super Mario World. Although clips from The Adventures of Super Mario Bros. 3 were used in promos for the show, none of the show's episodes were featured.

=== Remastered version ===
The WildBrain remaster was criticized by some audiences for using AI upscaling. Here, the title was accidentally changed from "Super" to "Suele".

In 2026, the show's current rights owner, Canadian media holdings company WildBrain, remastered the series alongside a selection of other shows.

The remastered version made its television debut on MeTV Toons beginning on March 30, 2026, airing from Monday to Friday. Animation World Network noted that timing of series' release coincided with the theatrical release of The Super Mario Galaxy Movie on April 1 of the same year. Following the series' premiere on the network, it was widely panned for using botched AI upscaling. This included an accidental change in the title card from "Super", where it instead read "Suele". WildBrain later clarified that while the team behind the remasters did use AI for assistance, the errors were made due to the quality of the prints used and that they would correct any errors that the AI software would produce.

== Home media and streaming ==
From 1989 to 1990, Kids Klassics (with the sponsorship of Nesquik) released episodes of the series on VHS. Starting in 1991, Kids Klassics' parent company GoodTimes Entertainment continued releasing episodes on VHS up through 1993. These 1989 releases are noted for being the only releases to contain the original song covers.

In 1994, Buena Vista Home Video under their DIC Toon-Time Video label released the VHS Super Mario Bros. Super Christmas Adventures!, which contained the animated segment "Koopa Klaus" and the live-action segment "Santa Claus is Coming to Flatbush" alongside the Super Mario World episode "The Night Before Cave Christmas".

In 2002, Lions Gate Home Entertainment released a DVD titled Mario's Greatest Movie Moments, which contained six episodes as well as two episodes of The Legend of Zelda. The VHS versions of the DVD, Mario's Monster Madness and Action Adventures, include the same episodes (three per tape, alongside one Zelda episode). None of those releases contained any live-action segments.

In 2004, Sterling Entertainment released Mario Mania on DVD which contained the first week's episodes, consisting of four Mario segments and a Legend of Zelda episode. This release however featured the live-action segments and could also be watched on their own. A Question-and-answer with DIC CEO Andy Heyward was also included. Another DVD which consisted of five episodes, Mario's Movie Madness, was released by Sterling in 2005, but removed the live-action segments.

In 2006, Shout! Factory (distributed at the time by Sony BMG Music Entertainment) released the series on two 4-disc DVD sets.

DVD name	Ep #	Release date	Additional information
Mario's Greatest Movie Moments	8	2002	Trivia game (unlocks bonus episode)
Volume 1	24	28 March 2006	New interviews with Captain Lou Albano (Mario); Original art gallery; Storyboard-to-Screen: The Super Mario Bros. Super Show Opening Title Sequence
Volume 2	28	31 October 2006	4 bonus animated episodes; "Meeting Mario: A Fan's Tale" Featurette; Super Mario Bros. Fan Costume Gallery; The Worlds of The Super Mario Bros. Super Show! Concept Art Galleries; Interactive Tour Of The Mario Bros. Plumbing

These two sets were discontinued in 2012 after Shout!'s deal with Cookie Jar Group expired.

From 2007 to 2009, NCircle Entertainment released several DVD sets of the series. The prints used on these releases were taken from the Shout! Factory boxsets.

NCircle re-released the complete sets in 2012 with the same extras as the Shout! Factory sets, but with the live-action segments removed and "On Her Majesty's Sewer Service" excluded. These releases have the DIC logo replaced with the then-current Cookie Jar logo.

In July 2012, the show was added to Netflix as a part of their instant streaming library. The show was later removed from the service in May 2021.

As of 2020, the series can be purchased digitally to own on VUDU, which is owned by Fandango Media.

The show is available to stream on Amazon Prime Video, Tubi, Pluto TV, and The Roku Channel.

=== UK home media history ===
From 1991 to 1993, Abbey Home Entertainment Distribution released six videos of the "Super Mario Bros. Super Show" with only the animated segmented episodes, the animated segmented intro and the live-action segment of "Do the Mario" in the closing credits.

Maximum Entertainment (under license from Fox Kids Europe/Jetix Europe) released 4 DVD sets of the series from 2004 to 2007. The first and fourth sets contained 6 episodes, the second contained 5 and the third set contained 3 episodes.

=== Australia home media history ===
Beyond Home Entertainment released a six-disc box set in 2013, with two segments "Rolling Down the River" and "The Unzappables" omitted.

=== Germany home media history ===
Pidax has released the complete series along The Legend of Zelda in Germany (with English audio included), in five boxsets, but unlike some English releases the missing live-action episodes are included (though only in German). These DVDs included all extras except the interactive DVD games.

=== The Legend of Zelda on home media ===
The Legend of Zelda series has been released separately from the Mario content multiple times, first by Kids Klassics, who released the series on two-episode tapes in four volumes; the gold color of the VHS slipcases matched that of the original NES games.

Lions Gate Home Entertainment also included an episode each on their "Mario's Monster Madness" and "Action Adventures" VHSes; both are also included on their DVD counterpart "Mario's Greatest Movie Moments".

Sterling Entertainment released another VHS/DVD titled Ganon's Evil Tower on July 22, 2003, which included three episodes. The DVD release also included 2 episodes of Sonic Underground as a bonus. The second DVD was released on September 27, 2005, titled Havoc in Hyrule, containing five episodes.

The complete Zelda series was released on October 18, 2005, by Shout! Factory and Sony BMG Music Entertainment, with extra bonus features such as interactive DVD games and line art from the series, but it did not include all of the associated the Super Mario Bros. Super Show! live action segments; some were included as bonus features. This release has been discontinued and is out of print.

NCircle Entertainment eventually re-released Sterling's DVDs, and released another one titled "The Power of the Triforce" on July 22, 2008, which contains five episodes. NCircle re-released the complete series on May 2012.

== Reception ==
=== Critical response ===
The show was met with generally mixed reviews from critics, who were critical of its animation, humor, live-action segments, storylines, and Albano and Wells' acting. Upon the series premiere in September 1989, Mike Hughes of USA Today described the series as a "surprising disappointment", opining that the series had "little of the wit and spark" and relied too heavily on slapstick. In a retrospective review for the series' DVD, Mark Bozon of IGN referred to the series as "the biggest offender among Nintendo's many embarrassing moments" but thought that the animated shorts were "interesting to look back on". Bozon gave the overall series a 7 out of 10 (while giving the DVD itself a 5 out of 10). Joyce Slaton of Common Sense Media rated the show 1 out of 5 stars, stating that the stereotypically Italian aspects of the Mario Bros. on the show have not aged well.

==== The Legend of Zelda ====
The Legend of Zelda segments, when reviewed individually, have also received mixed-to-negative reception. IGN rated the DVD release of The Legend of Zelda a 3.0 out of 10, or "Bad", citing poor writing, repeated plots, and over the top acting. Link's catchphrase, "Well excuse me, Princess!" is an internet meme and commonly used in-joke used by video game players, especially Zelda fans, and is spoken by Link on 29 occasions throughout the 13 episodes.

Michael Mammano for Den of Geek commented that the series "falls squarely into the category of guilty pleasure" and continued that "it's not very good, but that doesn't stop it from being eminently enjoyable. It's quality nostalgia and, at a total running time of just over three hours, not a bad way to kill an afternoon". He described Link's characterisation as "appalling", and also considered the writing and animation to be of poor quality.

Nathan Simmons of SVG considered the animation to be "pretty stiff" but also opined that "the greatest sin of this cartoon series might be it's[sic] characterization of Link" who is portrayed as a "creep" and felt that "it was simply painful to watch".

Luke Plunkett of Kotaku noted "shoddy animation, poor voice work, execrable humour and terrible writing make it one of the decade's worst cartoons" but also commented that "for all its flaws, there's something about it that defies genuine ridicule. Something charming". He responded more positively to the show's faithful presentation of the artwork from the original The Legend of Zelda game and the music stating that it "featured great renditions of the game's most memorable music, especially the intro's version of the trademark title theme".

Dave Trumbore for Collider described the series as a "20th century mess" and commented: "Despite 30 years of beloved video games that have evolved with each of Nintendo's successive video game systems, the one-and-only 1989 animated series remains a blight on an otherwise impressive record. This disaster, and similar ill-fated animated/live-action adaptations of Nintendo's intellectual properties, left a foul taste in the IP-owners' mouths, essentially locking out any additional adaptations outside of the video game realm".

Writing for Destructoid, Chris Moyse commented that the series "was merely one more harmless entity in a thousand mediocre cartoons", but opined that it harmed the future potential of the franchise and wished for a new Legend of Zelda adaptation that was more faithful to the original games.

=== Ratings ===
Upon the first week of its premiere, the series had a cumulative 4.1/12 rating/share, making the series the highest rated first-run syndicated series at the time. Within the next two weeks, the series (3.8/11) was beat out by Buena Vista Television's Chip 'n Dale: Rescue Rangers (4.5/11) and faced competition with Claster Television's Muppet Babies reruns.
