= The Adventures of Super Mario Bros. 3 =

1990 animated TV series

- Genre: Action; Adventure; Comedy; Fantasy; Musical
- Based on: Super Mario Bros. 3 by Nintendo
- Developed by: Reed Shelly; Bruce Shelly
- Directed by: John Grusd
- Voices of: Walker Boone; Tony Rosato; Tracey Moore; John Stocker; Harvey Atkin; Dan Hennessey; Gordon Masten; Michael Stark; James Rankin; Paulina Gillis; Stuart Stone; Tara Strong
- Composer: Michael Tavera
- Countries of origin: United States; Italy
- No. of episodes: 13 (26 segments) (list of episodes)

Production
- Executive producers: Andy Heyward; Robby London
- Producer: John Grusd
- Running time: 23–24 minutes
- Production companies: DIC Animation City; Reteitalia S.p.A.; Nintendo of America

Original release
- Network: NBC (United States); Italia 1 (Italy)
- Release: September 8 – December 1, 1990

Related
- The Super Mario Bros. Super Show! (1989); King Koopa's Kool Kartoons (1989); Super Mario World (1991); Captain N: The Game Master (1990)

The Adventures of Super Mario Bros. 3 is an animated television series. It aired from September 8 to December 1, 1990, on NBC. It is the second animated series to be based on Nintendo's Mario video game series and is loosely based on the video game Super Mario Bros. 3. The animation was provided by Sei Young Animation.

== Overview ==
Unlike its predecessor, the series dropped the use of live-action segments, Wart's minions and King Koopa's alter-egos, featured an entirely new cast (with the exceptions of John Stocker and Harvey Atkin, who reprised their respective roles as Toad and King Koopa), established a level of continuity in stories, and introduced a set of characters called the Koopalings, based upon the same characters from the Mario games but with different names. Episodes were divided into two segments of around 11 minutes each, always opened by a title card featuring world-map footage taken from Super Mario Bros. 3, and often featured the use of power-ups and other elements from the game.

=== Format ===
The Adventures of Super Mario Bros. 3 focuses on Mario, Luigi, Toad, and Princess Toadstool, who reside in the Mushroom World. Most of the episodes revolve around the four characters' efforts to prevent the attacks made by King Koopa and the Koopalings to take over Princess Toadstool's Mushroom Kingdom.

Like The Super Mario Bros. Super Show!, the show was produced by DIC Animation City, with the overseas animation being done at the South Korean studio Sei Young Animation Co., Ltd., although the show was co-produced by Italian studio Reteitalia S.p.A.

Since the show was based on Super Mario Bros. 3, the enemies and power-ups were also seen in the show. In addition to being more faithful to Mario gameplay, the series was given an established sense of continuity, something that the previous series lacked. Many episodes are set on Earth (consistently referred to as "The Real World" by the characters) and are set in locations such as Brooklyn, London, Paris, Venice, New York City, Cape Canaveral, Miami, Los Angeles, and Washington, D.C. One episode titled "7 Continents for 7 Koopas" is about the Koopalings invading each of the seven continents.

This cartoon was originally shown in the hour-long Captain N and The Adventures of Super Mario Bros. 3 programming block along with the second season of Captain N: The Game Master on NBC, whose format involved having two Mario Bros. episodes with a full-length Captain N episode sandwiched in-between. All further airings of the series separated it from Captain N when Weekend Today aired in 1992. Also that year, it was included in Rysher Entertainment's Captain N & The Video Game Masters syndication package.

== Voice cast ==
The TV series entered production before official names were given to new characters in the development of the video game, so the Koopalings' names are all different.

- Walker Boone as Mario
- Tony Rosato as Luigi
- Tracey Moore as Princess Toadstool
- John Stocker as Toad
- Harvey Atkin as King Koopa
- James Rankin as Cheatsy (Larry) Koopa
- Dan Hennessey as Bully (Roy) Koopa
- Tabitha St. Germain (as Paulina Gillis) as Kootie Pie (Wendy O.) Koopa
- Gordon Masten as Big Mouth (Morton) Koopa
- Michael Stark as Kooky (Ludwig) von Koopa
- Stuart Stone as Hip (Lemmy) Koopa
- Tara Strong as Hop (Iggy) Koopa (credited as Tara Charendoff)

== Home media ==
=== North America ===
In 1994, Buena Vista Home Video released four VHS volumes of the series which each contained two episodes.

In 2003, Sterling Entertainment released a VHS/DVD titled King Koopa Katastrophe, which contained six episodes. The DVD release also contained the Sonic Underground episode "Sonic Tonic" as a bonus feature. The DVD was re-released by NCircle Entertainment in 2007, excluding the Sonic episode. A DVD featuring one episode plus two Heathcliff episodes was released as a prize in Golden Grahams cereal in 2004.

Due to the success of the DVD sets of The Super Mario Bros. Super Show!, Shout! Factory and Vivendi Visual Entertainment released a three-disc box set of The Adventures of Super Mario Bros. 3 with all twenty-six original episodes on June 26, 2007, which was released again in a double pack with Adventures of Sonic the Hedgehog volume 1 as a double pack on December 4 the same year, as a tie-in with Mario & Sonic at the Olympic Games. NCircle Entertainment (under license from Cookie Jar Entertainment) has also released the series in 4 volumes as well as the Collector's Edition of the complete series.

The show was re-released to Steam by Cinedigm in July 2015.

The show was also available on Tubi in late 2018 until it was removed.

The show was made available to stream on Paramount+ in 2021.

The original broadcast version of Adventures of Super Mario Bros. 3 features covers of licensed songs on five episodes and two Milli Vanilli songs on one episode. Due to copyright restrictions (or in Milli Vanilli's case, due to their 1989 lip-syncing scandal), the complete series DVD sets from both Shout! Factory and NCircle Entertainment use the song "Mega Move" from Captain N: The Game Master in place of the licensed songs, but the King Koopa Katastrophe DVD from Sterling Entertainment/NCircle Entertainment features three of the six episodes with the original broadcast music still intact.

Title	Ep #	Distributor	Release date
Super Mario Bros. 3: Mind your Mummy, Mommy Mario	2	Buena Vista Home Video	1994
Super Mario Bros. 3: Misadventures in Babysitting	2	Buena Vista Home Video	1994
Super Mario Bros. 3: Never Koop A Koopa	2	Buena Vista Home Video	1994
Super Mario Bros. 3: The Ugly Mermaid	2	Buena Vista Home Video	1994
Super Mario Bros.: King Koopa Katastrophe	6	Sterling Entertainment/NCircle Entertainment	July 22, 2003/August 21, 2007
Super Mario Bros. / Heathcliff	1	Sterling Entertainment	2004
The Adventures of Super Mario Bros. 3: The Complete Series	26	Shout! Factory	June 26, 2007
The Adventures of Super Mario Bros. 3: The Trouble with Koopas	6	NCircle Entertainment	January 6, 2009
The Adventures of Super Mario Bros. 3: What a Wonderful Warp	6	NCircle Entertainment	March 3, 2009
The Adventures of Super Mario Bros. 3: Koopas Rock	6	NCircle Entertainment	June 2, 2010
The Adventures of Super Mario Bros. 3: Complete Series Collector's Edition	26	NCircle Entertainment	May 14, 2013
The Adventures of Super Mario Bros. 3: The Complete Series (re-release)	26	NCircle Entertainment	November 14, 2023

=== Internationally ===
The show has also been released on DVD in Australia in a full box set made by MRA Entertainment.

In Europe, Disky Communications released three volumes with six episodes each in the UK, Germany and the Netherlands. A fourth volume, containing six more episodes, has only been released in Germany.

Pidax released the complete series in Germany (with English audio included) in one boxset.
