= Walker Boone =

Canadian actor (1944–2021)

- Born: Theodore Nicoloff; May 4, 1944; Toronto, Ontario, Canada
- Died: January 29, 2021 (aged 76)
- Occupation: Actor
- Years active: 1980–2012
- Children: 2

Walker Boone (born Theodore "Ted" Nicoloff; May 4, 1944 – January 29, 2021) was a Canadian actor. He was best known as the voice of the Nintendo character Mario in the DIC-produced animated series The Adventures of Super Mario Bros. 3 and Super Mario World.

== Early life and career ==
Boone was born on May 4, 1944, as Theodore Nicoloff in Toronto, Ontario. He attended the McGill University Faculty of Law before changing to a teaching career in Ontario and London. He briefly attended the Osgoode Hall Law School. In the 1980s, he left teaching to be an actor.

=== Personal life ===
He owned a farm. In addition, he also had a partner, Vicki, one grandchild, and two children, Larissa and Jason Nicoloff, the latter of whom played for the Ted Reeve Hockey Association. Boone had attempted to convince the Association to change its rules stating players, when traveling to an out-of-town tournament or series, must stay with billets, not their parents, but was unsuccessful.

== Death ==
Boone died on January 29, 2021, at the age of 76, but his death was not announced until August 11 that year.

== Filmography ==
=== Film ===
Year	Title	Role	Notes
1980	Deadline	Newscaster	
1981	The Last Chase	Policeman #1	
1981	Gas	Gangster 1 (Dutch)	
1982	Hard Feelings	Stanley	
1982	Visiting Hours	Elevator Policeman	
1983	Spasms	Sergeant Brody	
1984	He's Fried, She's Fried	Moussaka Husband	
1985	The Execution of Raymond Graham	Unknown	
1986	Youngblood	Assistant Coach	
1987	Blue Monkey	Johnson	
1987	Nightstick	Roger Bantam	
1990	Murder Times Seven	Loving Couple	
1991	F/X2	Mansion Guard #1	
1991	The Return of Eliot Ness	Bouncer	
1992	Snake Eater III: His Law	Lieutenant Durkee	Direct-to-video
1996	Balance of Power	Charlie	
1996	Darkman III: Die Darkman Die	Sergeant Troy	Direct-to-video
2009	Totally Spies! The Movie	Peppy Wolfman (voice)	English dub
2011	Leafie, A Hen into the Wild	Farmer (voice)	English dub

=== Television ===
Year	Title	Role	Notes
1981–1983	The Littlest Hobo	Unknown	3 episodes
1984	He's Fired, She's Hired	Moussaka Husband	Television film
1985–1987	Night Heat	Jerry Laws / Al Edwards / Alfred Windsor	7 episodes
1985–1987	Seeing Things	Vinnie	2 episodes
1985	The Execution of Raymond Graham	Unknown	Television film
1986	Kay O'Brien	Lee Villaneuva	1 episode
1986	The High Price of Passion	Bartender	Television film
1987	Check It Out!	Mr. Campbell	1 episode
1987	Nightstick	Roger Bantam	Television film
1988	Star Trek: The Next Generation	Commander Leland T. Lynch	Episode: "Skin of Evil"
1988	War of the Worlds	Prison Guard	1 episode
1989	The Hitchhiker	Nigel	1 episode
1990	Murder Times Seven	Loving Couple	Television film
1990	The Adventures of Super Mario Bros. 3	Mario (voice)	25 episodes
1990–1991	E.N.G.	Officer #1 / Grady	2 episodes
1991	My Secret Identity	Detective	1 episode
1991	Tropical Heat	Unknown	1 episode
1991	The Return of Elliot Ness	Bouncer	Television film
1991	Super Mario World	Mario (voice)	13 episodes
1992	Counterstrike	Buddy Lightstone	Episode: "The Three Tramps"
1993	Counterstrike	Bill Kaskins	Episode: "Muerte"
1993	Matrix	Richard Frielich	1 episode
1994	Due South	Crew Chief	1 episode
1996	Psi Factor	Barney	1 episode
1998	Earth: Final Conflict	Willie Collier	1 episode
1998	Highlander: The Raven	Detective Chapman	1 episode
2000	The Wonderful World of Disney	CIA Agent	1 episode
2000	On Hostile Ground	Poly-U-Boss	Television film
2001	Jackie, Ethel, Joan: The Women of Camelot	Steve Clark	Television film
2001	Doc	Bob Jankowski	1 episode
2002	Guilt by Association	Larry	Television film
2003	Blue Murder	Manuel Ramos	1 episode
2003	Mafia Doctor	Paul Mori	Television film
2005	Sue Thomas: F.B.Eye	Sergeant O'Leary	1 episode
2005	Kevin Hill	Captain Donald Burroughs	1 episode
2006	ReGenesis	Agent Miller	1 episode
2009	Flashpoint	Detective Keach	1 episode
2012	Warehouse 13	Dr. Selden	1 episode
