= Nightstick (film) =

1987 Canadian-American television film

- Written by: James J. Docherty
- Directed by: Joseph L. Scanlan
- Starring: Bruce Fairbairn; Kerrie Keane; Walker Boone; Leslie Nielsen; Robert Vaughn; John Vernon
- Music by: Robert O. Ragland
- Countries of origin: Canada; United States
- Original language: English

Production
- Producer: Martin Walters
- Cinematography: Robert Fresco
- Editors: Daniel Radford; Richard Wells
- Running time: 95 minutes
- Production companies: Calfilm Productions Ltd.; Screenvest I

Original release
- Release: September 1987

Nightstick, also released as Calhoun, is a 1987 Canadian-American made-for-television action film which had theatrical release and later released to video and to theaters outside the United States. Directed by Joseph L. Scanlan, the film stars Bruce Fairbairn, Kerrie Keane, Walker Boone, Leslie Nielsen, Robert Vaughn, and John Vernon.

Under the working title of Cahoun, production began December 1986 shooting on locations in Toronto and New York.

== Plot ==
Jack Calhoun is a "renegade cop" assigned by his boss Thad Evans to ward off a group of terrorists.

== Cast ==
- Bruce Fairbairn as Jack Calhoun
- Kerrie Keane as Robin Malone
- Walker Boone as Roger Bantam
- Tony De Santis as Jerry Bantam
- David Mucci as Pat Bantam
- Robert Vaughn as Ray Melton
- Leslie Nielsen as Thad Evans
- Eric Murphy as Thomas Grant
- Philip Akin as Price
- John Vernon as Adam Beardsly
- Mark McManus as Banker #2
- Chris Benson as Sam
- Ron White as Sid Stanton
- Glen Chin as Hop Sing
- Tony Rosato as Tony
- Jackie Richardson as Woman Singing
- Roger Dunn as Sergeant Finn
- François Klanfer as Dr. Case
- Diana Reis as Gloris Grant
- Sam Moses as Omar
- George Hevenor as Banker #1
- Patricia Moffatt as Banker #3
- Nicholas Pasco as Charlie
- Orest Ulan as FBI Agent Wilkins
- Dave Arkell as FBI Agent Spradley
- Howard Jerome as Mel Silverman
- Michael A. Miranda as Ismael
- Errol Slue as Floyd Edwards
- Aloa El Sayed as Young Arab
- Corinne Conley as Lynette Beardsly
- Reg Dreger as Alley Cop
- John Gardiner as Police Commissioner
- Phillip Jarrett]as Airport Cop #1
- Ralph Small as Airport Cop #2
- Catherine Gallant as Nurse Maria
- Alan Fawcett as Dr. Fred
- Angelo Rizacos as Jimmy Reilly
