= King Koopa's Kool Kartoons =

American local children's television show

- Genre: Variety; Comedy; Sketch comedy
- Created by: Gerry Pass
- Based on: The Super Mario Bros. Super Show! by Andy Heyward Mario by Nintendo
- Written by: Christopher Brough; Jack Hanrahan; Eleanor Burian-Mohr
- Directed by: Stephen J. Abramson
- Starring: Christopher Collins; Patrick Pinney
- Theme music composer: Haim Saban
- Country of origin: United States
- Original language: English
- No. of seasons: 1
- No. of episodes: 65

Production
- Executive producer: Andy Heyward
- Producer: Christopher Brough
- Production companies: DIC Enterprises; Nintendo of America

Original release
- Network: KTTV
- Release: September 11 – November 20, 1989

Related
- The Super Mario Bros. Super Show! (1989); The Adventures of Super Mario Bros. 3 (1990); Super Mario World (1991)

King Koopa's Kool Kartoons is an American children's television show broadcast in Southern California during the Autumn of 1989. The show was produced by DIC Entertainment in association with Fox Television Studios for the Fox television station KTTV by Gerry Pass – who developed and rolled out the Fox Kids Club – and Nintendo. It was a live-action spin-off to The Super Mario Bros. Super Show!, a popular animated show based on the Super Mario video games. The show was discontinued after 65 episodes.

The show stars King Koopa, based on an animated version of Bowser, the central arch-villain from the Mario video game series, which debuted in The Super Mario Bros. Super Show!. The 30-minute wrap around program was originally broadcast during late afternoon time slots, normally around 4:30pm to 5:30pm on the Los Angeles-based television channel KTTV Fox 11.

== Format ==
The format of the show was one of the last in the tradition of children's television shows in the vein of Bozo the Clown: the show would begin with the same pre-recorded theme song and lead into a live studio audience of around 40 to 60 children bussed in from around Los Angeles at the beginning of the show. The audience of children were all given special hats shaped like Koopa heads and T-shirts with "Koopa's Troopas" printed on them (the children would actually get to keep the shirts, but the troopa helmets, as they called them, were claimed by the producers at the end of the taping and reused every show). Koopa would then start talking to the audience with a different theme every day.

The live-action Koopa would then act as emcee, introducing old, public domain animated cartoon shorts, wrapped around different live-action segments, including a segment with Ratso, King Koopa's pet rat, a segment with Koopa reading fanmail, a segment with Mr. Mean Jeans, and a joke segment. King Koopa would then end the show by telling the audience to be a good Koopa Troopa or he would "Koopa Youpa'. After that, he would give contestants prizes with an envelope given by Ratso.

== Production ==
The show featured an actor in a King Koopa costume similar to one previously used in the 1989 Super Mario Bros.-themed Ice Capades show, only with a more detailed mask to make the actor look more believable on television. The actor playing Koopa (originally Christopher Collins, later Patrick Pinney) performed the role with a gruff, gravel-voiced faux-malevolence that ultimately revealed a hesitantly nice personality.

Unlike any previous appearance, King Koopa was seen with a pet creature named Ratso that best resembled a mix of dog and weasel with the large ears of a bat. Ratso had his own special "theatre" where kids could also claim prizes (in which he was played by a puppet). Koopa would be seen walking Ratso on a leash in the pre-recorded opening and closing credit sequences (where he was played by a dog in a costume).

Halfway through the series' production, Christopher Collins was fired and replaced, allegedly due to inappropriate behavior toward the crew and audience members. There are several rumors surrounding his dismissal, some claiming that he allegedly told a viewer, "You can say what you want... but now I know where you live", while others claim he was verbally abusive to children on set. The entire 65 episodes of King Koopa's Kool Kartoons was produced and developed over the course of 13 weeks before being quietly cancelled.

=== Cancellation ===
Despite high ratings and viewership, King Koopa's Kool Kartoons was not renewed for a second season. The full reasoning behind the show's cancellation is unknown, but is partially attributed by former writer Christopher Brough to be a formal invitation from the then-president of The Walt Disney Company, Michael Eisner, to Fox Kids to cancel the cartoon regarding the content. The show was later aired in the United Kingdom via The Children's Channel throughout the remainder of 1990.

== Reception ==
Reception of the show among children was overwhelmingly positive, but the show was not received well by parents, as an angry letter from the Los Angeles Times newspaper shows. In a "Viewers' View" column in the Los Angeles Times, a parent wrote that the show's portrayal of King Koopa was "frightening for small children". Gene Kendall of Comic Book Resources compared the show to the character Krusty the Clown from The Simpsons, saying that Krusty poked fun at the hosts from old children's talk shows, while King Koopa's Kool Kartoons took its own subversive approach to the genre.

In 1990, the program was nominated as the best youth program for the Los Angeles local Emmy Awards.

== Legacy ==
Due to King Koopa's Kool Kartoon's one-time broadcast format, the show is presumed lost, and efforts to preserve the show have been ongoing. In 2005, a user on the website Retro Junk uploaded the series' intro as a memento. Years later, several excerpts were uploaded, but no full episodes have been found.
