= Tony Rosato =

Canadian actor and comedian (1954-2017)

- Born: Antonio Rosato; 26 December 1954; Naples, Campania, Italy
- Died: 10 January 2017 (aged 62); Toronto, Ontario, Canada
- Occupations: Actor; comedian
- Years active: 1975–2017
- Spouse: Leah Murray (m. 2003; div. 2010)
- Children: 1

Antonio Rosato (26 December 1954 – 10 January 2017) was a Canadian actor and comedian, who appeared in television and films. He was best known as a cast member on both SCTV and Saturday Night Live, and for voicing Luigi in The Adventures of Super Mario Bros. 3 and Super Mario World.

== Early life ==
Antonio Rosato was born in Naples, Campania on 26 December 1954, and came to Canada at age four. He was raised in Halifax, Ottawa, and Toronto. He graduated from Oakwood Collegiate Institute. He planned to study chiropractic medicine, but dropped out of the University of Toronto after he began doing improv comedy at The Second City.

== Career ==
Rosato first gained attention when he and Robin Duke joined the cast of the first incarnation of SCTV in its third season during the fall of 1980. (Rosato had been seen as an extra and in bit roles in a handful of episodes in seasons 1 and 2.) His most well-known character on the program was the TV chef Marcello Sebastiano (a parody of Chef Pasquale). Rosato then moved with Duke to the cast of Saturday Night Live for the 1981–82 season. Following Jean Doumanian's tenure during the sixth season and Dick Ebersol trying to retool the show (and relying on Eddie Murphy and Joe Piscopo to spice up the sketches), Rosato only appeared on the show for one year before leaving due to differences with Ebersol and an expired contract.

Rosato is one of three SCTV cast members (along with Duke and, later, Martin Short) to join Saturday Night Live and the first SNL cast member to not be born in either the United States or Canada. Celebrities impersonated by Rosato on SCTV include: Lou Costello (whom he also impersonated when he was a cast member on Saturday Night Live), William Conrad, Danny Thomas, Woodstock co-organizer Chip Monck, SNL cast member John Belushi, Tony Orlando, Don Ho, and Ella Fitzgerald. His characters on SNL, despite his short tenure, were memorable as well, and included Ed Asner (in character as Lou Grant), Captain Kangaroo, and U.S. Attorney General Ed Meese.

In 1983, he starred as Aldo, the busboy in the short-lived Bea Arthur series Amanda's. The show was based on Fawlty Towers but was not well-received by audiences and was cancelled after 10 episodes.

Rosato next appeared on the Canadian police drama Night Heat, playing Arthur "Whitey" Morelli, from 1985 through 1989. He continued to appear in television and film throughout the 1990s.

=== Voice work ===
In the autumn of 1990, Rosato portrayed Nintendo's character Luigi on DiC's television show The Adventures of Super Mario Bros. 3 (based on Super Mario Bros. 3). He continued his role as Luigi in 1991 for the Super Mario World cartoon. Rosato had a small voice part in Resident Evil 3: Nemesis as Dario Rosso and the titular creature. In Bakugan: Gundalian Invaders, he voiced Dharak.

Rosato also provided voices for many other animated series including Pelswick, George and Martha, The Busy World of Richard Scarry, The Adventures of Sam & Max: Freelance Police, Mythic Warriors: Guardians of the Legend, Monster by Mistake, The Ripping Friends, Bakugan: Mechtanium Surge, Da Boom Crew, Get Ed and Odd Job Jack.

== Personal life ==
Rosato married Leah Murray on 31 December 2003; together, they had a daughter. After seven years together, Rosato and Murray's marriage ended in divorce in 2010.

=== Legal and mental health issues ===
On 5 May 2005, Rosato was arrested and charged with criminal harassment of his wife Leah, who asserted that his deteriorating mental health had caused her to fear for her safety and that of the couple's infant daughter. The charge was laid after Rosato complained repeatedly to Toronto and Kingston police that his wife, who had recently left him, and daughter had been abducted and replaced by impostors, a belief characteristic of Capgras delusion, a delusional misidentification syndrome with which the Crown's expert psychiatrist had diagnosed Rosato, according to Rosato's lawyer, Daniel Brodsky. It was alleged that the harassment occurred from 28 December 2003 and escalated until 21 April 2005. In spite of the diagnosis, Rosato, who denied mental illness and refused to plead insanity, was held for over two years without bail at a maximum-security detention centre. Brodsky, who called his client's two-year detention awaiting trial "shocking," asserted that Rosato "spent more time in custody on a harassment charge" than anyone ever convicted of the offence in Canada, estimating that "on average, someone convicted of criminal harassment spends one day in jail and two years on probation." The trial finally commenced on 7 August 2007, in Kingston and it ended on 5 September. Prosecutors downgraded the charge to a summary offence from an indictable offence, handing Rosato a conditional discharge, including a psychiatric hospital residence order, of which he ended up serving 19 months of a maximum of three years. Rosato was released from the hospital in March 2009 but remained on probation until September 2010.

== Death ==
Rosato died of a heart attack on 10 January 2017, at the age of 62.

=== Tributes ===
Saturday Night Live paid tribute to Rosato at the end of its 14 January 2017 episode. Also, a re-animated version of the Super Mario World episode "Mama Luigi", commissioned and directed by animation artist Andrew Dickman within a year with over 227 animators and artists participating, was dedicated to Rosato and his fellow voice actor and coworker Harvey Atkin, the voice of King Koopa, who had also died later in July that year. The video was released on 29 August 2017.

== Filmography ==
=== Film ===
Year	Title	Role	Notes
1978	The Silent Partner	Person Standing Outside Bank Door Being Unlocked	
1979	Running	Italian Athlete	
1980	Nothing Personal	Pickup Truck Driver	
1980	Hog Wild	"Bull"	
1981	Improper Channels	Dr. Arpenthaler	
1983	Utilities	Wendell	
1985	Shellgame	Chuck	Television film
1986	Separate Vacations	Harry Blender	
1986	Popeye Doyle	Wise-Ass Reporter	Television film
1986	Courage	"Jellybean" Pastori	Television film
1986	Busted Up	Irving Drayton	
1986	Perry Mason: The Case of the Shooting Star	Joe Devito (uncredited)	Television film
1986	One Police Plaza	Sol	Television film
1987	Hands of a Stranger	Anthony Ligouri	Television film
1987	Nightstick	Tony	Television film
1987	Sadie and Son	Morris	Television film
1987	Hearts of Fire	Woody	
1987	City of Shadows	Rosie	
1988	Switching Channels	"Joker"	
1989	Good Night, Michaelangelo	Older Michaelabgelo Buonanotto (voice)	
1989	Friends, Lovers & Lunatics	Mat's Boss	
1990	In Defense of a Married Man	Frank Ticelli	Television film
1991	Mystery Date	Sharpie	
1992	The Diamond Fleece	Cliff Vahrenhorst	Television film
1992	The Good Fight	Philip Brown	Television film
1995	Rent-a-Kid	Cliff Haber	Television film
1995	The Conspiracy of Fear	Raintree	Video
1995	Sugartime	Frank Ferraro	Television film
1995	Kissinger and Nixon	Charles Colson	Television film
1996	The Haunting of Lisa	Dr. Perry Azzaro	Television film
1997	Family Plan	Cliff Haber	
1998	Seeds of Doubt	Nick Brand	
1998	In the Doghouse	Tom Cheehak	Television film
1999	Coming Unglued	Marty	Television film
2002	You Belong to Me	Ernie	Television film
2003	Mafia Doctor	Detective Ralph Disanti	Television film
2005	Wayside: The Movie	Additional voices	Television film
2013	Real Gangsters	Mario	
2013	It Was You Charlie	Gus	
2013	We Are Not Here	Grover	Short
2014	The Christmas Switch	Salesman	
2014	The Big Fat Stone	Morrie Goldstein	
2015	No Deposit	Detective Tony Charkoff	
2015	La Trattoria Sitcom	Chief Tony	Television film
2015	Sicilian Vampire	Maitre D' At Don Giovanni's	
2016	Idiot Parade	Wil Epstein	Television film
2016	The Red Maple Leaf	Vincent Marcella	
2017	Born Dead	Tony	

=== Television ===
Year	Title	Role	Notes
1977–1981	SCTV	Various Characters	Season 3 (36 episodes)
1980	The Littlest Hobo	Cab Driver	2 episodes
1980	King of Kensington	Joe Cartino	1 episode
1981–1982	Saturday Night Live	Various characters	20 episodes
1983	Amanda's	Aldo	13 episodes (3 unaired)
1985–1989	Night Heat	Arthur "Whitey" Morelli	54 episodes
1986	Seeing Things	Terry	1 episode
1986	Hot Shots	King	1 episode
1986–1987	Hangin' In	Frank, Berry	2 episodes
1987	CBS Schoolbreak Special	Mr. Lopez	1 episode
1987–1989	Diamonds	Lieutenant Lou Gianetti	3 episodes
1990	Maniac Mansion	Tony	1 episode
1990	The Adventures of Super Mario Bros. 3	Luigi (voice)	26 episodes
1990	Wiseguy	Carlos Verduga	1 episode
1991	Sweating Bullets	Malto	Episode: "The Mariah Connection"
1991	Street Legal	Phil Jacobs	3 episodes
1991	Super Mario World	Luigi (voice)	12 episodes
1992	L.A. Law	Richard Cruz	1 episode
1993	Secret Service	Blake	1 episode
1994	RoboCop: The Series	Kevin Frosh	Episode: "Trouble in Delta City"
1994	Lonesome Dove: The Series	Prisoner	TV Miniseries
1994–1996	The Busy World of Richard Scarry	Additional Voices (voice)	36 episodes
1995	Highlander	Benny Carbassa	1 episode
1995	The Great Defender	Murray	1 Episode
1996	Due South	Clifford	1 episode
1996	F/X: The Series	Sammy Valenzuela	1 Episode
1996–1998	Stickin' Around	Additional voices	32 episodes
1997–1998	The Adventures of Sam & Max: Freelance Police	Additional voices	13 episodes
1998	Eerie, Indiana: The Other Dimension	Armand Tempus	1 episode
1998–1999	Mythic Warriors	Orpheus, Male Peasant (voice)	4 episodes
1999–2000	George and Martha	Duke (voice)	26 episodes
1999–2000	Relic Hunter	Stewie Harper	Season 1 (3 Episodes)
1999–2000	Blaster's Universe	Additional Voices (voice)	10 episodes
1999–2003	Monster by Mistake	Tom, Dad (voice)	3 episodes
2000	Hollywood Off-Ramp	Ben Harvey	1 episode
2000	Mentors	Casanova	1 episode
2000	The Accuser	Robert Heath, Member 1 (voices)	
2000–2002	Pelswick	Quentin Eggert (voice)	26 episodes
2001, 2004	Doc	Don / Jake	2 episodes
2002	The Ripping Friends	Goat Waiter / Minister of War	Episode: "The Infernal Wedding"
2003	Lucky	Tony	Episode: "Up the Steaks"
2003–2005	King	Additional voices	42 episodes
2004–2005	Da Boom Crew	Namdra (voice)	13 episodes
2004–2008	Atomic Betty	Additional voices	79 episodes
2005	Odd Job Jack	Sheriff Ironsides (voice)	Episode: "Odd Job John"
2005	Carl²	Additional Voice (voice)	1 episode
2005	6teen	Zane (voice)	Episode: "Unhappy Anniversary"
2005–2006	Get Ed	Crouch (voice)	
2007–2008	Wayside	Additional voices	24 episodes
2011	Detentionaire	Additional voices	1 episode
2011–2013	Scaredy Squirrel	Additional voices	
2014–2016	Odd Squad	Sabatino Confalone	2 episodes

=== Video games ===
Year	Title	Role	Notes
1999	M.U.G.E.N	Unknown Role	
1999	Resident Evil 3: Nemesis	Dario Rosso / Nemesis	
