= Super Mario World (TV series) =

1991 animated television series

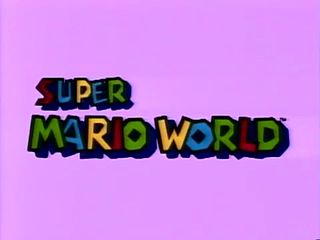
- Genre: Action; Adventure; Comedy; Fantasy; Musical
- Based on: Super Mario World by Nintendo
- Directed by: John Grusd
- Voices of: Harvey Atkin; Walker Boone; Tara Charendoff; Catherine Gallant; Paulina Gillis; Dan Hennessey; Judy Marshak; Gordon Masten; Tracey Moore; James Rankin; Tony Rosato; Andrew Sabiston; Michael Stark; John Stocker; Stuart Stone
- Theme music composer: Mark Mothersbaugh
- Opening theme: "Super Mario World"
- Ending theme: "Super Mario World" (instrumental)
- Composer: Michael Tavera
- Countries of origin: United States; Canada; Italy
- No. of episodes: 13 (list of episodes)

Production
- Executive producer: Andy Heyward
- Producer: John Grusd
- Running time: 11–12 minutes
- Production companies: DIC Animation City; Reteitalia S.p.A.; Nintendo of America

Original release
- Network: NBC (United States); Italia 1 (Italy)
- Release: September 14 – December 7, 1991

Related
- The Super Mario Bros. Super Show! (1989); King Koopa's Kool Kartoons (1989); Captain N: The Game Master (1989); The Adventures of Super Mario Bros. 3 (1990)

Super Mario World is an animated television series based on the video game of the same name by Nintendo. It is the third and final series based on the Mario video game series. Thirteen episodes of the show were aired as part of a block with Captain N: The Game Master, called Captain N and the New Super Mario World, on NBC (although the commercial eyecatch segments referred to the show as Captain N and Super Mario Bros. World). The animation was provided by Pacific Rim Productions.

== Synopsis ==
The animated series featured the same voice actors who had performed in The Adventures of Super Mario Bros. 3. Unlike its two predecessors, Toad is completely absent in this series (as he was in the Super Mario World game). An exclusive character not featured in the games called Oogtar, a clumsy caveboy, appears in his place (both characters voiced by John Stocker) and Yoshi appears as one of the main characters in the show. Episodes mainly focused on Mario and Luigi dealing with schemes by King Koopa, and made use of new elements introduced by the video game within the story, though involvement of the "real world" was reduced to mere references for this series.

Unlike previous Mario cartoons, the songs featured in Super Mario World were original tracks written exclusively for the series and are kept intact for syndication and home media releases.

=== Social issues ===
Certain episodes of the series were created to meet the newly implemented guidelines set forth by the Children's Television Act. Several exploits in this show instead became a serious matter at the time, including street gangs, obesity, capitalism, peer pressure, school bullying, and television addiction. Regarding this as a promotional failure, NBC ended the practice of Saturday morning cartoons in 1992 as these results were disputed by Federal Communications Commission.

== Voice cast ==
- Walker Boone as Mario
- Tony Rosato as Luigi
- Tracey Moore as Princess Toadstool
- Andrew Sabiston as Yoshi
- Harvey Atkin as King Koopa
- Dan Hennessey as Bully Koopa
- James Rankin as Cheatsy Koopa
- Michael Stark as Kooky von Koopa
- Gordon Masten as Big Mouth Koopa
- Paulina Gillis as Kootie Pie Koopa
- Tara Charendoff as Hip and Hop Koopa
- Catherine Gallant as Mama Fireplant
- John Stocker as Gophers, Koopa wizard, Wizardheimer, Oogtar
- Judy Marshak as minor characters

== Syndication ==
In 1992, after finishing its run on NBC, Super Mario World was included as part of the Captain N and the Video Game Masters syndication package by Rysher Entertainment.

== Home media ==
In 1994, Buena Vista Home Video released a VHS tape under their DIC Toon-Time Video label, titled Super Mario Bros. Super Christmas Adventures!, which contained the episode The Night Before Cave Christmas, which was the only episode released on VHS. No other episodes would be formatted on home media until 2007 due to legal complications with the use of the character Yoshi.

After resolving these issues, Shout! Factory and Vivendi Entertainment released a Complete Series DVD set of Captain N and the New Super Mario World in Region 1, featuring all 13 original, uncut broadcast episodes in November 2007. The series has also been released in Australia (Region 4) by MRA Entertainment.

NCircle Entertainment (under license from WildBrain) has also released the series in two volumes. They later released the complete series in one set, omitting the Captain N episodes likely due to likeness rights issues with the use of Bo Jackson in one episode, save for digital streaming.

Pidax released the complete series along Captain N: The Game Master Season 3 in Germany (with English audio included) in one boxset.

Release name	Ep #	Distributor	Release date	Additional information
Super Mario Bros. Super Christmas Adventures!	2	Buena Vista Home Video (DIC Toon-Time Video)	1994	
Captain N and the New Super Mario World - The Complete Series	13	Shout! Factory	13 November 2007	Select Episode Previews; Storyboard-to-Screen: Opening Title Sequence; Original Concept Art: Yoshi
Super Mario World - Yoshi the Superstar	6	NCircle Entertainment	29 September 2009	
Super Mario World - Koopa's Stone Age Quests	6	NCircle Entertainment	29 September 2009	
Super Mario World: The Complete Series: Collector's Edition	13	NCircle Entertainment	8 October 2013	Storyboard-to-Screen: Opening Title Sequence; Original Concept Art: Yoshi

As of November 2023, it is available to stream on Amazon Prime Video, Tubi, Pluto TV and Paramount+.

== Legacy ==
In 2006, after British satellite children's channel Pop began airing reruns of the series, the series gained a surge in popularity as being one of the major source materials for YouTube Poops alongside the other DIC Mario cartoons, video game Hotel Mario, Adventures of Sonic the Hedgehog, and multiple games animated by Animation Magic. The show produced multiple internet memes, most notably "Mama Luigi", referencing Luigi's quote in the episode of the same name.

In 2017, 227 animators collaborated to reanimate "Mama Luigi" in their own styles. Each of the 255 total scenes featured a unique animation style. It was dedicated to the memories of Canadian actors Tony Rosato and Harvey Atkin, who voiced Luigi and King Koopa respectively.
