= Luigi (character) =

Video game character

- Mario character
- Promotional art by Shigehisa Nakaue (2017)
- First game: Mario Bros. (1983)
- Created by: Shigeru Miyamoto
- Designed by: Shigeru Miyamoto; Yōichi Kotabe
- Voiced by: English: Danny Wells (The Super Mario Bros. Super Show!); Tony Rosato (1990–1991) (Note: The Adventures of Super Mario Bros. 3 and Super Mario World); Bob Sorenson (Mario Is Missing!); Corey Burton (Super Mario Bros. Audio Poster Pack); Marc Graue (Hotel Mario); Charles Martinet (1992–2023); Julien Bardakoff (1996–2001) (Note: Mario Kart 64 Japanese edition, Excitebike: Bun Bun Battle Stadium in-game, Mario Party, Mario Party 2 and Mario Kart: Super Circuit); Charlie Day (Illumination films); Kevin Afghani (2023–present); Japanese: Yū Mizushima (Super Mario Bros.: The Great Mission to Rescue Princess Peach!, Super Mario World: Mario & Yoshi's Adventure Land); Yoku Shioya (Super Mario's Fire Brigade); Naoki Tatsuta (Amada Anime Series: Super Mario Bros.); Ichirōta Miyagawa (1996–1998) (Note: BS Super Mario USA, Excitebike: Bun Bun Mario Battle Stadium and BS Super Mario Collection, all via Satellaview broadcasting only); Kōji Tsujitani (Japanese DVD dub of Super Mario Bros film); Bin Shimada (Japanese Nippon TV dub of Super Mario Bros film); Tasuku Hatanaka (Illumination films)
- Portrayed by: Danny Wells (The Super Mario Bros. Super Show!); John Leguizamo (1993 film)

In-universe information
- Occupation: Plumber
- Family: Mario (brother)

Luigi (/luˈiːdʒi/ loo-EE-jee; Japanese: ルイージ, romanized: Ruīji) is a character created by Japanese video game designer Shigeru Miyamoto. Part of Nintendo's Mario franchise, he is a kind-hearted, cowardly Italian plumber, and the slightly younger twin brother and partner of Mario. Like his brother, Luigi's distinctive characteristics include his large nose and mustache, overalls, hat (green, in his case), and medium-pitched, exaggerated Italian accent.

Luigi first appeared in Mario Bros., a 1983 platform game, in which he was originally designed as a palette swap of Mario with a green color scheme; Luigi has since appeared in multiple games and other media throughout the Mario franchise, in which he developed a personality and style of his own. As his role in the Mario franchise progressed, Luigi evolved into a physically distinct character, and became the main protagonist of Mario Is Missing! and the Luigi's Mansion series. Charles Martinet voiced Luigi from 1992 to 2023, when he was succeeded by Kevin Afghani.

Luigi has appeared in over 200 video games. These include puzzle games such as Dr. Luigi, role-playing games such as Paper Mario and Mario & Luigi, and sports games such as Mario Kart and Mario Tennis. Luigi has also appeared in other Nintendo properties, such as the Super Smash Bros. series of crossover fighting games. From March 2013 to March 2014, Nintendo called the period the Year of Luigi to commemorate the thirtieth anniversary of the character's existence. Correspondingly, games released in 2013 emphasized Luigi. An unlockable Luigi-themed version of Mario Bros., titled Luigi Bros., was also included with Super Mario 3D World.

Luigi's likeness has been featured in merchandise based on the Mario series, as well as comic books and television shows such as The Super Mario Bros. Super Show, in which he was portrayed by Danny Wells. He was also portrayed by John Leguizamo in the live-action film Super Mario Bros. (1993) and voiced by Charlie Day in the animated films The Super Mario Bros. Movie (2023) and The Super Mario Galaxy Movie (2026).

== Concept and characteristics ==
Luigi is the taller, younger brother of Mario, and is usually seen dressed in a green shirt, dark blue overalls, and a green hat with a green "L" insignia; like Mario, he is a plumber. Luigi's creation began during the development of Donkey Kong, where Shigeru Miyamoto had created Jumpman (later known as Mario), hoping that he would be able to recast the character in a variety of roles in future games. Miyamoto was inspired by the 1982 video game Joust to create Mario Bros.. During development of the game, Miyamoto took further inspiration from Joust to create Luigi by swapping Mario's color palette. It is currently unconfirmed how Luigi received his name, although there are many theories. New Straits Times noted that Miyamoto observed the Japanese word ruiji means "similar", thus explaining the similarities of Luigi to Mario. Rus McLaughlin of IGN wrote that theories from a rhyme on the Japanese word for "analogous" and a pizza parlor near Minoru Arakawa's office called Mario & Luigi's were considered.

Super Mario Bros.: The Lost Levels marked the beginning of Luigi's development toward becoming a more distinguished character, with his higher and farther jump. Consequently, in 1988, an alternative release was developed to serve as Super Mario Bros. 2 for Western players (and later released in Japan as Super Mario USA); this version played a key role in shaping Luigi's current appearance. His appearance in Luigi's Mansion helped develop Luigi's cautious and timid personality that he is known for. However, according to the manual for Mario Party, he's smarter than his older brother Mario. Being the younger twin of Mario, Luigi is presumed to be in his early 20s at most and raises the possibility that he's a teenager. Nintendo did not initially give Luigi a surname. The first notable use of "Luigi Mario" was in the 1993 live-action film adaptation. In September 2015, at the Super Mario Bros. 30th Anniversary festival, Miyamoto stated that Mario's full name was Mario Mario, indirectly confirming Luigi's full name as Luigi Mario.

=== Actor portrayal ===
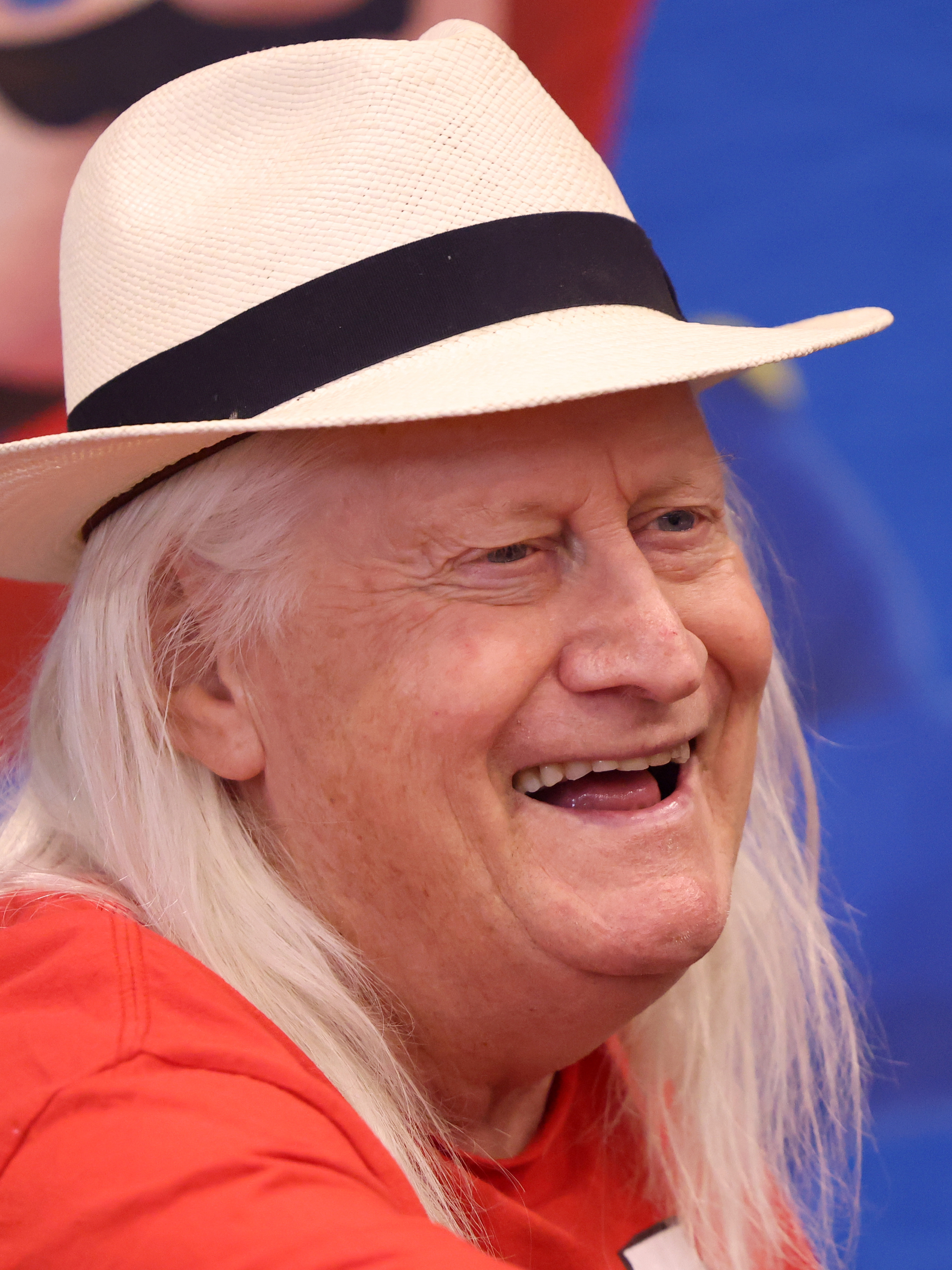
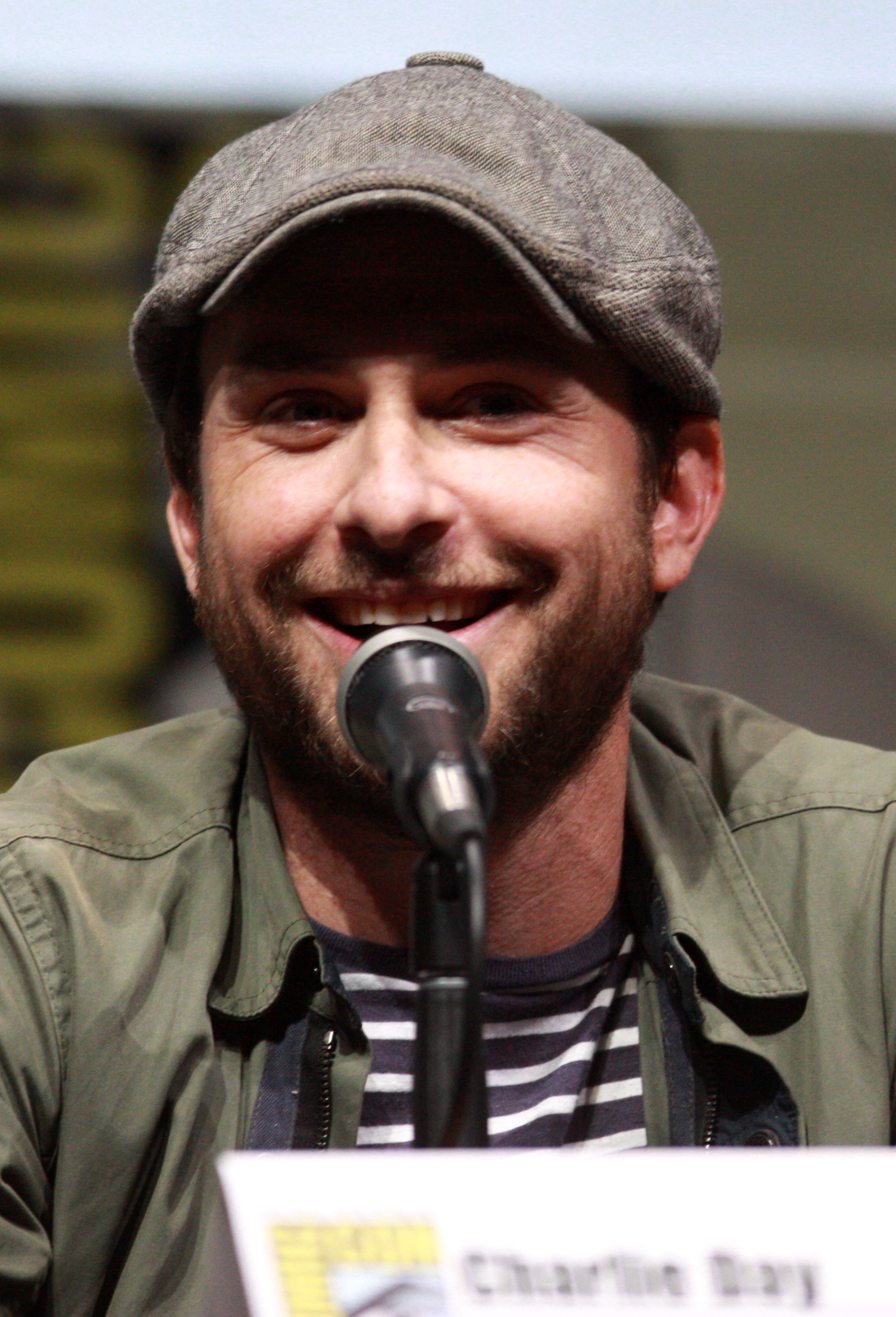
Charles Martinet (left) voiced Luigi for over 30 years before shifting to a brand ambassador position. Meanwhile, in film the character has been portrayed by John Leguizamo (center) and Charlie Day (right)

Much like his appearance, Luigi's vocal portrayal has fluctuated over the years. Mario Kart 64, in which many characters were voiced for the first time, some characters, including Luigi, had two different voices; the North American and European versions of the game feature a low-pitched voice for Luigi, provided by Charles Martinet, who also voiced Mario, Wario, and Waluigi. The Japanese version uses a high-pitched, falsetto voice, provided by the then French translator at Nintendo, Julien Bardakoff. Inconsistent voice acting continued with many Nintendo 64 games; all versions of Mario Party feature Bardakoff's high-pitched clips from Mario Kart 64.

Luigi retained this higher voice in Mario Party 2. In Mario Golf, Mario Tennis, and Mario Party 3, his voice returned to a lower state. Since then, with the exceptions of Mario Kart: Super Circuit and Super Smash Bros. Melee, Luigi has consistently had a medium-pitched voice, performed by Martinet until 2023 and Kevin Afghani since 2023. In Mario Kart: Super Circuit, Luigi's voice was the same high-pitched voice from the Japanese version of Mario Kart 64. In Super Smash Bros. and Super Smash Bros. Melee, Luigi's voice is made up of clips from Mario's voice taken from Super Mario 64, with raised pitches. In Super Smash Bros. Brawl, Super Smash Bros. for Nintendo 3DS and Wii U, and Super Smash Bros. Ultimate, he has his own voice (which is medium-pitched) instead of a pitched-up version of Mario's. Luigi was voiced by Charlie Day in the 2023 film adaptation and 2026 film adaption and was given a somewhat higher-pitched voice.

== Appearances ==
Luigi's first appearance was in the 1983 arcade game Mario Bros. as the character controlled by the second player. He retained this role in Wrecking Crew. He later appeared in Super Mario Bros. for the NES, and again in Super Mario Bros.: The Lost Levels, Super Mario Bros. 2, Super Mario Bros. 3, and Super Mario World. Super Mario Bros. 2 introduced Luigi as the taller of the two brothers, as well as the better jumper. Super Mario Bros. 3, and Super Mario World returned to featuring Luigi as identical to Mario. He made a minor appearance in his baby form in Super Mario World 2: Yoshi's Island. Luigi was conspicuously absent in Super Mario 64 and Super Mario Sunshine. However, the Nintendo DS remake of Super Mario 64 features him as a playable character alongside Mario, Yoshi, and Wario.

Luigi has been associated with the more difficult second acts of multiple Super Mario games. These include The Lost Levels, Super Mario Galaxy 2, New Super Luigi U and the new game plus in Super Mario 3D Land, which offer more challenging elaborations on their respective predecessors and allow the player to use Luigi as the main character, with whom reduced friction and higher jumping is consistent in all of these games. Luigi became playable in the Nintendo DS game New Super Mario Bros. as a hidden character, and as a hidden character in the Wii game Super Mario Galaxy. In its sequel, Super Mario Galaxy 2, the player can switch out for Luigi throughout the game. He also appears as a playable character in New Super Mario Bros. Wii, where four players can play at once cooperatively as Mario, Luigi, and two Toads. He also appears in Super Mario 3D Land as a playable character as well as New Super Mario Bros. 2 and New Super Mario Bros. U, the latter having a DLC mode, where he is the main character, called New Super Luigi U. It has levels altered to his specific play abilities, including higher jumping. The DLC is also available as a standalone retail version. Luigi also appeared in Super Mario 3D World along with his brother, Peach, Rosalina and Toad.

Luigi appears in many of the Mario spin-off games, including Mario Kart, Mario Party, and all of the Mario sports games. He also appears in all five installments of the Super Smash Bros. series; in the first three installments and Ultimate, he is an unlockable character. Luigi received his own starring role in the 2001 video game Luigi's Mansion, where he wins a mansion from a contest he never entered, and saves Mario from King Boo. He reprised his role in the installments Luigi's Mansion: Dark Moon and Luigi's Mansion 3.

Luigi has appeared in every Mario role-playing games. While he originally made a cameo appearance in the end credits of Super Mario RPG, he appears more prominently in the Paper Mario series. He is a non-playable character in the original Paper Mario. In the sequel Paper Mario: The Thousand-Year Door, he appears yet again as a non-player character, going on a separate adventure from Mario's. Super Paper Mario features him as a playable character after he is initially brainwashed into working for the antagonist under the name "Mr. L". In Paper Mario: Sticker Star and Color Splash, Luigi plays a minor role and can be found in the background of certain levels for a coin reward. In Color Splash, Luigi appears at the end of the game driving a kart and helps Mario reach Bowser's Castle. In Paper Mario: The Origami King, he once again helps Mario by retrieving the keys of Peach's Castle himself. The Mario & Luigi series features Luigi as a main protagonist.

=== Other media ===
Luigi made an appearance in the 1986 film Super Mario Bros.: The Great Mission to Rescue Princess Peach! in which he was voiced by Yū Mizushima. He was not given his consistent color scheme, sporting a yellow shirt with a blue hat, and overalls. In the film, Luigi is a greedy character and even leaves Mario at one point to look for coins. He was also a little more serious, but less courageous than his brother Mario, who constantly daydreamed about Princess Peach. Luigi later made an appearance in the OVA Amada Anime Series: Super Mario Bros. released in 1989, in which the Mario characters portrayed in the story of Snow White. He appears at the end of the video to save Mario and Peach from the Wicked Queen, portrayed by Koopa.

Luigi regularly appeared in The Super Mario Bros. Super Show!, airing from 1989 to 1990, which cast Danny Wells as both his live-action portrayal and voice. Like his brother, Luigi's voice actor changed in later cartoons, in his case to Tony Rosato. Even though he was not the starring character in the show, Luigi appeared in all 91 episodes of the three DiC Mario television animated series, in one of which his brother himself did not appear ("Life's Ruff" from The Adventures of Super Mario Bros. 3).

Luigi played a different role in the Super Mario Bros. film, where he was portrayed by John Leguizamo. He is depicted as a more easy-going character in contrast to the cynical Mario, portrayed by Bob Hoskins. In the film, Luigi is not Mario's twin, but is much younger to the point that Mario is said to have been like a surrogate father to him since their parents' deaths, and his romantic relationship with Daisy is one of the film's main plot elements. Luigi appears in The Super Mario Bros. Movie and The Super Mario Galaxy Movie voiced by Charlie Day. Luigi, alongside his brother Mario, are residents of Brooklyn who recently began their own plumbing business. Both stumble upon a Pipe, and while Mario is transported to the Mushroom Kingdom, Luigi is transported to the Dark Land where he is captured by Bowser and his forces. He later reunites with Mario near the film's climax to defeat Bowser.

== Reception ==
Allegra Frank of Polygon commented that the English manual for Mario Party described him as "smarter than Mario", but since Luigi's Mansion, Luigi has been defined by his wimpish persona, and due to being overshadowed by Mario, he "has an inferiority complex unparalleled in gaming". Den of Geek writer David Crow thought Luigi was "cooler" than Mario because he "jumps higher, runs faster", and particularly praised his appearance in the 1993 Super Mario Bros. movie as portrayed by John Leguizamo. Alex Siquig writing for The Ringer also felt that Luigi was unappreciated. He commented that Luigi has existed "within the confines of Mario's pixelated shadow since 1983" but felt that he had successfully carved out his own personality making a relatable character that is more than just a palette swap for Mario.

== Legacy ==
On March 19, 2013, Nintendo began the "Year of Luigi". This included a year of Luigi-themed games like Luigi's Mansion: Dark Moon, Dr. Luigi, Mario & Luigi: Dream Team, and New Super Luigi U. A Luigi's Mansion statue was released on Club Nintendo. On March 19, 2014, the Year of Luigi ended.

In 2015, game designer Josh Millard released Ennuigi which relates the story of Luigi's inability to come to terms with the lack of narrative in the original Super Mario Bros. In a Reddit thread, Millard commented that he enjoyed creating "a recharacterization of Luigi as a guy who's as legitimately confused and distressed by his strange life as you'd expect a person to be once removed from the bubble of cartoony context of the franchise."
