= Danny Wells =

Canadian actor (1941–2013)

- Wells in 2009
- Born: Jack Westelman; April 7, 1941; Montreal, Quebec, Canada
- Died: November 28, 2013 (aged 72); Toronto, Ontario, Canada
- Occupations: Actor, comedian
- Years active: 1972–2013

Jack Westelman (April 7, 1941 – November 28, 2013), professionally known as Danny Wells, was a Canadian actor and comedian. He was best known for his role as Charlie, the bartender on The Jeffersons, as well as his role as Luigi in the live-action/animated series The Super Mario Bros. Super Show!.

== Early life and career ==
Wells was born as Jack Westelman on April 7, 1941, in Montreal to Eli Westelman (September 13, 1913 – April 4, 1996) and Eunice Trottenberg (November 7, 1917 – September 20, 1987). He was Jewish. His acting career spanned more than four decades, beginning in 1972 on the comedy television show Love, American Style.

Wells playing his role as the first live-action Luigi from The Super Mario Bros. Super Show!

In 1975, Wells made his film debut in The Strongest Man in the World. He then went on to appear in a string of successful movies including Private Benjamin (1980) starring Goldie Hawn and Eileen Brennan, The Woman in Red (1984) starring Gene Wilder, Magnolia (1999), and The Last Kiss (2006) where he played the Uncle of Michael Weston's character Izzy.

Over his prolific career, Wells did most of his work in television, starring or making guest appearances in more than 80 television shows and movies, including Sanford and Son, CHiPs, The A-Team, and The Fall Guy. In 1975, he starred in the most notable role of his career: "Charlie the Bartender", on the hit television show The Jeffersons. Wells played Charlie as a recurring role throughout the entire 11 season run until the show was cancelled in 1985.

In the 1970s, he portrayed the store manager in television ads for Kmart department stores.

Wells began doing voice work in 1982 when he voiced the character of Stomper #1 in the Ralph Bakshi film Hey Good Looking. From there he went on to voice numerous characters for film, television and video games, including Descent 3 and Wizardry 8. His first television series was Heathcliff and The Catillac Cats (1984), which lead to the film Heathcliff: The Movie in 1986.

In 2002, Wells starred as film executive Jack L. Warner in the made-for-television movie "Gleason" starring Brad Garrett as Jackie Gleason.

As composer, Wells wrote the music for the 1979 CBS TV movie Never Say Never starring George Kennedy and Anne Schedeen.

=== The Super Mario Bros. Super Show! ===
Wells voiced several other animated series such as Batman: The Animated Series, Grossology and Johnny Bravo, but it was in 1989 that Wells starred in and voiced the animated character that he is perhaps best remembered by younger audiences as Luigi from The Super Mario Bros. Super Show!.

In an interview with "Slam" magazine, Wells recalled the popularity of the show: "We went on the air, three o'clock in the afternoon, with no publicity or P.R. at all. There was no pre-build-up to this show, nothing ... they just threw us out there. In three weeks, we became number one. We beat Disney, we beat everybody, without any publicity, without any help from anybody, this show went to the number one daytime cartoon show. They put us up against Mickey Mouse, it didn't matter, we beat them. It was amazing."

=== The Jeffersons ===
According to his cousin, television reviewer Alan Sepinwall, Wells worked steadily throughout the 1970s and 1980s. In 1975, Wells landed the role of "Charlie the Bartender" on the CBS television show The Jeffersons. His character, Charlie, owned "Charlie's Bar" on the first floor of the Colby East luxury apartment building where the Jeffersons and Willises resided. On the show, Wells' character would offer advice to the residents.

Charlie the Bartender quickly became a recurring role and towards the end of the series, he even had a few central episodes written specifically for him. In season 9, episode 5 ("Charlie's Angels"), Charlie borrows money from Tom Willis (played by Franklin Cover) in hopes of upgrading his bar and increasing business by way of risque dressed waitresses. Louise (played by Isabel Sanford) and Helen (played by Roxie Roker) take offense when they feel that the changes are exploiting the women. At the beginning of the final season, Charlie is facing eviction. George becomes partners with Charlie and buys the bar. In episode 17 of season 11, ("A Secret in the Back Room") it is discovered that Charlie has been sleeping in the back room due to a serious drinking problem that has separated him from his wife. George and Louise help him get his life back together. In another episode, Charlie's bar is just breaking even. Louise plans to put the bar back in the black with a private party for a biker gang ("The Gang’s All Here").

== Death ==
Wells died in Toronto on November 28, 2013, of cancer at the age of 72. He was buried in Mount Sinai Memorial Park Cemetery in Los Angeles, California. For fans of The Super Mario Bros. Super Show!, Wells' death was poignant since it was Nintendo's "Year of Luigi" and the 30th Anniversary celebration of the character (1983). His obituary states that "Danny followed his dreams ... he made them laugh." Wells' headstone inscription reads: "Keep 'em laughing."

== Filmography ==
=== Film ===
Year	Title	Role	Notes
1975	The Strongest Man in the World	Drummer	Film debut
1975	Whiffs	Civilian Doctor	
1976	Gus	Referee	
1976	The Shaggy D.A.	Police Official	
1978	Going Coconuts	Al	
1980	Private Benjamin	Slick Guy	
1981	Body and Soul	Announcer #1	
1982	Hey Good Lookin'	Stomper (voice)	
1984	The Woman in Red	Maitre D'	
1997	A Rat's Tale	Mr. Lou Dollart (voice)	
1999	Magnolia	Dick Jennings	
2001	Protection	Ryan	
2002	Swindle	Lieutenant Jackson Craig	
2006	The Last Kiss	Izzy's Uncle	
2007	Song of Solomon	Rabbi Aaron Rosenberg	Short
2011	Textuality	Mitch	
2012	Old Stock	Harold	Last film

=== Television ===
Year	Title	Role	Notes
1972–1973	Love, American Style	Fred, Bellhop	2 episodes (television debut)
1973–1974	Lotsa Luck	Ernie Kaplan	2 episodes
1974	Columbo	Bookstore Clerk, Gary Keppler	2 episodes
1974–1976	Sanford and Son	Danny Taylor, Haywood Jones	3 episodes
1975–1985	The Jeffersons	Charlie the Bartender	23 episodes
1976	Kojak	Riggs	Episode: "On the Edge"
1976	Flo's Place	Abner	Television movie
1976–1977	What's Happening!!	Bert Frederick/Undercover Cop	2 episodes
1977	The Hunted Lady	Wally	Television movie
1978–1979	Carter Country	Slippery Sam	2 episodes
1979–1981	Eight Is Enough	Easy Art, Ed Foster	2 episodes
1979–1981	CHiPs	Gordy, Phil Davies	3 episodes
1980	Nobody’s Perfect	Careful Eddie	2 episodes
1982	Lou Grant	Vince	Episode: "Jazz"
1982	Happy Days	Mr. Parker	Episode: "Chachi's Future"
1983–1984	The A-Team	Film Director, Artie Simmons	4 episodes
1984	Murder, She Wrote	Talk Show Host	Episode: "The Murder of Sherlock Holmes"
1984	Heathcliff & The Catillac Cats	Bush, Raul, General, Announcer (voices)	4 episodes
1984–1985	Silver Spoons	Waiter	2 episodes
1983–1986	The Fall Guy	Alex, Mel Bresins	2 episodes
1986–1989	Small Wonder	H.L., Eddie, Discount Dale	3 episodes
1987	The Real Ghostbusters	Cyrus Spengler (voice)	Episode: "Cry Uncle"
1989	The Super Mario Bros. Super Show!	Luigi, Aunt Luigeena, Luigeena, Luigi Bob	65 episodes
1985–1991	Hunter	Jake Flam, Murray Green	2 episodes
1990	Barnyard Commandos	Unknown role (voice)	Unknown episodes
1993	Renegade	Athletica 2000 M.C.	2 episodes
1993	Batman: The Animated Series	Guard (voice)	Episode: "Birds of a Feather"
1997	Johnny Bravo	The Bull (voice)	Episode: "Did You See a Bull Run by Here?"
1998	Oh Yeah! Cartoons	Big Guy, Derby Guy, Binocular Guy, Thom, Hungry #4, Hungry #5, Hungry #7 (voices)	2 episodes
1999–2000	Crashbox	"Poop or Scoop" Announcer (voice)	28 episodes
2002	Gleason	Jack L. Warner	Television movie
2004	Potatoes and Dragons	King Hugo III (voice)	78 episodes
2006–07	Grossology	The Detective (voice)	6 episodes
2009	Willa's Wild Life	Gus (voice)	Main Role
2009	Flashpoint	Charlie	1 episode
2011	Scaredy Squirrel	Lars Von Stacking (voice)	Guest Role, Episode: "Awaken the Stacker Within"
2012	The Cat in the Hat Knows a Lot About Christmas!	Unknown role (voice)	Television movie
2013	Rookie Blue	Walter	Episode: "For Better, for Worse" (final appearance)

=== Video games ===
Year	Title	Role	Notes
1999	Descent 3		
2001	Wizardry 8	Male Aggressive B	
2002	Evolution Worlds		
2005	Splinter Cell Chaos Theory	Captain Arthur Partridge	
