= List of non-video game media featuring Mario =

The Mario media franchise extends out of video games into non-game media. Mario and themes related to the franchise have appeared in television shows, anime, films, comics and manga, merchandise, and musical performance.

== Television ==
The Super Mario Bros. Super Show logo

Saturday Supercade is an animated television series produced for Saturday mornings by Ruby-Spears Productions. It ran for two seasons on CBS, beginning in 1983. Each episode comprised several shorter segments featuring video game characters from the Golden Age of Arcade Games. Donkey Kong, Mario and Pauline (from the Donkey Kong arcade game) were featured in the show.

The Super Mario Bros. Super Show! is the first American TV series based on the Mario NES games. It was broadcast in syndication from September 4 to December 1, 1989. Based on Super Mario Bros. and Super Mario Bros. 2. The show was produced by DIC Entertainment and was distributed for syndicated television by Viacom Enterprises (full rights have since reverted to DiC through Nintendo).

King Koopa's Kool Kartoons is a live action children's television show broadcast in Southern California during the holiday season of 1989/1990. The show starred King Koopa (also known as Bowser), the main antagonist of the Mario series. The 30-minute program was originally broadcast during the after-school afternoon time-slots on Los Angeles-based KTTV Fox 11.

The Adventures of Super Mario Bros. 3 is the second TV series based on the Mario NES games. It aired on NBC from September 8 to December 1, 1990. Based on the Super Mario Bros. 3 video game, the cartoon shows Mario, Luigi, Princess Toadstool and Toad fighting against Bowser and his Koopalings, who went by different names on the show. It was part of a 1-hour block with Captain N's second season, structured such that 2 episodes of Mario 3 would bookend the longer Captain N episode that made the "meat" of the sandwich.

The Super Mario Challenge is a game show which aired on The Children's Channel. It ran from 1990 to 1991 and aired at 4:30 p.m. every weekday. The presenter, John Lenahan, was a lookalike of Mario, and dressed in his clothes. Two guest players had to do tasks, all of which involved playing the Mario video games Super Mario Bros., Super Mario Bros. 2 and, after its release in 1991, Super Mario Bros. 3. Rounds included challenges to see which player could complete a level in the fastest time and who could collect the most gold coins on a certain level.

Super Mario World is an animated television series based on the SNES video game of the same name. It is the third and currently last Saturday morning cartoon based on the Mario series. The show was originally aired on Saturday mornings on NBC in the 1991–92 season. It was featured in a half-hour time slot with a shortened version of Captain N: The Game Master. Episodes of Super Mario World were later shown as part of the syndication package Captain N & The Video Game Masters. Afterwards, the series was split from Captain N altogether and shown in time-compressed reruns on Mario All-Stars.

Mario Ice Capades is a television special featuring a Mario-themed Ice Capades skating show, broadcast on ABC on December 28, 1989. It starred Christopher Hewett as Bowser. Jason Bateman and Alyssa Milano also appeared in the special.

== Films ==
Bowser and the Super Mushroom appeared in the 2012 Disney animated film Wreck-It Ralph; Mario is mentioned by Felix but not seen in the film. Mario's original arcade game appearance in Donkey Kong makes a cameo in the 2015 science fiction action comedy film Pixels.

=== Super Mario Bros.: The Great Mission to Rescue Princess Peach! (1986) ===
Super Mario Bros.: The Great Mission to Rescue Princess Peach! (Note: スーパーマリオブラザーズ ピーチ姫救出大作戦!, Sūpā Mario Burazāzu: Piichi-hime Kyūshutsu Dai Sakusen!) is a 1986 anime film based on the Super Mario Bros. video game. Directed by Masami Hata and produced by Masakatsu Suzuki and Tsunemasa Hatano, the plot centers on Mario and Luigi, who go on a quest to save Princess Peach from Bowser. It is notable for being the first film based on a video game, predating the live-action Super Mario Bros. film by seven years.

=== Super Mario Bros. (1993) ===
Super Mario Bros. is a 1993 American science-fiction comedy adventure fantasy film based on the Japanese video game series of the same name by Nintendo and distributed by The Walt Disney Studios through Hollywood Pictures, thus becoming one of several rare occasions where Disney and Nintendo have collaborated. The film was directed by Rocky Morton and Annabel Jankel, written by Parker Bennett, Terry Runté and Ed Solomon, and stars Bob Hoskins, John Leguizamo, Dennis Hopper, Samantha Mathis, Fisher Stevens, Fiona Shaw and Richard Edson. The story revolves around the titular Mario brothers, as they find a parallel universe, ruled by the ruthless dictator King Koopa, who seeks to merge the two dimensions so that he can rule both worlds, leaving it up to Mario and Luigi to join forces with Princess Daisy, the daughter of the world's displaced King, to stop Koopa.

Super Mario Bros. was shot in both New York City and North Carolina on a budget of $48 million. The film was released on May 28, 1993, in the United States and was unsuccessful both critically and commercially, receiving criticism for its storyline, characters, dialogue and unfaithfulness to the games. Bob Hoskins later stated in an interview in 2007 that the film was "the worst thing I ever did", despite being nominated for two Saturn Awards (one for Best Costume, the other for Best Make-up).

Years later, however, commentators called it a cult film, and it has spawned a fan-made website, a fan-made sequel comic, and even a Blu-ray release in the United Kingdom.

=== The Super Mario Bros. Movie (2023) ===
The Super Mario Bros. Movie is a 2023 animated film adaptation of the franchise, produced by Illumination and Nintendo and distributed by Universal Pictures. It is co-produced by Nintendo fellow and series' creator Shigeru Miyamoto and Illumination founder and CEO Chris Meledandri. The film stars the voices of Chris Pratt as Mario, Anya Taylor-Joy as Peach, Charlie Day as Luigi, Jack Black as Bowser, Keegan-Michael Key as Toad, Seth Rogen as Donkey Kong, Fred Armisen as Cranky Kong, Kevin Michael Richardson as Kamek and Sebastian Maniscalco as Foreman Spike; longtime Mario voice actor Charles Martinet features in a series of cameos. In January 2020, Nintendo's President Shuntaro Furukawa stated that the film is "moving along smoothly" with the film aiming for release in 2023. Furukawa stated that Nintendo would own the rights to the film, and both Nintendo and Universal would fund the production of the film. Meledandri called the film a "priority" for the Illumination animation studio.

The film features an origin story for the brothers Mario and Luigi, Italian-American plumbers who are transported to an alternate world and become entangled in a battle between the Mushroom Kingdom, led by Princess Peach, and the Koopas, led by Bowser.

After the critical and commercial failure of the live-action film Super Mario Bros. (1993), Nintendo became reluctant to license its intellectual properties for film adaptations. Mario creator Shigeru Miyamoto became interested in developing another film, and through Nintendo's work with Universal Destinations & Experiences to create Super Nintendo World, he met with Illumination founder and CEO Chris Meledandri. By 2016, the two were discussing a Mario film and, in January 2018, Nintendo announced that it would collaborate with Illumination and Universal to produce it. Production was underway by 2020, and the cast was announced in September 2021.

The Super Mario Bros. Movie was released in the United States on April 5, 2023. The film received mixed reviews from critics, though audience reception was more positive. The film has grossed over $1.360 billion worldwide, setting multiple box-office records, including the biggest worldwide opening weekend for an animated film and the highest-grossing film based on a video game. It also became the second highest-grossing film of 2023 and the sixth-highest-grossing animated film of all time.

=== The Super Mario Galaxy Movie (2026) ===
On March 10, 2024, as part of Mario Day celebrations, Miyamoto and Meledandri officially announced "a new Super Mario Bros. movie", along with a release date of April 3, 2026, in the United States and more dates throughout April for other territories. Horvath, Jelenic and Fogel will return as co-directors and screenwriter respectively; Meledandri stated that Illumination's team was in the process of storyboarding and "developing set designs for new environments." The film stars Pratt, Joy, Day, Black, Michael Key and Richardson reprising their roles joined by the voices of Benny Safdie as Bowser Jr., Brie Larson as Rosalina, Donald Glover as Yoshi, Issa Rae as the Honey Queen, Luis Guzmán as Wart, and Glen Powell as Fox McCloud.

The film features Mario and his friends going on a journey to find Princess Peach's long-lost sister Rosalina and save the Galaxy from Bowser and his son Bowser Jr..

In October 2024, Keegan-Michael Key teased that the sequel will be "broader in scope" and feature "new folks and old favorites and some folks that [he thinks] are really deep cuts". On May 13, 2025, the name of the sequel was revealed as Super Mario World in a press release released by NBCUniversal. Later in September 2025, the name was confirmed to be The Super Mario Galaxy Movie. The film was released in the United States on April 1, 2026.

=== Box office performance ===
Film	Year	Gross revenue			Tickets	Budget	Ref.
Film	Year	US & Canada	Other markets	Worldwide	Tickets	Budget	Ref.
Super Mario Bros.	1993	$20,915,465	$17,997,000	$38,912,465	6,618,419	$48,000,000	(Note: Super Mario Bros. (1993) admissions: United States, France, Germany – 5,740,898; United Kingdom – 877,521)
The Super Mario Bros. Movie	2023	$574,934,330	$785,848,884	$1,360,783,214	168,100,000	$100,000,000	
The Super Mario Galaxy Movie	2026	$429,814,610	$582,819,365	$1,012,633,975	134,900,000	$110,000,000	(Note: The Super Mario Galaxy Movie admissions: United States – 37,762,000; Japan – 4,947,393; Brazil, China, France, Germany, Italy, Russia, Spain – 21,564,771; Mexico – 14,810,000; United Kingdom – 4,700,000; South Korea – 1,606,328; Argentina – 1,159,454; United Arab Emirates – 353,188; Czech Republic – 195,858; Greece – 164,368; Hungary – 140,369; Finland – 136,106; Bulgaria – 90,982; Slovakia – 78,585)
Total		$1,025,664,405	$1,386,665,249	$2,412,329,654	309,618,419	$258,000,000	

=== Critical and public response ===
Film	Year	Critical response		Public response	
Film	Year	Rotten Tomatoes	Metacritic	CinemaScore	PostTrak
Super Mario Bros.	1993	29% (42 reviews)	35 (24 reviews)	B+	—
The Super Mario Bros. Movie	2023	59% (287 reviews)	46 (53 reviews)	A	94%
The Super Mario Galaxy Movie	2026	43% (209 reviews)	37 (45 reviews)	A-	79%

=== Awards and accolades ===
Accolades received by The Super Mario Bros. Movie
Award	Date of ceremony	Category	Recipient(s)	Result	Ref.
Golden Trailer Awards	June 29, 2023	Most Innovative Advertising for a Feature Film	"Giant Peach" (Inside Job)	Nominated	
MTV MIAW Awards	August 4, 2023	MIAWudio of the Year	"Peaches"	Nominated	
MTV MIAW Awards	August 4, 2023	Killer Series or Movie	The Super Mario Bros. Movie	Won	
Hollywood Music in Media Awards	November 15, 2023	Best Original Score – Animated Film	Brian Tyler	Nominated	
Hollywood Music in Media Awards	November 15, 2023	Best Original Song – Animated Film	Jack Black, John Spiker, Eric Osmond, Michael Jelenic, and Aaron Horvath ("Peaches")	Nominated	
The Game Awards	December 7, 2023	Best Adaptation	The Super Mario Bros. Movie	Nominated	
Washington D.C. Area Film Critics Association Awards	December 10, 2023	Best Voice Performance	Jack Black	Nominated	
Astra Film Awards	January 6, 2024	Best Voice-Over Performance	Jack Black	Nominated	
Astra Film Awards	January 6, 2024	Best Original Song	Jack Black, John Spiker, Eric Osmond, Michael Jelenic, and Aaron Horvath ("Peaches")	Nominated	
Golden Globe Awards	January 7, 2024	Best Original Song	Jack Black, John Spiker, Eric Osmond, Michael Jelenic, and Aaron Horvath ("Peaches")	Nominated	
Golden Globe Awards	January 7, 2024	Best Animated Feature Film	The Super Mario Bros. Movie	Nominated	
Golden Globe Awards	January 7, 2024	Cinematic and Box Office Achievement	The Super Mario Bros. Movie	Nominated	
Critics' Choice Movie Awards	January 14, 2024	Best Song	Jack Black, John Spiker, Eric Osmond, Michael Jelenic, and Aaron Horvath ("Peaches")	Nominated	
Saturn Awards	February 4, 2024	Best Animated Film	The Super Mario Bros. Movie	Nominated	
Movieguide Awards	February 9, 2024	Best Movie for Families	The Super Mario Bros. Movie	Won	
Annie Awards	February 17, 2024	Best Voice Acting – Feature	Jack Black	Nominated	
People's Choice Awards	February 18, 2024	The Movie of the Year	The Super Mario Bros. Movie	Nominated	
Visual Effects Society Awards	February 21, 2024	Outstanding Effects Simulations in an Animated Feature	Simon Pate, Christophe Vazquez, Milo Riccarand	Nominated	
Producers Guild of America Awards	February 25, 2024	Outstanding Producer of Animated Theatrical Motion Pictures	Chris Meledandri, Shigeru Miyamoto	Nominated	
Astra Film Creative Arts Awards	February 26, 2024	Best Publicity Campaign	The Super Mario Bros. Movie	Nominated	
Nickelodeon Kids' Choice Awards	July 13, 2024	Favorite Animated Movie	The Super Mario Bros. Movie	Nominated	
Nickelodeon Kids' Choice Awards	July 13, 2024	Favorite Male Voice From an Animated Movie	Chris Pratt	Nominated	
Nickelodeon Kids' Choice Awards	July 13, 2024	Favorite Male Voice From an Animated Movie	Jack Black	Nominated	
Nickelodeon Kids' Choice Awards	July 13, 2024	Favorite Female Voice From an Animated Movie	Anya Taylor-Joy	Nominated	
Nickelodeon Kids' Choice Awards	July 13, 2024	Favorite Villain	Jack Black	Won	

== Anime ==
- Amada Anime Series: Super Mario Bros.

アマダアニメシリーズ スーパーマリオブラザーズ (Amada Anime Shirīzu Sūpā Mario Burazāzu)
- Genre: Adventure, comedy
- Original video animation
- Produced by: Shinichiro Ueda
- Written by: Juri Yagi
- Studio: Studio Junio
- Released: August 3, 1989
- Runtime: 15 minutes each
- Episodes: 3

Amada Anime Series: Super Mario Bros. (Note: アマダアニメシリーズ スーパーマリオブラザーズ, Amada Anime Shirīzu: Sūpā Mario Burazāzu) is a series of three direct-to-video OVAs produced by Studio Junio, licensed by Nintendo, and released on VHS tapes on August 3, 1989, exclusively in Japan. The plot of the episodes involve characters from the Mario franchise in the stories of three fairy tales: Momotarō, Issun-bōshi and Snow White. Its cast includes Miyako Endō (Princess Peach, Kinopio, Morton Koopa Jr., Wendy O. Koopa), Tōru Furuya (Mario), Masaharu Satō (Koopa, Larry Koopa, Iggy Koopa), Naoki Tatsuta (Luigi, Ludwig von Koopa, Roy Koopa, Lemmy Koopa), and Toshiko Sawada (narration). The openings for each video used a soundtrack cue from On Golden Pond, namely "New Hampshire Hornpipe". "p:Machinery" by Propaganda and "Snapshot", "Comes and Goes" and "Donna" by Art of Noise were also used.

Super Mario's Fire Brigade (Note: スーパーマリオの消防隊, Super Mario no Shōbōtai) is a 1989 short fire safety public safety announcement video animated by Toei Animation and J.C.Staff, directed by Tatsuyuki Nagai and starring Toru Furuya as Mario, Yoku Shioya as Luigi, Saori Sugimoto as Kaoru, Yumi Tōma as Tatsuya, Chieko Saitō as Kaoru's Mom, and Daisuke Gori as Kaoru's Dad. There was also another video produced about traffic safety, titled Super Mario Traffic Safety (Note: スーパー マリオ の 交通 安全, Super Mario no Koutsuuanzen).

Super Mario World: Mario & Yoshi's Adventure Land (Note: スーパーマリオワールド マリオとヨッシーの冒険ランド, Sūpā Mario Wārudo Mario to Yosshī no Bōken Rando) is a 28-minute interactive video anime based on Super Mario World released for Bandai's Terebikko system in 1991. The Terebikko allowed viewers to interact with the anime using a telephone-shaped microphone to answer multiple choice questions, such as what will hatch from Yoshi's egg. The cast includes Tōru Furuya as Mario, Yū Mizushima as Luigi, Yuriko Yamamoto as Peach, Chika Sakamoto as Yoshi and Takeshi Watabe as Bowser.

Super Mario: ABC Song Video (Note: スーパーマリオ・ABCのうたビデオ, Super Mario: ABC no Utau Video) is a 15-minute educational video produced by Alpha Eihan and released by Shogakukan in 1992. The purpose of the video is to teach Japanese children English, including learning to master the pronunciation of the alphabet and counting from 1 to 10. In addition, it contains three English songs, "ABC Song", "Ten Little Indians", and "Good Morning" (each with a karaoke version). Mario's voice was provided by Gerri Sorrells, who was well known for her role in NHK's educational programs.

Mario Kirby Masterpiece Video (Note: マリオ・カービィ 名作ビデオ, Mario Kirby Meisaku Video) is an 18-minute educational video released by HAL Laboratory in 1995 on VHS exclusively in Japan. The purpose of the video is to teach kanji to children by featuring two adventures starring Mario and Kirby separately, with still pictures narrated over by Mayumi Tanaka and kanji transcriptions.

== Comics ==
=== Super Mario-kun ===
- Super Mario-kun

スーパーマリオくん (Sūpā Mario-kun)
- Genre: Adventure, comedy
- Manga
- Written by: Yukio Sawada
- Published by: Shogakukan
- English publisher: NA: Viz Media
- Magazine: CoroCoro Comic
- Original run: November 1990 – present
- Volumes: 61

Super Mario-kun (Note: スーパーマリオくん, Sūpā Mario-kun) is a Japanese kodomo manga series written and illustrated by Yukio Sawada (沢田 ユキオ Sawada Yukio) and serialized in the monthly manga anthology CoroCoro Comic. Individual chapters are collected into tankōbon volumes by Shogakukan, who released the first volume on July 27, 1991, and have released 60 volumes. The series has been licensed in Japan; France, published by Soleil Manga; and Spain, published by Planeta Comic. It follows Mario and his friends through the plot lines of many Mario video games, starting in Super Mario World and reaching as far as Super Mario Odyssey. Courses created by Sawada for Super Mario Maker were released in November 2015, with a Super Mario-kun costume unlocked for players who clear them.

Viz Media released the first English-language publication of CoroCoro's manga series in December 2020 under the title Super Mario Manga Mania.

A second manga series of the same title written and drawn by Hiroshi Takase (嵩瀬ひろし) ran for five volumes on Shogagukan's Pikkapika Comics. Because of the identical titles, Sawada's and Takase's series are easily confused.

A third manga series written and drawn by Kazuki Motoyama was published by Kodansha in Comic Bombom from 1988 to 1998. The series is altogether called KC Mario by the public in Japan, as volumes are named after new Mario games at the time in place of a consistent title. The series is substantially more well known by international audiences for its self-referential and subversively outrageous humor, with occasional use of innuendo not expected from a children's manga series; it also takes substantially more creative liberty than its contemporaries, introducing original characters and power-ups not seen in the games. Luke Plunkett of Kotaku described the work as "a wild ride".

=== Nintendo Comics System ===
The Nintendo Comics System was a series of comic books published by Valiant Comics in 1990 and 1991. It features characters from Nintendo's video games and the animated series based on them.

=== Super Mario Adventures ===
Super Mario Adventures is an anthology of comics that ran in Nintendo Power throughout 1992, featuring the characters from Nintendo's Mario series and based loosely on Super Mario World. The series was also serialized in CoroCoro Comic in 1993. Charlie Nozawa, the artist who created the comics, is also known by the pen name Tamakichi Sakura. Kentaro Takekuma was responsible for the story, which follows Mario and Luigi as they attempt to rescue Princess Peach (known as "Princess Toadstool" in the English comic) after she is abducted by Bowser with intent to marry her.

=== Gamebooks ===
Nintendo Gamebooks were gamebooks released in two series, Nintendo Adventure Books and You Decide on the Adventure, and based on video games created by Nintendo.

== Electromechanical games ==
Nintendo has licensed several electromechanical games for use in arcades and casinos, including two popular pinball machines by Gottlieb. Super Mario Bros., released on April 25, 1992, was the first Gottlieb machine that included a dot-matrix display tracking scores and various animations. The game shared a lot of its art assets with Super Mario World released for SNES two years prior, and featured Craig Brolley as the voice of Mario. 4,200 units were manufactured. Super Mario Bros. Mushroom World released a few months later in June 1992, this time based on Super Mario Bros. 3 for NES. Only 519 units were produced, making it significantly rarer and more sought after by modern collectors.

Other electromechanical games licensed by Nintendo include a Mario Kart 64 slot machine made by Maygay, as well as a series of Mario Fushigi medal games made by Capcom. The Mario Fushigi series began in 2003 with Super Mario Fushigi no Janjan Land, then Super Mario Fushigi no Korokoro Party in 2004, Super Mario Fushigi no Korokoro Party 2 in 2005, and Mario Party Fushigi no Korokoro Catcher.

== Merchandise ==
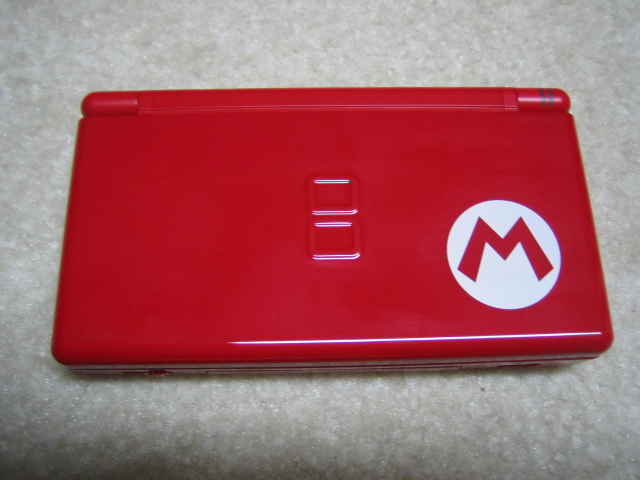
A Mario-themed Nintendo DS Lite

Mario has appeared on lunch boxes, T-shirts, magazines, commercials (notably, in a Got Milk? commercial), in candy form, on shampoo bottles, and as plush toys. Multiple Mario-themed versions of popular board and card games have been released by USAopoly, including Monopoly, TacDex, and Connect 4. Nintendo has also released in 2017 a puzzle featuring Mario.

== Events ==
National Mario Day is an annual celebration to commemorate Mario on March 10. This date is chosen because "MAR 10" looks like the name MARIO. Gamers can commemorate the occasion by playing games from the series, or with Mario-themed events, and coordinating on social media with the hashtag #NationalMarioDay.

In 2014 the Christian Science Monitor advised parents that Mario Day was an opportunity to bond with their children, and listed Mario Day-themed events parents could take their children to, to encourage that bonding. In 2016, Nintendo created a video about the event, where Mario caused chaos in their American offices; and "brought some joy to the monotonous workday in the ways only Mario could." Chad Concelmo of Destructoid appears in the video.

In March 2013, Nintendo began the Year of Luigi. This included a year of Luigi-themed games like Dr. Luigi, Mario & Luigi Dream Team and New Super Luigi U. A Luigi's Mansion statue was released on Club Nintendo. On March 19, 2014, the Year of Luigi ended.

In September 2020, Nintendo started the Super Mario Bros. 35th Anniversary event, which lasted from September 3, 2020, to March 31, 2021. This event began with a Nintendo Direct which announced many games, as well as covering already released Mario themed merchandise, clothing and in game events.

== Theme parks ==
Super Nintendo World is a themed area within Universal Studios Japan, Universal Studios Hollywood and Universal Epic Universe, and under construction for Universal Studios Singapore. The iterations of this area and its attractions are themed to the Super Mario franchise, as well as the Yoshi's Island spin-off series, and the Donkey Kong Country series.

== Music ==
The Super Mario series of video games has a large amount of music, much of it composed by Koji Kondo. The "Super Mario Bros. theme" is particularly well-known.

The Super Mario Bros. theme has been featured in many concerts, including "PLAY! Chicago", the Columbus Symphony Orchestra, Play! A Video Game Symphony, and others.

The Video Games Live concert featured the theme performed by Koji Kondo.

== See also ==
- List of unofficial Mario media
