= Miyako Endō =

Japanese voice actress

Miyako Endō (遠藤 みやこ, Endō Miyako; born March 21, 1965) is a Japanese voice actress. She works for Aoni Production. She graduated from Aoyama Gakuin University.

== Filmography ==
=== Anime ===
- Remy in Getter Robo Go
- Miyoko's mother (3rd Voice) and Yūki Uehara (2nd Voice) in Kiteretsu Daihyakka
- Female Student B (ep. 21) in Oniisama e...
- Hiromi Matsuno (ep 21); Nana Asahina/Oniwabandana (ep 43) in Pretty Soldier Sailor Moon
- Unazuki Furuhata in Pretty Soldier Sailor Moon R
- Unazuki Furuhata in Pretty Soldier Sailor Moon SuperS
- Princess Momomo in Tomatoman
- Jan in Transformers: Victory
- Princess Peach, Kinopio, Morton Koopa Jr., and Wendy O. Koopa in Amada Anime Series: Super Mario Bros.

=== Non-anime roles ===
- System voice in Dead or Alive video games except for Dead or Alive Xtreme, Dead or Alive X2 and Dead or Alive 5.
- System voice in Double Dragon for Neo Geo.
