= Bowser (surname) =

Bowser is a surname. It is of Norman origin and it either comes from Beausire which was given to a person who frequently used the informal Norman greeting beu sire, which means "good sir", or "fine sir", or from Bouser which originally means "dweller of place with bushes".

Notable people with the surname include:

- Arda Bowser (1899–1996), professional football player
- Charley Bowser (1898–1989), American football coach
- Doug Bowser, former president of Nintendo of America
- John Bowser (1856–1936), Australian politician and 26th Premier of Victoria
- George Bowser, Canadian comedian, of Bowser and Blue duo
- John W. Bowser (1892–1956), Canadian who supervised construction of the Empire State Building
- Jonathon Earl Bowser, Canadian artist and illustrator of Zabibah and the King
- Mary Bowser, American freed slave who worked as a Union spy during the American Civil War
- Muriel Bowser, current Democratic mayor of Washington, D.C.
- Ryan Bowser, music producer
- Sylvanus Bowser (1854–1938), American inventor
- Tyus Bowser (born 1995), American football player for the Baltimore Ravens
- William John Bowser (1867–1933), Canadian politician and 17th Premier of British Columbia
- Yvette Lee Bowser, American television writer and producer

== Fictional characters ==
- Bowser, antagonist from the popular video game franchise Super Mario.
- Bowser Simmons, from the TV show Teenage Bounty Hunters

== See also ==
- Beausire
