= Bowser =

Video game character

- Mario character
- Promotional art by Shigehisa Nakaue (2019)
- First game: Super Mario Bros. (1985)
- Created by: Shigeru Miyamoto
- Designed by: Shigeru Miyamoto; Yōichi Kotabe
- Voiced by: English: Harvey Atkin (1989–1991) (Note: The Super Mario Bros. Super Show!, The Adventures of Super Mario Bros. 3 and Super Mario World TV series); Rob Wallace (Mario Is Missing!); Marc Graue (Hotel Mario); Bruce Robertson (Mario's Time Machine Deluxe); Scott Burns (2002–2009, 2012–2013); Kenny James (2005–present); Eric Newsome (Super Paper Mario); Jack Black (Illumination films); Japanese: Akiko Wada (Super Mario Bros.: Peach-Hime Kyushutsu Dai Sakusen!); Masaharu Satō (Amada Anime Series: Super Mario Bros.); Takeshi Watabe (Super Mario World: Mario & Yoshi's Adventure Land); Takanobu Hozumi (Japanese DVD dub of Super Mario Bros. film); Hiroshi Arikawa (Japanese Nippon Television dub of Super Mario Bros. film); Naoki Tatsuta (BS Super Mario Collection; via Satellaview broadcast); Kenta Miyake (Illumination films)
- Portrayed by: Various: Christopher Collins/Patrick Pinney (King Koopa's Kool Kartoons) Christopher Hewett (Mario Ice Capades) Dennis Hopper (Super Mario Bros.)

In-universe information
- Species: Koopa
- Children: Bowser Jr. (son)

Bowser (Japanese: クッパ, Hepburn: Kuppa; "Koopa"), also occasionally referred to as Lord Bowser, King Bowser, King Koopa, Koopa, or King of the Koopas, is a character and the main antagonist of Nintendo's Mario franchise. In Japan, his title is established as Daimaō (大魔王; "Great Demon King"). He is the arch-nemesis of Mario, and the leader of the Koopa clan. Depicted as a fire-breathing monster with a tyrannical personality, Bowser's ultimate goals are to kidnap Princess Peach and conquer the Mushroom Kingdom.

Bowser debuted as Mario's opponent in the 1985 video game Super Mario Bros. Designer Shigeru Miyamoto initially conceived him as an ox based on the Ox-King as depicted in the Toei Animation film Alakazam the Great. However, Takashi Tezuka remarked that the character should look more like a turtle, leading artist Yōichi Kotabe to redesign Bowser as the leader of the turtle-like Koopas. Since 2005, Bowser has been primarily voiced by Kenny James.

Following Super Mario Bros., Bowser has appeared in various genres, including role-playing games like Paper Mario and Mario & Luigi, sports games such as Mario Kart and Mario Tennis, and fighting games like Super Smash Bros. He has appeared in multiple animations, including three series produced by DIC Entertainment (voiced by Harvey Atkin) and was portrayed by Dennis Hopper in the 1993 Super Mario Bros. film. Jack Black voiced him in The Super Mario Bros. Movie (2023) and The Super Mario Galaxy Movie (2026).

Bowser has received a mostly positive reception, with critics noting that he is one of the most iconic and recognizable video game villains. He was crowned the greatest video game villain of all time by the Guinness World Records Gamer's Edition.

== Development ==
The earliest known concept artwork for Bowser

Bowser was created by Nintendo designer and producer Shigeru Miyamoto for Super Mario Bros., the character's debut. Miyamoto had first envisioned Bowser as an ox, based on the depiction of the ox-like Gyū-Maō (called "King Gruesome" in the English version) in the Toei Animation film Alakazam the Great, an adaptation of the 16th-century Chinese novel Journey to the West. Miyamoto contemplated commissioning the game's art to a manga artist or illustrator. However, due to a lack of time, he created the game's original box art himself. Due to this, Miyamoto's original artwork for Super Mario Bros features a design that is different from later renditions, more closely resembling his idea of an ox, with a gray-blue complexion and lack of horns.

However, shortly after this, artist and animator Yōichi Kotabe (who had worked at Toei himself) joined Nintendo to refine and standardize the character designs. Nintendo designer Takashi Tezuka pointed out that the character was meant to be turtle instead of an ox. Through discussions with Miyamoto and Tezuka, Kotabe then began to redesign his look to reflect a leader of the turtle-like Koopa Troopas. Kotabe based Bowser's final design on the Chinese softshell turtle, which he recognized as highly aggressive, reflecting Bowser's short temper. With Kotabe's final design, Miyamoto commented that he could make Bowser "look cool now". Kotabe's design forms the basis for most of Bowser's subsequent appearances in both video game graphics and other artwork.

Bowser's original working name was "Boss Creeper" (ボス クリーパー Bosu Kurīpā), after the Shellcreepers, the predecessors to the Koopa race, from Mario Bros. Miyamoto then named him 大魔王 クッパ Daimaō Kuppa. Kuppa came from the Japanese name for 국밥, gukbap, a Korean dish. Miyamoto had also considered the names ユッケ Yukke and ビビンバ Bibinba, also Japanese names of Korean dishes (육회 yukhoe and 비빔밥 bibimbap respectively). For the later North American release of the game, which also introduced the anglicized spelling "Koopa", the character was named Bowser. His Korean name is not Gukbap, but 쿠파 Kupa, which is essentially a phonetic round-trip translation. The name was anglicized to Kuppa rather than Koopa in the Japanese versions up until the release of Super Mario World.

It is currently unconfirmed how the character received the English-language name "Bowser", or who gave him this name, although there are multiple competing theories. Matthew Byrd of Den of Geek noted that one theory comes from "Bowser" being a popular name for pets at the time, while another suggests that Miyamoto himself chose the name because both "Bowser" and Bibinba start with B. Another theory still relates to the origins of the surname "Bowser", derived from a Norman greeting meaning "good sir", and that it may be used ironically for the character given his diabolical nature.

Within early comics and potentially in the Super Smash Bros. series, Bowser has been compared to Gamera, the iconic fictional turtle kaiju with the abilities to breathe fire as well as fly by hiding in his shell and spinning it; Bowser's ability to perform the latter is called "Gamera Attack" (ガメラアタック, Gamera Attakku).

== Characteristics ==
Bowser is the King of the Koopas, turtle-like species that inhabit the world of the Mushroom Kingdom. Bowser differs greatly from the rest of the Koopa clan, which consists mainly of bipedal tortoises. He has a large, spiked turtle shell, horns, a draconic muzzle with fangs, taloned fingers, three clawed toes on each foot, red eyes, and a shock of red hair. He has immense physical strength, is nearly indestructible, can breathe fire, and can jump very high for his large size. He is accomplished in black magic for teleportation, summoning objects, flying, generating electricity, telekinesis, or metamorphosis.

Bowser's physical size varies and in most games, he towers over most characters. In Super Mario RPG, he stands only slightly taller than Mario. He changes his size at will or through others' sorcery in games including Yoshi's Island, Super Mario Galaxy, and Super Mario Galaxy 2.

Bowser aspires to take over the Mushroom Kingdom and merge it with his own realm. He is infatuated with Princess Peach, and routinely kidnaps her as part of his plans for domination. Sometimes, he kidnaps Peach simply to lure Mario into a trap, but occasionally he hopes to marry her, such as in Super Mario Odyssey. He is typically the central antagonist in the main series, but in the RPG series, he sometimes works with the heroes to defeat a greater evil. His personality is generally menacing and sinister, but he sometimes displays a more comical side as a blustering, buffoonish bully with some emotional vulnerability. He also cares for his minions.

Originally in Super Mario Bros. 3, Bowser was stated to be the father of the Koopalings with subsequent official sources adding that he is their biological father, but since their return in New Super Mario Bros. Wii they have been referred to as Bowser's minions. Bowser Jr. was introduced as Bowser's son in the 2002 game Super Mario Sunshine. In a 2012 interview, Shigeru Miyamoto stated, "Our current story is that the seven Koopalings are not Bowser's children. Bowser's only child is Bowser Jr., and we do not know who the mother is."

New Super Mario Bros. marked the debut of Dry Bowser, a skeletal form of Bowser resulting from his being disfigured by lava. Dry Bowser also appears as a separate character in various spinoff games.

== Appearances ==
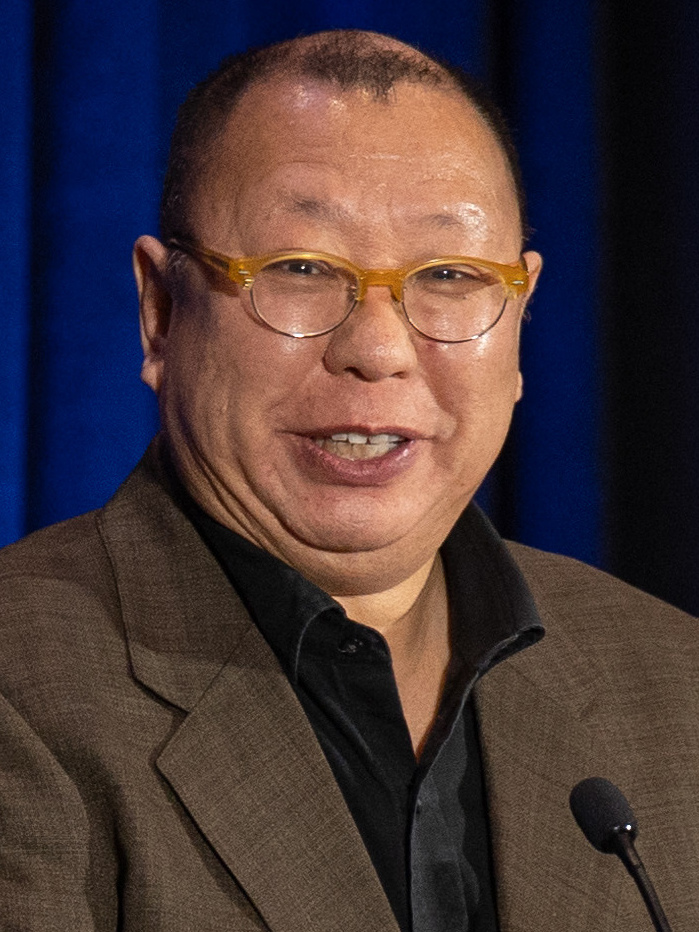
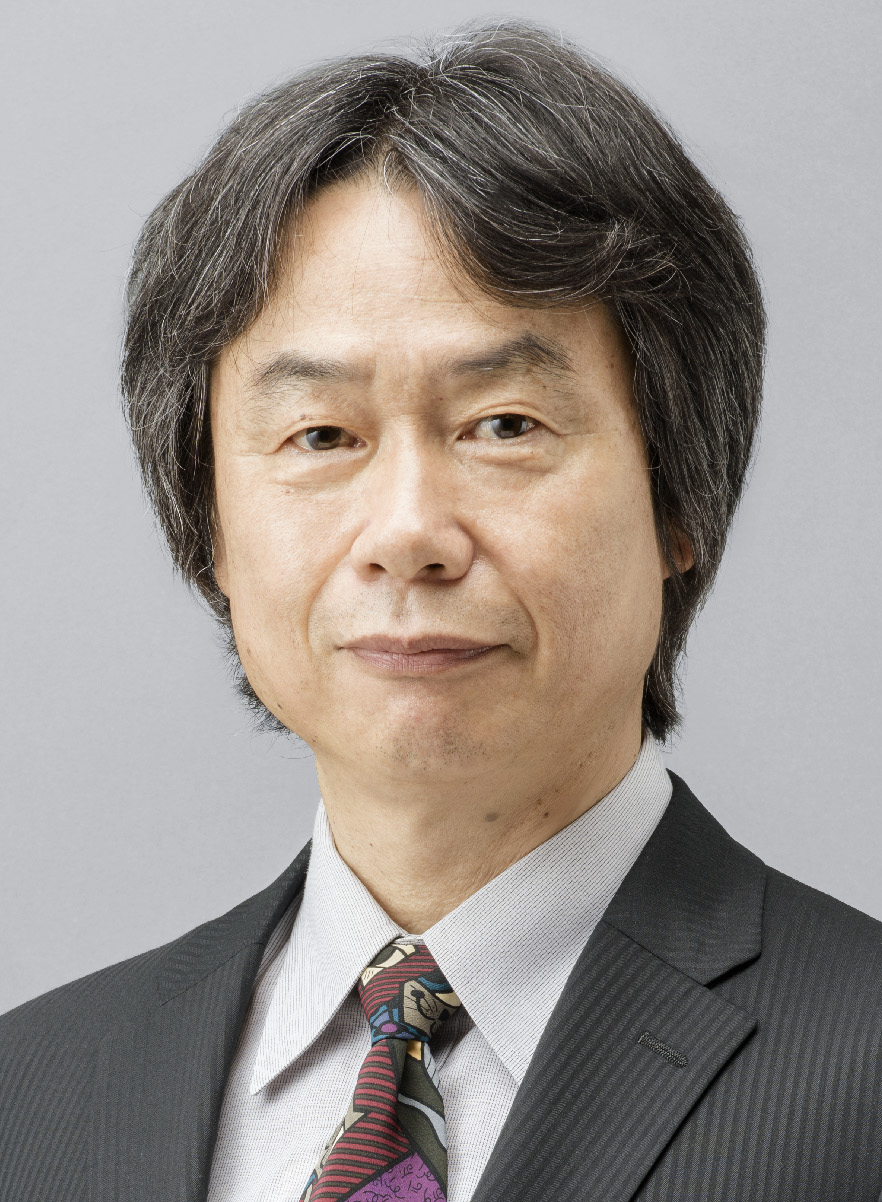
Shigeru Miyamoto (right) and Takashi Tezuka collaborated on Bowser's new image fitting for the commander of the turtle-like Koopa Troopas. Miyamoto said in his final design that he could make Bowser "look cool today".

Bowser debuted in the video game Super Mario Bros.. He then appeared through all Super Mario games (with the exception of games such as Super Mario Land), the Paper Mario series, the Yoshi series, and the Mario & Luigi series.

=== Other Mario games ===
Bowser has appeared in nearly all of the Mario spin-off games, including in the Mario Kart and Mario Party series. Bowser appeared in multiple Mario sports games, such as Mario Tennis, Mario Golf, Super Mario Strikers, and Mario & Sonic at the Olympic Games.

He appeared in Mario's Time Machine, Hotel Mario, and Mario Pinball Land. Bowser appears as a playable character in Itadaki Street DS and its Wii sequel Fortune Street. Bowser is also a Dark attribute character who appears as the main opponent in Puzzle & Dragons: Super Mario Bros. Edition.

Bowser appears in Super Mario RPG: Legend of the Seven Stars. In Mario + Rabbids Kingdom Battle, Bowser makes a cameo. He also reappears in the sequel Mario + Rabbids Sparks of Hope.

=== Other games ===
Bowser is a playable character in every installment of the Super Smash Bros. series since 2001's Super Smash Bros. Melee. He was intended to be playable in the series' first installment, but was removed during development due to time constraints. Bowser is in Tetris Attack, a game based on the Japan-exclusive Super Famicom release Panel de Pon. All of the original cast members are replaced except for the non-playable Mr. Time, with characters from Super Mario World 2: Yoshi's Island, with adult Bowser, the sole character in Attack not seen in Island, taking on the role of Corderia as final boss. With the name Hammer Slam Bowser, Bowser debuts as a playable character in Skylanders: SuperChargers. He appears alongside Donkey Kong and comes with a Skylanders unique figurine. Dr. Bowser is playable in Dr. Mario World.

=== In other media ===
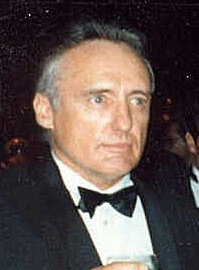
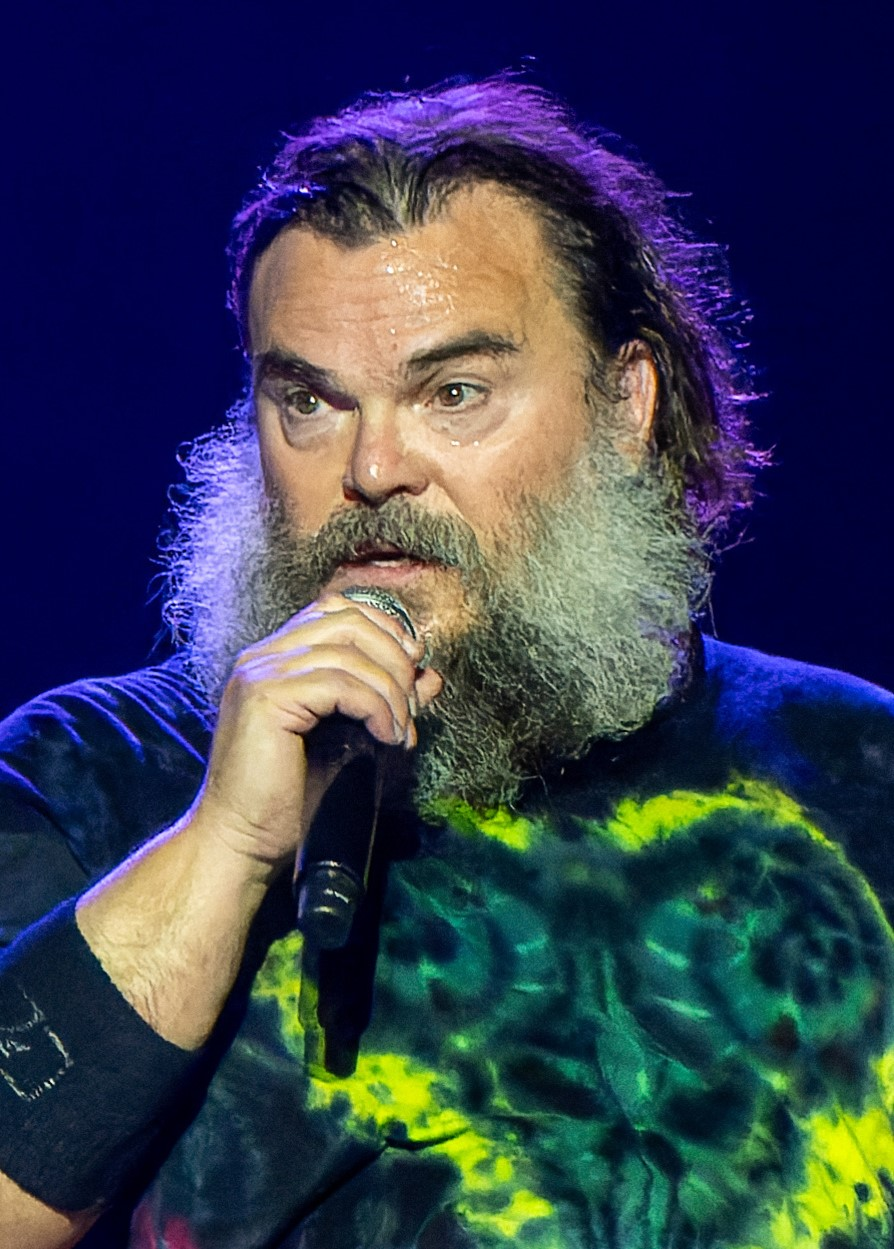
Dennis Hopper (left) portrayed Bowser (referred to as Koopa) in the 1993 live-action film Super Mario Bros.. Jack Black (right) voiced Bowser in the 2023 Super Mario Bros. animated film, and the 2026 sequel.

Bowser's first appeared outside of video games in the 1986 anime film Super Mario Bros.: The Great Mission to Rescue Princess Peach, based on the first Super Mario Bros., in which he was credited as "King Koopa" and voiced by Zainichi Korean singer and media personality Akiko Wada. In the film, he turns the citizens of the Mushroom Kingdom into inanimate objects and plans to forcibly marry Peach on Friday the 13th as revenge for her rejection of his proposal. Using three Power-Ups collected on their journey to his castle, Mario and Luigi defeat him and return the Mushroom Kingdom back to normal.

The DiC Entertainment animated television series The Super Mario Bros. Super Show!, The Adventures of Super Mario Bros. 3 and Super Mario World feature a different version of Bowser, known as King Koopa and voiced by Harvey Atkin. This version of the character was also portrayed in live-action by Christopher Collins, and later Patrick Pinney, in the related children's television series King Koopa's Kool Kartoons, and appeared in various print media such as the Super Mario Bros. issues of the Nintendo Comics System.

Dennis Hopper portrayed President "King" Koopa in the 1993 live-action film Super Mario Bros. In the film, Koopa is the usurper ruler of Dinohattan, a city in a parallel universe in which humans evolved from dinosaurs rather than mammals. He abducts Princess Daisy and schemes to merge his world with the human world using a fragment of the meteorite that separated the human and dinosaur dimensions in her possession. This incarnation is almost entirely human in appearance, with blonde hair he gels in a crown-like shape, and he frequently wears a black business suit and necktie made of reptilian hides. After brief exposure to his own evolution-reversing technology by the Mario Bros., he starts occasionally possessing some reptilian traits. The climax of the film sees Koopa devolved into an enormous green Tyrannosaurus rex by the Mario Bros., who further devolve him into primordial ooze.

Bowser is one of the gaming villains attending a "Bad-Anon" support group in the 2012 animated film Wreck-It Ralph. The writers had early on envisioned the Bad-anon meeting with Bowser as a major character within the scene; according to film director Rich Moore, Nintendo was very positive towards this use, stating in Moore's own words, "If there is a group that is dedicated to helping the bad guy characters in video games then Bowser must be in that group!"

Bowser was voiced by Jack Black in The Super Mario Bros. Movie (2023) and The Super Mario Galaxy Movie (2026). In the first film, Bowser plots to destroy the Mushroom Kingdom using a Super Star he has obtained unless Princess Peach agrees to marry him. His plans are ultimately foiled by Mario and Luigi, who use the Super Star to incapacitate him before Peach and Toad shrink and imprison him. The film has also made Bowser the subject of an Internet meme with the song "Peaches", written and performed in character by Black, in which Bowser professes his love for Peach. In the sequel, Mario and Luigi's attempts to rehabilitate Bowser are interrupted when Bowser Jr., searching for his father, abducts them and Yoshi inside Peach's castle. After they are dropped into the Honeyhive Galaxy, Bowser goads Mario into attacking him, thus unshrinking him, but kindly allows himself to be arrested for damaging the fields so the brothers and Yoshi can leave. Later, Jr., whom he had sent to boarding school years prior, abducts him again and convinces him to return to his old ways. During the final battle, Bowser is dropped into a lava moat but resurfaces as Dry Bowser and fights the brothers and Yoshi until they defeat him and Jr.; the Bowsers are ultimately imprisoned by Fox McCloud.

Bowser appeared in Nintendo gamebooks. He appears as the primary antagonist in Nintendo Power's comic series Super Mario Adventures.

== Reception and legacy ==
Due largely to the success of the Mario franchise, Bowser has become one of the most iconic and easily recognizable video game antagonists of all time. He frequently appears in lists for greatest video game antagonists. IGN placed him at No. 2 out of 100, and GamePro placed him at No. 9 out of 47. GameSpot listed him at No. 9 in their "Top 10 Video Game Villains" article, stating "Of all the villains to make an appearance on this list, Bowser... has got to be the most interesting," later adding "While some people say Bowser's life may have gotten into a rut, the man has simply refined his game down to an everyday thing. He's focused, he's dedicated, and worst of all, he's patient." Bowser ranked in the first slot on GameDaily's top 10 Nintendo characters that deserve their own games list, explaining if Yoshi and Wario get their own games, Bowser should too due to his being one of gaming's most nefarious villains. In GameDaily's top 10 Smash Bros. characters list, he ranked sixth. GameDaily also included him in their most persistent video game villains list. However, Bowser has been also rated as the 4th-biggest douchebag in gaming history by ScrewAttack, who said that he wants to "take Mario down". IGN editor Craig Harris described Bowser as being a household name. In 2011, Empire ranked him as the 23rd-greatest video game character while Guinness World Records Gamer's Edition 2013 featured Bowser first in their list of top 50 Villains. IGN named Bowser as one of the "oldest villains in gaming history, not to mention one of the most iconic."

Bowser's role in Super Mario Galaxy has been met with significant praise. Eurogamer editor Margaret Robertson commented that after years of being a "comedy villain", Galaxy put him back at his "scaly, scabrous best". PALGN editor Chris Sell called him the best boss in Mario Galaxy, stating that it wasn't just because of the battles with him being "superb, screen filling affairs", but also because he is "back to being mean again". Nintendo World Report editor Aaron Kaluszka commented that battling Bowser has never been "this intense and engaging". IGN editor Cam Shea praised his physical appearance in Super Mario Galaxy, describing him as "imposing and weighty". Another IGN editor, Matt Casamassina, praised the visual quality of the characters, citing Bowser in particular and mentioning how his "funky red fur waggles in the wind". Game Positive editor Travis Simmons concurred, commenting that his hair "gives him a touch of personality".

Bowser's role in Mario & Luigi: Bowser's Inside Story has highly positive reception, frequently referenced as its main character. Eurogamer editor Christian Donlan commented that it felt good to play as Bowser, and that "After years of picking a path carefully around threats, jumping out of harm's way, and tackling challengers mostly from above, it's a pleasure to put those cares aside and relish a few hours of spiky, tortoise-shelled power." Destructoid editor James Stephanie Sterling described Bowser's gameplay as "brilliant comic relief". She also described the dialogue of the game as being "laugh out loud funny", specifically praising Bowser's ego. RPGamer editor Michael Cunningham praised the game for Bowser "stealing the show", but also decried it for not having quite enough of him. Nintendo World Report editor Pedro Hernandez commented that the plot and humor of the game make iconic characters "more enduring, including Bowser".

NGamer magazine editor Matthew Castle commented that all Mario role-playing games make good use of Bowser, but that this is the first game where Bowser takes the center stage. Game Style editor Drew Middlemas commented that Bowser stole the show, being portrayed as a "creature of pure, blustering ego who reminds us of why he's one of gaming's greatest baddies." N-Europe editor called him the "real star" of the game, calling him a "fantastic character" with "so much more to give than what we've seen from him so far, even in the other Mario RPGs". He added that his "foul mood and lack of intelligence" as well as his interactions with other characters are well written. Kombo editor commented that he became a more sympathetic character as the game progresses, adding that his "massive ego pushes him towards heroism". Wired editor Chris Kohler called Bowser awesome, adding that his segments are funnier than Mario and Luigi's. Giant Bomb editor Brad Shoemaker states that Bowser steals the show, commenting that playing as him gives players an inside glimpse of his ego and megalomania. IGN editor Craig Harris described Bowser as the only "core Nintendo character over the past couple decades" to not have a starring role in a video game, and this game acts as his "big break". 1UP.com editor Jeremy Parish stated that Bowser makes the game, describing him as more interesting than Bowser's Inside Story predecessor's partners, the baby forms of Mario and Luigi. GamePro editor Alicia Ashby called Bowser one of the most "lovable characters in the Nintendo universe", and praising Bowser's Inside Story for giving him "much deserved time in the spotlight". GameSpy editor Phil Theobald called him the breakout star of the game, stating that "the gruff, quick-to-anger pro/antagonist is a treat to watch as he continuously becomes infuriated with the incompetence of his minions." GamesRadar editor Henry Gilbert stated that he is "home to the most drastic change to the formula" in this game, stating that while he is still a "humorously incapable villain", the game allows players to switch between Bowser and the Mario Bros. at their discretion."

Some Super Mario 64 fans joked that Mario supposedly shouts, "So long, gay Bowser!" when throwing him a great distance. In April 2019, Charles Martinet, Mario's voice actor, tweeted that Mario says, "So long, King-a Bowser!". In the Japanese Rumble Pak-compatible version, as well as Super Mario 64 DS and Super Mario 3D All-Stars, Mario instead says "buh-bye!", which Nintendo later confirmed in a tweet.

In the 2018 short comic The Super Crown's Some Spicy New Mario Lore on DeviantArt and Twitter, Bowser uses a Super Crown to transform into a monstrously sinister female resembling Peach, which fans named Bowsette. The character subsequently went viral. In 2015, the alligator snapping turtle of the Amur River was discovered and became an Internet sensation for its resemblance to Bowser. "Bowser Day 2021" became a Twitter fad.
