= New Super Mario Bros. Wii =

2009 video game

- Packaging artwork
- Developer: Nintendo EAD Software Development Group No. 4 (Note: Nvidia Lightspeed Studios developed the Nvidia Shield version.)
- Publisher: Nintendo
- Director: Shigeyuki Asuke
- Producers: Takashi Tezuka; Hiroyuki Kimura
- Designers: Yusuke Amano; Masanao Arimoto; Shigefumi Hino
- Programmer: Makoto Sasaki
- Artist: Michiho Hayashi
- Composers: Shiho Fujii; Ryō Nagamatsu; Kenta Nagata
- Series: Super Mario
- Platforms: Wii; Nvidia Shield TV
- Release: Wii: AU: November 12, 2009; NA: November 15, 2009; EU: November 20, 2009; JP: December 3, 2009; Nvidia Shield TV: CN: December 5, 2017
- Genre: Platform
- Modes: Single-player, multiplayer

New Super Mario Bros. Wii (Note: Japanese: New スーパーマリオブラザーズ Wii, Hepburn: Nyū Sūpā Mario Burazāzu Wī) is a 2009 platform game developed and published by Nintendo for the Wii. A follow-up to New Super Mario Bros., it was first released in Australia, North America, and Europe in November 2009, followed by Japan a month later. It was released on the Wii U's Virtual Console in 2016, though only in Europe, Australia and Japan. A port in high definition resolution for the Nvidia Shield TV was released only in China in December 2017. Like other side-scrolling Super Mario games, the player controls Mario as he travels eight worlds and fights Bowser's army to save Princess Peach. New Super Mario Bros. Wii was the first Super Mario game to feature simultaneous cooperative multiplayer gameplay; up to four people can play in cooperative and competitive multiplayer modes, taking control of Mario as well as Luigi and two Toads, Yellow Toad and Blue Toad. The game also introduced "Super Guide", which allows the player to watch a computer-controlled character complete a level.

Shigeru Miyamoto had desired to create a Super Mario game with cooperative multiplayer since the series' conception. After failed attempts to integrate cooperative multiplayer into Super Mario 64 due to hardware limitations, he was able to fully explore the concept with the advent of the Wii and its more advanced hardware capabilities. Following the critical and commercial success of New Super Mario Bros., Miyamoto looked to create a follow-up which would also serve as a staple game for its console and achieve similar levels of success. Additionally, after developing it and feeling in retrospect that it was not as challenging as he hoped, Miyamoto designed New Super Mario Bros. Wii with the intent of both higher level of challenge for players who desired one and accessibility for players of all skill levels. Features such as Super Guide and the ability to enter a floating bubble on command and opt out of doing a certain part of a level were added to cater to beginners, whereas other details, such as an award for not prompting the Super Guide block to appear in any level, were added to provide a layer of difficulty. Shiho Fujii and Ryo Nagamatsu composed the game's soundtrack, whereas Koji Kondo, the series' regular composer, served as sound adviser.

The game was announced following a slight drop in profits, with Nintendo hoping its release would help to rejuvenate sales of the Wii. New Super Mario Bros. Wii was both critically and commercially successful, receiving particular praise for the introduction of its multiplayer aspect, while its gameplay and level design were also praised, although some critics were disappointed by its lack of innovation compared to its predecessor and previous Super Mario titles. It received several honors, including the Best Wii Game award from the 2009 Spike Video Game Awards, IGN, and GameTrailers, and is the fourth-best-selling game for the Wii as of March 2021, having sold 30.32 million copies worldwide. In 2012, it was followed by New Super Mario Bros. 2 for the Nintendo 3DS and New Super Mario Bros. U for the Wii U.

== Gameplay ==
New Super Mario Bros. Wii is a 2.5D side-scrolling platformer; although it plays out in 2D, most of the in-game characters and objects are 3D polygonal renderings on 2D backgrounds. In single-player mode, the player controls Mario and must complete various levels, which are filled with enemies, obstacles, and helpful items. The player must maneuver Mario to a large flag pole at the end of each stage to progress. The game can be played with the Wii Remote held horizontally, or vertically with the Wii Nunchuk attached. Mario can run, jump, and perform additional moves returning from New Super Mario Bros. such as wall kicks, ground pounds, and double and triple jumps. New Super Mario Bros. Wii frequently makes use of the Wii Remote's motion control features; the player can shake the controller to perform various actions, such as a short spin jump which kills enemies, a mid-air twirl that can be used to prolong air time, and the ability to pick up, carry, and throw certain objects. Some areas within levels, such as specific platforms, can be manipulated by standing on them and tilting the Wii Remote. Certain levels are set underwater, where the player must swim to traverse the level.

The player can collect gold coins to earn extra lives. Levels contain power-ups encased in floating blocks that help the player: The Super Mushroom allows Mario to take one extra hit, and increases Mario's height. The Fire Flower lets Mario shoot fireballs at enemies. The Super Star gives the player temporary invincibility and increases his running speed. The Mini Mushroom, which reappears from New Super Mario Bros., causes Mario to shrink in size, letting him jump higher, run on water, and fit through small spaces, but does not allow the player to take an extra hit from enemies or other obstacles before losing a life. New power-ups include the Propeller Suit, which allows Mario to fly for a short time by shaking the Wii Remote; the Ice Flower, which gives Mario the ability to shoot balls of ice which freeze enemies into large ice blocks that can be lifted and thrown; and the Penguin Suit, which functions like the Ice Flower while also allowing the player to slide along the ground and across water, as well as giving them tighter control on ice and in water. Yoshi appears in certain levels and can eat, swallow, and spit enemies and objects, and flutter for a period of time.

The game consists of eight worlds containing eight to ten levels each, with a secret ninth world accessible by beating the eighth world. The levels in the ninth world can be unlocked by locating hidden Star Coins in previous worlds, which serve as the main collectibles in each level. Levels are accessed via a world map that is rendered in 3D; completing a stage unlocks the next one, with multiple paths sometimes available after completing a stage. Each world contains two boss levels—a midway fortress and a castle at the end of the world—where the player battles one of the seven Koopalings. Certain worlds also contain an Airship stage in which the player battles against Bowser Jr. In addition to levels, there are also "Toad Houses" located across the map in which the player can play a short minigame to earn extra lives or items that can be equipped from the map screen. Map screens often have enemies roaming them in certain dedicated areas which, when encountered, initiate a "mini-boss" fight that always awards the player three mushrooms. At certain points, a Toad will appear trapped in one of the previously completed levels, and the player can choose to rescue him from a block and carry him safely to the end of the stage to earn a reward. Every course contains three Star Coins which are hidden in hard-to-reach areas. These can be spent on hint movies that show off tips and tricks for the game, including the locations of secrets and methods for earning extra lives.

The player begins the game with five lives, but more can be obtained through a plethora of ways including collecting items and playing minigames. Losing a life will return the player to the map, and losing all lives results in a game over, forcing the player to return from their last save point. Most levels contain a midway flag which acts as a save point for that level. Certain levels contain hidden alternative exits leading to a flag pole with a red flag. Reaching this goal opens up a path on the map that leads to a hidden area.

New Super Mario Bros. Wii features "Super Guide", a concept meant to help players who are having difficulty completing a certain level. It is the first Nintendo game to include the concept. During single-player mode, if a player dies eight times in a row in any level, a green "!" Block appears, which can be hit to allow a computer-controlled Luigi to show the player a safe path through the level without revealing any Star Coin locations or secret exits. The player may interrupt the guide at any time and take control of Luigi from that point. After Luigi completes the course, the player has the option to try the level again or skip it completely.

=== Multiplayer ===
New Super Mario Bros. Wii is the first entry in the Super Mario series to feature simultaneous 4-player platforming gameplay. This early screenshot of the game from E3 2009 shows how players are able to pick up and carry each other, as Luigi is doing with Blue Toad.

New Super Mario Bros. Wii is the first Super Mario game to feature simultaneous cooperative multiplayer gameplay. Up to four players, as either Mario, his brother Luigi, Yellow Toad, or Blue Toad, can play through levels together. Stages are completed when one player touches the flag pole; other players have a limited amount of time to grab it in pursuit before the game stops any further input from the players and focuses on the "course clear" animation.

Players can interact with each other in several ways, which can be used to either help or compete with each other; for instance, players can jump on each other's heads to reach higher places. They can also pick up and throw each other, and eat and spit each other out while riding Yoshi. If a large distance forms between two or more characters, the game's camera will compensate by panning out to show all of them at once. If the players still do not catch up, they are then dragged by the edge of the screen until they move forward faster or lose a life via a passing obstacle. If one player enters a different area of a level, such as one enclosed via a warp pipe or a door, without the other players, they will warp to the same place after a short period of time.

The first player navigates the world map and selects stages. Players return to the map screen if they all die before anybody respawns in the stage. If all players run out of lives and get a game over, they must restart from their last save point. If a player dies, they re-emerge in the level encased in a bubble. They can resume play when another player breaks the bubble. A player can break the bubble by touching it, or by hitting it with a fireball, ice ball, a throwable projectile (shells, ice blocks, etc.), and Yoshi's tongue. Players can also voluntarily encase themselves inside the bubble while a more skilled player traverses a difficult segment. If every character in a co-op session enters a bubble at the same time (whether through death or voluntarily), they will lose the level and must restart.

In addition to the main story mode, which can be played in either single-player or multiplayer modes, there are two dedicated multiplayer modes; "Free-for-All Mode", in which players complete courses together and compete to get the highest rank, and "Coin Battle", where they compete to collect the highest number of coins.

== Plot ==
When Mario, Luigi, Yellow Toad, and Blue Toad are celebrating Princess Peach's birthday in her castle, a large cake appears. Bowser Jr. and the Koopalings emerge from the cake and trap Peach inside. The cake is loaded onto Bowser's airship, and it takes off, with Mario, Luigi, and the two Toads giving pursuit. The Toads in the castle grant them access to the new items, the Propeller Mushrooms and Penguin Suits.

After traveling through several worlds fighting the Koopalings, Bowser Jr., and Kamek the Magikoopa, the Mario Bros. and the Toads find Peach on the ship. However, Kamek swoops by and takes her to Bowser's Castle. Inside, Bowser is defeated but is revived by Kamek, who casts a magical spell that transforms him into a giant. Bowser pursues after Mario and the others, destroying everything in his path, until Mario finds a large button and triggers it, causing Bowser to fall through the ground and freeing Peach from her cage. Peach and Mario exit from the castle in a hot-air balloon, with Luigi and the Toads following behind.

At the end of the game, the credits are shown as a minigame where the letters in the credits are written on blocks, which can be broken by the playable characters to get coins (all four characters appear, but only the ones controlled by players can get coins). After the credits, Bowser Jr. and the Koopalings help Bowser out of his unstable castle, which falls over.

== Development ==
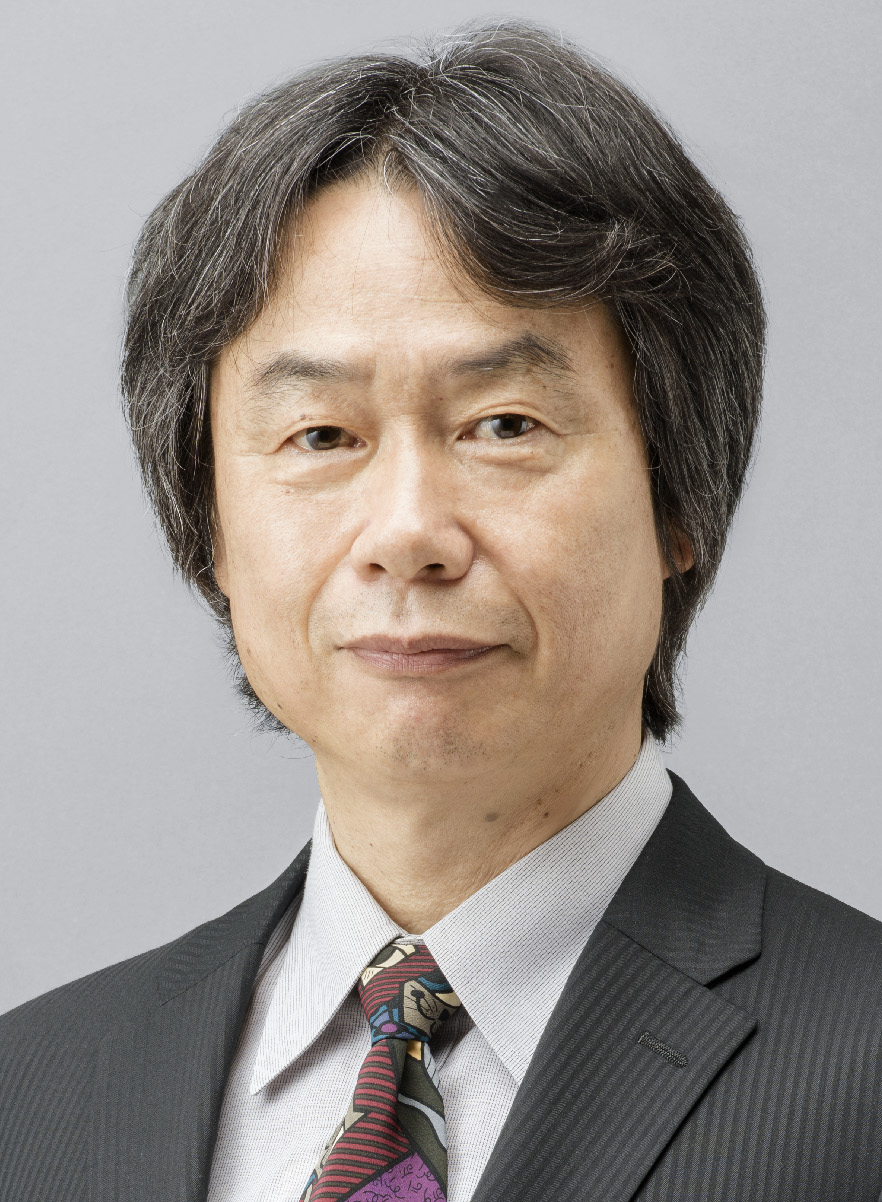
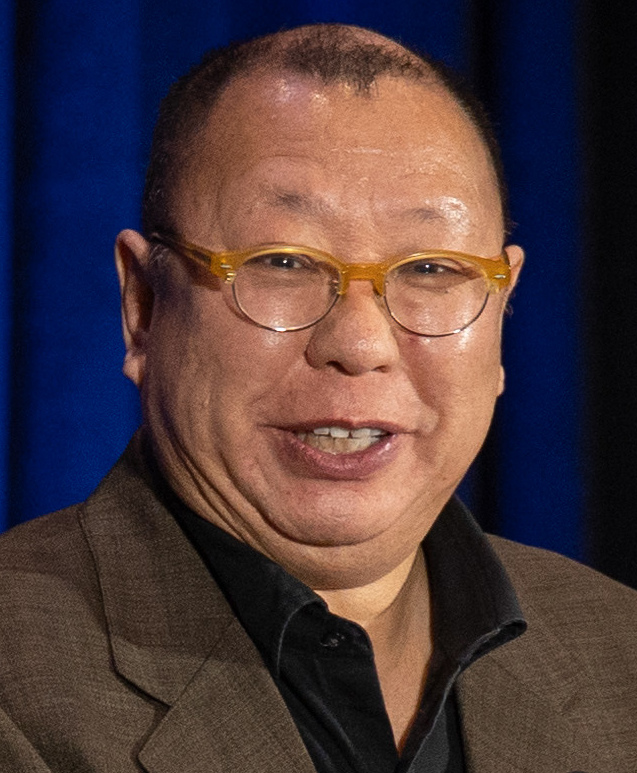
General producer Shigeru Miyamoto (left, pictured in 2015) and producer Takashi Tezuka (right, pictured in 2024)

New Super Mario Bros. Wii was created out of a desire to recreate the Super Mario series' single-player gameplay experience for multiple players. Shigeru Miyamoto, the head game developer at Nintendo, had been interested in creating a Super Mario game with multiplayer features since the series' beginnings with the 1983 arcade game, Mario Bros. Attempts to integrate cooperative multiplayer into Super Mario 64, the first 3D game in the series, ultimately failed due to the hardware limitations of the Nintendo 64. With the faster CPU and enhanced graphical and memory capabilities of the Wii, Miyamoto and the rest of the development team were able to revisit this idea, as the hardware allowed the smooth display of enough enemies and items on the screen at once, and allowed a camera that could dynamically adapt to the players' movements, ensuring they constantly know what is the situation of their character. Miyamoto said that Princess Peach was not a playable character because of her dress, since making her skirt realistically move would require complex dedicated programming.

Following the critical and commercial success of New Super Mario Bros., Miyamoto hoped that the game would turn into a staple game for the Wii and achieve similar levels of success. Miyamoto wanted the game to be accessible to all players, and thus tried to balance its difficulty via features catering both to casual and hardcore Super Mario fans. In response to being questioned if there was anything about New Super Mario Bros. that Miyamoto considered could be improved, he responded that he felt it had not been hard enough in retrospect, and wanted to follow it with a Super Mario game which would provide a higher level of challenge for players who desired one. Simultaneously, the Super Guide feature, which would allow a player to watch a level get completed before trying again after failing a certain number of times, was included with the game in order to make the game accessible to unfamiliar players as well. The Super Guide was first conceived by Miyamoto in a June 2008 patent for a "Kind Code" with three demo play modes: Game, in which, when the player gets stuck during standard gameplay, they can view a walkthrough video that appears in the screen's top right corner; Digest, where the player can watch developer gameplay and join the game at a particular point, but cannot save; and Scene Menu, in which players go directly to specific parts of the game without loading their games or watching the digest. The development team decided to include the feature as an option that would appear in a level after failing a certain number of times to prevent hindering the experience for more experienced players. As an extra incentive for advanced players, the team also added achievements that could be earned by completing the game without making the green Super Guide block appear in those levels. The ability for a player to put themselves into a bubble and opt out of doing a level was devised so that both novice players and more experienced ones could play without interfering with each other.

New Super Mario Bros. Wii was worked on by several developers, some of whom had varying understandings of the design principalities of Super Mario games. Miyamoto, who served as the game's producer, helped the directors out with creating a general understanding of the ground rules for the game's design, writing out specification documents explaining the "rules" of how the game would work. This led to discussions and decisions over what was considered "natural" and "unnatural" for a Mario game; for instance, with the advent of the Ice Flower's ability to freeze enemies, the developers decided that it would be logical for the ice blocks to melt when shot with fireballs, and to float to the surface when submerged in water.

The music for New Super Mario Bros. Wii was composed and arranged by Shiho Fujii and Ryo Nagamatsu, with additional work provided by sound director Kenta Nagata. Series regular Koji Kondo was the sound advisor and did not write any new compositions, though some of his creations were re-arranged for the game. Charles Martinet returned to voice Mario and Luigi, along with Samantha Kelly as the Toads and Princess Peach, Kenny James as Bowser, and Caety Sagoian as Bowser Jr. Miyamoto had conflicting approaches with the development team over the tone for the opening sequence, with the team wanting to make it more dramatic. Miyamoto's idea for the opening was to have ships with chains carry a cake on a plate as bait for Princess Peach.

While the game's playable Toads are unnamed, referred to simply as Blue Toad and Yellow Toad, an uncorroborated claim states that the game's developers reportedly internally referred to the characters as Bucken-Berry and Ala-Gold, respectively.

== Release ==
On May 30, 2009, the online version of the Japanese newspaper Nihon Keizai Shimbun reported that two new sequels would be released for the Wii: a sequel to Wii Fit titled Wii Fit Plus, and a sequel to New Super Mario Bros. tentatively called New Super Mario Bros. Wii. The latter game was announced at E3 2009 and further shown off at Gamescom. To highlight the uniqueness of the game, Nintendo released the game in a red case instead of the traditional white box color that Wii games generally have. The game's announcement came following a standstill in Wii sales, which had led to a 52% drop in Nintendo's first-half earnings for 2009. Nintendo hoped that the game would help to increase sales of the Wii in the coming holiday season. In a Japanese retail briefing event prior to its release, Miyamoto expressed his faith that the game would retain strong sales stretching beyond its first year on the market.

New Super Mario Bros. Wii was released in Australia on November 12, 2009, and in North America on November 15. It was later released in Europe and Japan on November 20 and December 3, respectively. On October 29, 2010, it was released as a pack-in game with a red Wii console, alongside Wii Sports and a built-in download of Donkey Kong, which was released to celebrate the 25th anniversary of Super Mario Bros. It was also included as part of a bundle release with a black Wii Family Edition console alongside a soundtrack CD for Super Mario Galaxy on October 23, 2011.

At E3 2011, a variation of New Super Mario Bros. Wii, dubbed New Super Mario Bros. Mii, was showcased as a playable demo for Nintendo's then-new console, the Wii U, allowing players to play as their Mii characters. It was a prototype designed to showcase the technology of the system.

New Super Mario Bros. Wii was released on the Wii U's Virtual Console in 2016 for the European, Australian and Japanese markets.

An enhanced port of the game was released in China for the Nvidia Shield TV on December 5, 2017, alongside other Wii and GameCube ports such as The Legend of Zelda: Twilight Princess. This updated version of the game features high definition graphics in 1080p and a redesigned UI.

=== Piracy lawsuit ===
In November 2009, 24-year-old Australian James Burt purchased a copy of New Super Mario Bros. Wii several days before its release, as the store had accidentally sold the game before its release date, and ripped and uploaded the game disc online. Nintendo took down the game and sued Burt shortly afterwards, accusing him of violating copyright laws and depriving Nintendo of potential sales. The case was ultimately settled in January 2010, with Burt receiving a fine of AU$1.3 million as compensation for lost sales, as well as an additional fine of AU$100,000 as a part of Nintendo's legal fine. Burt was also forced to disclose the locations of all of his computers and electronic storage devices, as well as give access to his email, social networking and website accounts. Nintendo of Australia managing director Rose Lappin called the incident "a global issue", noting that thousands of copies of the game had been downloaded across the world before it was taken down. Burt later commented on the incident, calling his actions "very stupid" and asserting that the crime's repercussions were something that he would have to deal with for the rest of his life.

== Reception ==
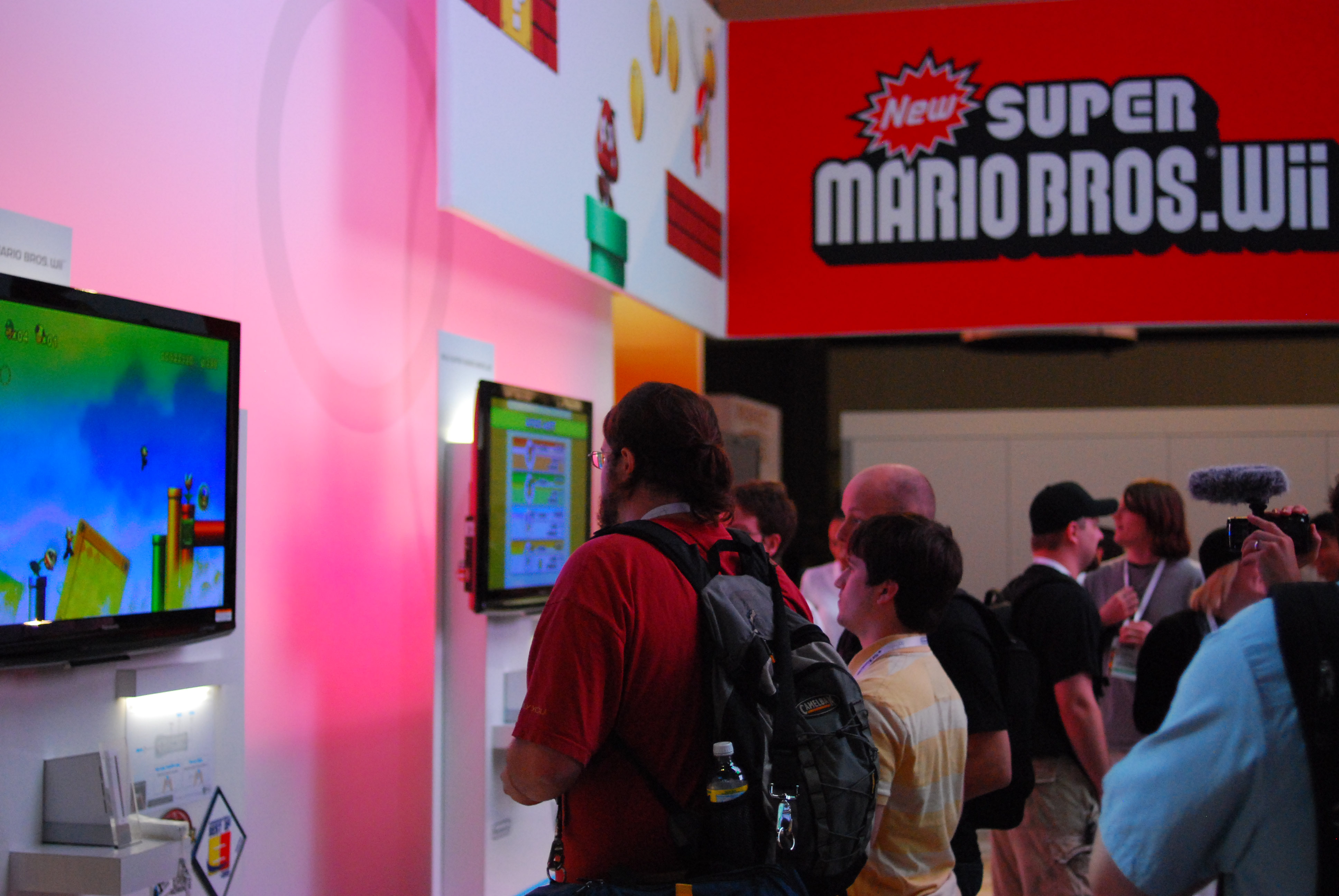
Playable demo booths for New Super Mario Bros. Wii in 2009

=== Pre-release ===
The game received praise for its multiplayer features following its showcase at E3, with critics praising its competitive aspects as well as its cooperative aspects, though the game's lack of online play was criticized as a missed opportunity. Many favorably compared the game to The Legend of Zelda: Four Swords Adventures, which similarly took its respective series' traditional gameplay and interlaced it with cooperative multiplayer. Chad Concelmo of Destructoid praised the game's "creative and giggle-inducing" levels and tighter control compared to New Super Mario Bros., while calling the multiplayer gameplay "unique, addictive, and gloriously entertaining" and giving the game a 9.5 score based on his initial impressions. Engadget's Andrew Yoon called the game "playable, addictive and fresh", and commended the game's camera system that could zoom out automatically to show off-screen players. Ars Technica praised the game as "insidiously fun" despite noting the simplicity of the game's graphics. Sophia Tong of GameSpot compared the game to Super Mario Bros. 3 and called the new multiplayer feature "a blast to play and hilarious to watch". Eurogamer's Oli Welsh called the multiplayer "a simple stroke of genius". Chris Kohler of Wired praised the difficulty behind the multiplayer mode.

The game's presentation was another point of praise for some critics. CNET's Jeff Balakar called seeing a side-scrolling Super Mario game in widescreen "an eye-opening experience", and praised the worlds' attentions to detail. IGN's Craig Harris also praised the widescreen graphics, noting that the game looked smooth in progressive widescreen mode despite the version of the game being displayed being an incomplete build, while Matt Casamassina said that it looked "crisp, clean [and] colorful".

Some reviewers were slightly critical of the game's multiplayer. Although CNET's three reviewers enjoyed the game, Balakar mused that the multiplayer gameplay was occasionally frustrating due to the chaos and tight screen space. CNET's Dan Ackerman, whilst praising New Super Mario Bros. Wii's overall enjoyability, noted its strong similarity to its side-scrolling predecessors, musing that it felt "firmly planted in the 2D era." MTV writer Russ Frushtick commented on the game's difficulty, comparing it to that of the NES game Contra.

=== Post-release ===
Reception

Aggregate scores
Aggregator	Score
GameRankings	88.18%
Metacritic	87/100

Review scores
Publication	Score
1Up.com	A+
Destructoid	9/10
Edge	7/10
Eurogamer	9/10
Famitsu	40/40
Game Informer	9.25/10
GameSpot	8.5/10
GameSpy	4.5/5
GamesRadar+	3.5/5
GameTrailers	8.9/10
Giant Bomb	4/5
IGN	(US) 8.9/10 (UK) 9.4/10 (AUS) 9.2/10
Nintendo Life	10/10
Nintendo Power	9/10
Nintendo World Report	9.5/10
Official Nintendo Magazine	96%
VideoGamer.com	8/10
X-Play	4/5
The A.V. Club	C+

The game received "generally favorable" reviews, according to review aggregator website Metacritic. Japanese gaming magazine Famitsu called it a "masterpiece of 2D action" and gave it a perfect 40/40, making it the 13th game and the fourth Wii game to receive this score in the publication's 23-year history. Kotaku highly praised the game, calling it a reason to buy a Wii. Jeremy Parish of 1UP.com regarded it as the "true sequel" to 1991's Super Mario World due to being a home console title with multiplayer capabilities. Jeff Gerstmann of Giant Bomb also praised the game for its balance of difficulty, lauding that it was easy and accessible for both hardcore and casual gamers, though he noted that its ease made it less challenging than Super Mario Bros. 3 and Super Mario World.

Critics continued to praise the game's multiplayer features, with several singling it out as one of the game's most potent and worthwhile features. Patrick Kolan of IGN Australia called it the most fun 4-player experience since Super Smash Bros. Brawl, and stated that it exceeded their initial expectations despite strong suspicions. Matt Wales of IGN UK lamented that the game worked as both a single-player and a multiplayer experience, but stated that it was at its best when played with multiple people. Nick Chester of Destructoid called the cooperative mode fun despite occasional frustrations, and stated that players would likely have more fun playing alongside other friends. GameSpot's Randolph Ramsay called the multiplayer "initially great fun", but also admitted that they found it tedious at times due to the sheer chaos that it led to. Craig Harris of IGN US praised the bubble system, calling it a smart design choice; however, he criticized the game's lack of any online multiplayer features, highlighting it as a particular point of dissatisfaction. Kolan also saw this as a shortcoming, criticizing a lack of online leaderboard features for the competitive multiplayer modes. Conversely, Wales did not see this omission as a major issue, arguing that sociality was a primary aspect that made the multiplayer enjoyable and that it was wise not to include the feature because of Nintendo's poor-quality online service, though they noted that a leaderboard would have been an admirable addition. GameSpy also gave the game leeway for its lack of online play, arguing that the medium is a primarily competitive experience whereas New Super Mario Bros. Wii required a cooperative experience in order to be thoroughly enjoyed. Brett Elston of GamesRadar+, highly critical of the four-player multiplayer, called it frustrating and stated that it felt cramped due to the several characters and small screen size, while advising that the game was best experienced with only two players.

Gameplay and controls were praised for their reminiscence of older 2D Super Mario titles; many singled out the use of the Wii Remote held sideways as the best way to play the game and praised it for calling back to the layout of the rectangular-shaped controller of the Nintendo Entertainment System. Ramsay lamented that the game's lack of support for the Wii's Classic Controller was disappointing. Thoughts on the game's integration of motion controls were varied. Kolan praised them as being "easy, intuitive and unobtrusive – the three most critical aspects in any motion-controlled game", while Ramsay stated that they were occasionally intrusive on general gameplay. Chester mostly praised the motion controls for being natural, taking exception with the need to hold a button and shake in order to carry items. Elston stated that the game's handling was "compromised" by the motion-controlled spin jump, which they stated the review team kept repeatedly activating by accident while trying to play the game.

Some writers criticized New Super Mario Bros. Wii for feeling streamlined and banking off of the gameplay of its predecessors. Although Harris awarded the game an 8.9 out of 10 and deemed it a fun experience overall, he also was highly critical of it for "playing it safe", and, comparing it to Super Mario Galaxy, called it a "missed opportunity" for Nintendo in terms of content. Edge, while giving the game a positive score of 7/10, criticized it for having a lack of traditional Mario charm and low difficulty level. Elston argued that the game lacked the creativity of others in the series. The A.V. Club called the game "the least essential Mario title to date", stating that it lacks a strong concept and shows an underlying repetitiveness in Mario games. Conversely, Nintendo Power argued that the game works as a sequel because it maintains what made the original Mario games great while adding new features.

Corbie Dillard of Nintendo Life pointed out the game's visual polish and smooth animations, but also stated that it did not hold the same level of splendor as other first party Wii releases. Ramsay also compared the game's graphics to other Nintendo-developed titles, stating that it lacked the level of polish that the previously released Super Mario Galaxy had despite using a bright and varied array of colors. Gerstmann observed that while the game's player models were slightly unusual up close, the strong colors of the worlds and levels only made it a minor annoyance. Kolan praised the game's music as one of the best in the series, and lauded the game's sound design for calling back to previous Super Mario entries. Elston also shed praise on the game's soundtrack, as well as the enemy interaction with the in-game music.

New Super Mario Bros. Wii received the Best Wii Game award at the 2009 Spike Video Game Awards. IGN gave it the 2009 Wii Game of the Year Award. GameTrailers awarded it Best Wii Game of 2009. It also received the Best Family Game of the Year award in Yahoo's 2009 Game Awards, and the Nintendo Power Award for 2009's "Wii Game of the Year". During the 13th Annual Interactive Achievement Awards, the Academy of Interactive Arts & Sciences nominated New Super Mario Bros. Wii for "Adventure Game of the Year" and "Outstanding Achievement in Gameplay Engineering". GamesRadar named the game the 13th best on the Wii in 2016. IGN listed it as #8 on their list of the top 25 Wii games in 2012, and also as #103 on their list of the top 125 Nintendo games of all time in 2014. Polygon placed it at the #10 spot in their ranking of every Super Mario game, stating that the game's single-player was "standard Mario fare" while singling out the multiplayer experience as an incredible inclusion.

=== Sales ===
New Super Mario Bros. Wii was a commercial success, selling 936,734 units within four days of its release in Japan, the biggest debut for a Wii game in the region; its sales increased to 1,401,558 in the following week. Upon the game's release, sales for the Wii console increased by 128%, following a recent slowing in hardware sales for the system. New Super Mario Bros. Wii sold 3,002,753 units within seven weeks of its release in Japan, making it the fastest game in that country to sell 3 million. In North America, New Super Mario Bros. Wii sold 1,390,000 units in November 2009, making it the third-best-selling game of the month behind the Xbox 360 and PlayStation 3 versions of Call of Duty: Modern Warfare 2. Within 45 days, the game had sold 4.2 million copies in the US, surpassing Super Mario Galaxy's 4.1 million sales. In December 2009, the game sold 2.82 million units. By the end of 2009, New Super Mario Bros. Wii had sold 10.55 million units worldwide, making it the fastest selling single-system game in history, with 4.5 million units sold in the U.S., 3 million in Japan, and nearly 3 million in Europe.

In its first year of sales, New Super Mario Bros. Wii sold 4,001,276 units in Japan, making it the first Wii title with 4 million sales in the country. On November 19, 2014, Nintendo of America announced via Twitter that the game had surpassed sales of 10 million units in the United States alone. As of March 31, 2022, the game has sold 30.32 million copies worldwide, making it the fourth-best-selling Wii game as well as the second-best-selling Mario game on the Wii console (behind Mario Kart Wii).

== Sequel ==
In 2012, a sequel to New Super Mario Bros. Wii was released as a launch title for the Wii U, entitled New Super Mario Bros. U. It was later re-released for the Nintendo Switch in 2019, titled New Super Mario Bros. U Deluxe, including New Super Luigi U, an expansion pack which was available as paid DLC on the Wii U's Nintendo eShop and later as retail version.

=== New Super Mario Bros. Wii Coin World ===
New Super Mario Bros. Wii Coin World (Japanese: New スーパーマリオブラザーズ Wii コインワールド, Hepburn: Nyū Sūpā Mario Burazāzu U~ī Koin Wārudo) is a 2011 Japan-only arcade game developed by Capcom. The gameplay features multiplayer like its console counterpart, and is based primarily on a slot-machine mechanic. The game features a variety of "event" elements, each based upon gameplay from New Super Mario Bros. Wii. Winning various events and on the slot machine gives players opportunities to collect keys. Once five keys are collected, the player enters an event with Bowser to win a jackpot.
