= Beausire =

Beausire is a surname. Notable people with the surname include:

- Jean Beausire (1651–1743), French architect, engineer and fountain-maker
- William Beausire (born 1948), British stockbroker

== See also ==
- Bowser (surname), an Anglicized form of the surname
