= Super Mario Sunshine =

2002 video game

- North American box art
- Developer: Nintendo EAD
- Publisher: Nintendo
- Directors: Yoshiaki Koizumi; Kenta Usui
- Producers: Shigeru Miyamoto; Takashi Tezuka
- Designer: Futoshi Shirai
- Programmer: Koichi Hayashida
- Writer: Makoto Wada
- Composers: Koji Kondo; Shinobu Tanaka
- Series: Super Mario
- Platform: GameCube
- Release: JP: July 19, 2002; NA: August 26, 2002; EU: October 4, 2002; AU: October 11, 2002
- Genres: Platform, action-adventure
- Mode: Single-player

Super Mario Sunshine (Note: Japanese: スーパーマリオサンシャイン, Hepburn: Sūpā Mario Sanshain) is a 2002 platform game developed and published by Nintendo for the GameCube. It is the second 3D game in the Super Mario series, following Super Mario 64 (1996). The game was directed by Yoshiaki Koizumi and Kenta Usui, produced by series creators Shigeru Miyamoto and Takashi Tezuka, written by Makoto Wada, and scored by Koji Kondo and Shinobu Tanaka.

The game takes place on the tropical Isle Delfino, where Mario, Toadsworth, Princess Peach, and five Toads are taking a vacation. A villain resembling Mario, known as Shadow Mario, vandalizes the island with graffiti and causes Mario to be wrongfully convicted for the mess. Mario is ordered to clean up Isle Delfino, using a device called the Flash Liquidizer Ultra Dousing Device (F.L.U.D.D.), while saving Princess Peach from Shadow Mario.

Super Mario Sunshine received critical acclaim, with reviewers praising the game's graphics, gameplay, story, soundtrack, and the addition of F.L.U.D.D. as a mechanic. However, some criticized the game's camera, F.L.U.D.D.'s gimmicky nature, the high difficulty of some of the missions, and the decision to use full voice acting for some characters. The game sold over five million copies worldwide by 2006, making it one of the best-selling GameCube games. The game was re-released as a part of the Player's Choice brand in 2003. It was re-released alongside Super Mario 64 and Super Mario Galaxy in the Super Mario 3D All-Stars collection for the Nintendo Switch in 2020. The game was re-released for Nintendo Switch 2 as part of the Nintendo Classics service on Nintendo Switch Online on August 13, 2026.

== Gameplay ==
Super Mario Sunshine is a platformer and action-adventure game. It shares many gameplay elements with its predecessor, Super Mario 64, while introducing several new features. Players control Mario as he collects 120 Shine Sprites to bring light back to Isle Delfino and prove his innocence after Bowser Jr. disguises himself as Mario, steals the Shine Sprites, and covers the island in toxic slime. Players start off in the hub world of Delfino Plaza and access various worlds via portals which become available as the game progresses. Like Stars in Super Mario 64, players obtain Shine Sprites by clearing selected missions with specific objectives. Unlike its predecessor, these missions have a more strictly linear order and most mission Shine Sprites cannot be collected until previous missions are completed. There are also various hidden areas and challenges across Isle Delfino where more Shine Sprites can be obtained. Throughout the game, players can find Blue Coins hidden across Isle Delfino, which can be exchanged for Shine Sprites in the boathouse at Delfino Plaza.

Mario using the Hover Nozzle

In this game, Mario is joined by a robotic backpack named F.L.U.D.D. (Flash Liquidizer Ultra Dousing Device), which uses the power of water to clean goop and help Mario reach new places. Mario starts with two default nozzles for F.L.U.D.D., Squirt and Hover, which he can switch between. The Squirt nozzle lets Mario spray a stream of water, which he can use to clean sludge, attack enemies, and activate certain mechanisms. The Hover nozzle lets Mario hover in the air for a short period of time, allowing him to cross large gaps while simultaneously spraying things directly below him. As the game progresses, Mario unlocks two additional nozzles for F.L.U.D.D. which can be substituted with the Hover nozzle: the Rocket nozzle, which shoots Mario high up into the air; and the Turbo nozzle, which moves Mario at high speeds, allowing him to run across water and break into certain areas. Each of F.L.U.D.D.'s nozzles use water from its reserves, which can be refilled via water sources such as rivers or fountains. There are also various secret courses where F.L.U.D.D. is taken away from Mario, forcing him to rely on his natural platforming abilities. Unlike Super Mario 64, Mario cannot long jump; he can instead perform a spin jump by twirling the analog stick and jumping, allowing him to jump higher and farther. Mario can also perform dives at any time, giving him the ability to slide quickly across wet surfaces.

Super Mario Sunshine is the first 3D Super Mario game with the ability to ride Yoshi. At certain points, Mario can come across an egg which hatches into a Yoshi after being given a specific type of fruit. Yoshi can be ridden upon and attack by spitting juice, which can clear certain obstacles that water cannot. Yoshi can also use his tongue to eat enemies or other pieces of fruit which change his color, depending on the type of fruit. Yoshi will disappear if he runs out of juice or falls into deep water; juice can be replenished by eating more fruit.

== Plot ==
Mario visits the tropical Isle Delfino for a vacation with Princess Peach, her steward Toadsworth, and several other Toads. At Delfino Airstrip, they discover a mass of paint-like goop. After acquiring the Flash Liquidizer Ultra Dousing Device (F.L.U.D.D.), a water cannon created by Professor E. Gadd, Mario defeats a slime-covered Piranha Plant that emerges from the goop. However, evidence incriminates Mario of vandalizing the island with graffiti, causing the source of the island's power, Shine Sprites, to disappear and the island to be covered in shadow. Despite evidence contrary to the situation, and Peach and Toadsworth serving as Mario's defense team, the judge for the kangaroo court finds Mario guilty. Mario is later given a community service assignment: cleaning up the island and tracking the real criminal.

The culprit is revealed to be Shadow Mario, a shadowy blue doppelgänger of Mario who created the graffiti using a special paintbrush also developed by Gadd. He attempts to kidnap Princess Peach, but is thwarted by Mario. After the player collects ten Shine Sprites, Shadow Mario successfully kidnaps Peach and takes her to Pinna Island. Upon arriving at Pinna Park, a theme park on the island, Mario encounters and destroys Mecha Bowser, a giant Bowser robot controlled by Shadow Mario. Afterwards, Bowser Jr., Bowser's son, reveals that he disguised himself as Shadow Mario to vandalize the island because his father, Bowser, told him Peach is his mother, whom Mario was trying to kidnap. Mecha Bowser's head then transforms into a hot air balloon and Bowser Jr. takes Peach to Corona Mountain. With no way to enter the volcano, Mario continues his mission collecting Shine Sprites.

After the player defeats Bowser Jr. in his Shadow Mario disguise in the seven main levels, Delfino Plaza floods and the entrance to Corona Mountain is finally opened. Mario travels through the lava-filled caverns and finds Bowser, Bowser Jr. and Princess Peach in a giant hot tub in the sky. Mario defeats Bowser and Bowser Jr. by destroying the hot tub, causing everyone to fall from the sky. Bowser and Bowser Jr. land on a platform in the ocean, while Mario and Peach land on a small island. However, F.L.U.D.D. is damaged by the fall and powers down. Mario and Peach watch as the Shine Gate's power is restored while the island locals celebrate, and Mario is exonerated. Meanwhile, Bowser admits to his son that Peach is not his mother, but Bowser Jr. replies that he already knows and wants to fight Mario again when he is older, which makes Bowser proud. F.L.U.D.D. is repaired, and Mario, Peach, and their friends enjoy the rest of their vacation.

== Development ==
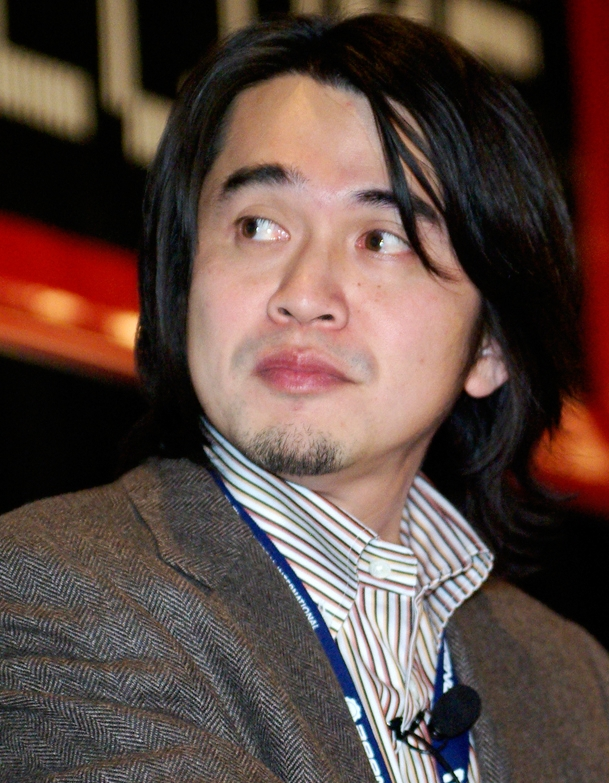
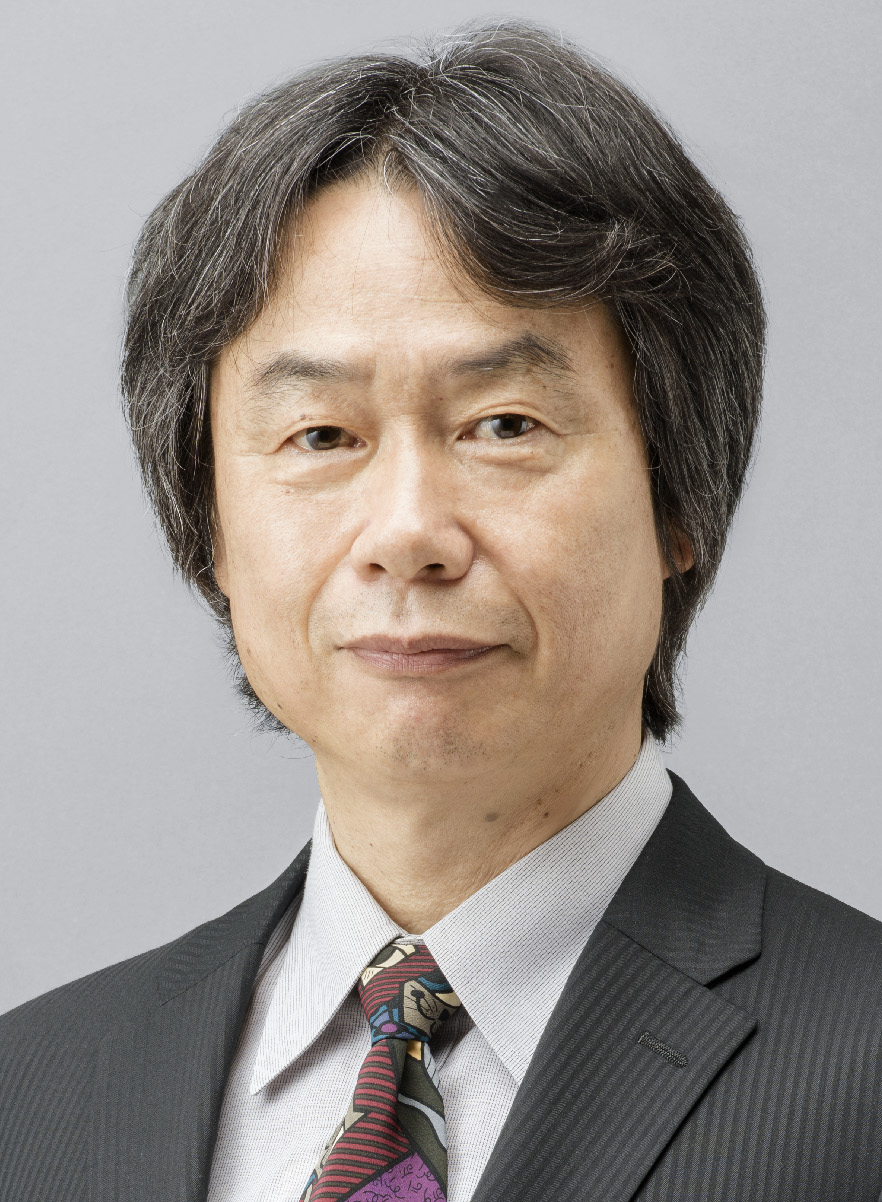
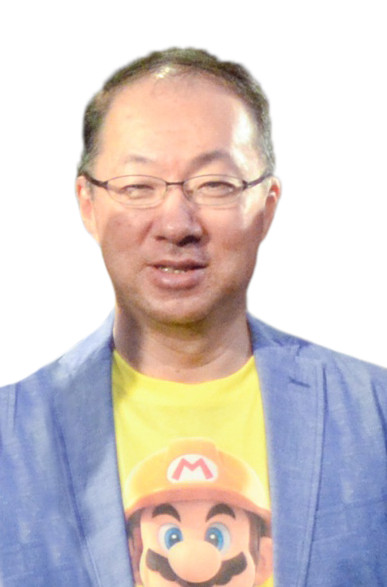
The director, co-producer and composer in 2007, 2015, and 2015, respectively: Yoshiaki Koizumi, Shigeru Miyamoto, and Koji Kondo.

A sequel to Super Mario 64 had been in development for several years; the canceled games Super Mario 64 2/Super Mario 128 were some ideas Nintendo had for a direct sequel. Super Mario Sunshine was first shown at Nintendo Space World 2001. The game was later shown again at E3 2002. It was developed by Nintendo EAD.

The game was the first lead directing role for Nintendo designer Yoshiaki Koizumi following a ten-year-long apprenticeship working on various other games. Super Mario creators Shigeru Miyamoto and Takashi Tezuka served as producers. It was the first Nintendo first-party game after Satoru Iwata became president of Nintendo, succeeding Hiroshi Yamauchi. Developing a Mario game for the GameCube was the last request Yamauchi gave the team before resigning. In an interview about the development of Super Mario Sunshine with Koizumi, Kenta Usui, and Tezuka, it was mentioned that the game's development began in late 2000–after showing Super Mario 128 and following the critical and commercial success of The Legend of Zelda: Majora's Mask–when Koizumi conceived the idea of gameplay involving a water pump. The game took nearly 18 months to complete. However, at first Koizumi, Miyamoto and Tezuka thought that the world was too daringly out of character with Mario. When focusing on the premise and gameplay, Koizumi took inspiration from his childhood memories–such as the experience of a hero jumping from rooftop to rooftop, playing in water, and enjoying the coolness on his skin. There were ten candidates for possible water nozzles, and F.L.U.D.D. was chosen because of fitting in the game's setting, though it was not one of the favorites. They also stated that several Yoshi features were omitted, such as Yoshi vomiting water fed to him. During a press event at E3 2001, Miyamoto stated that for this 3D entry, he wanted the Super Mario franchise to appeal to a "very wide range of ages," as he slowly changed his design over time since he thought it was "a little too much to a strictly younger age".

Koji Kondo and Shinobu Tanaka composed the score to Super Mario Sunshine. Kondo composed the main motif for Isle Delfino, Bianco Hills, Ricco Harbor, and Gelato Beach, as well as the ending credits, while additional music was composed by Tanaka. The soundtrack features various arrangements of classic Mario tunes, including the underground music and the main stage music from the original Super Mario Bros.

Super Mario Sunshine features many of the usual voice actors for the various Mario characters. Charles Martinet voices Mario, Jen Taylor voices Princess Peach and Toad, Kit Harris voices F.L.U.D.D. and the female Nokis, Scott Burns voices Bowser in the character's first speaking role in a video game, he also voiced Toadsworth, the male Nokis, the male Piantas, and Dolores Rogers voices Bowser Jr. and the female Piantas. Unlike most games of the series, the cutscenes in Super Mario Sunshine feature full English voice acting.

== Release ==
Super Mario Sunshine was released in Japan on July 18, 2002. It was later released in the United States on August 26 of that year. A GameCube bundle containing the game along with a GameCube console was released in North America on October 14, 2002. The game was re-released alongside Super Mario 64 (1996) and Super Mario Galaxy (2007) in the Super Mario 3D All-Stars collection on Nintendo Switch on September 18, 2020. It was later released as part of Nintendo Classics for the Nintendo Switch 2 on August 13, 2026.

== Reception ==
Reception

Aggregate scores
Aggregator	Score
GameRankings	91.50%
Metacritic	92/100

Review scores
Publication	Score
1Up.com	A
AllGame	3.5/5
Computer and Video Games	10/10
Edge	9/10
Electronic Gaming Monthly	9.5/10
Eurogamer	9/10
Famitsu	9/10, 9/10, 9/10, 10/10
Game Informer	9.75/10
GameSpot	8/10
GameSpy	5/5
GamesRadar+	4.5/5
IGN	9.4/10
Nintendo Life	9/10
Nintendo Power	5/5, 5/5, 5/5, 5/5, 5/5
Nintendo World Report	10/10

Super Mario Sunshine was critically acclaimed by game critics and fans. Particular praise went towards the graphics, music, story, gameplay and the addition of F.L.U.D.D. IGN praised the addition of the water backpack for improving gameplay, and GameSpy commented on the "wide variety of moves and the beautifully constructed environments". The game received a perfect score from Nintendo Power, who wrote that the game has "superb graphics, excellent music, clever layouts, funny cinema scenes and ingenious puzzles".

Super Mario Sunshine won GameSpot's annual "Best Platformer on GameCube" award. GamePro gave it a perfect score, stating that the game was "a masterpiece of superior game design, infinite gameplay variety, creativity, and life." The American-based publication Game Informer said that the game is arguably "the best Mario game to date." Computer and Video Games also mentioned the game is "better than Super Mario 64." The game placed 46th in Official Nintendo Magazine's 100 greatest Nintendo games of all time. AllGame gave a lower review, stating that "During the six-year span between Super Mario 64 and Super Mario Sunshine, platform games have become more epic, more interactive, and prettier. Yet the core element of collecting items in a world divided into sub-sections has been left unchanged. So it comes with a modicum of disappointment that Super Mario Sunshine doesn't shake up the genre with a number of new and fresh ideas other than the usual enhancements expected from a sequel."

Some reviewers were critical towards certain aspects of the game. The camera system and high difficulty were the most criticized aspects of the game. The decision to use full voice acting for some characters in the game, as well as F.L.U.D.D., received mixed responses. GameSpot's Jeff Gerstmann criticized the various additions, including F.L.U.D.D. and Yoshi, calling them "mere gimmicks". He also complained about the camera system. Gerstmann said that the game seemed somewhat unpolished and rushed, a sentiment shared by Matt Wales of Computer and Video Games. GameSpot named it 2002's most disappointing GameCube game. During the 6th Annual Interactive Achievement Awards, the Academy of Interactive Arts & Sciences nominated Super Mario Sunshine for "Console Platform Action/Adventure Game of the Year".

=== Sales ===
In Japan, more than 400,000 copies of Super Mario Sunshine were sold within four days. In the United States, more than 350,000 copies were sold within its first ten days of release, surpassing launch sales of the PlayStation 2's Grand Theft Auto III, the Xbox's Halo, and the Nintendo 64's Super Mario 64, and boosting hardware sales of the GameCube. In Europe, 175,000 units were sold within a week of its release. In Japan, 624,240 units had been sold by October 2002. In 2002, Super Mario Sunshine was the tenth best-selling game in the United States according to the NPD Group. It was re-released in 2003 as part of the Player's Choice line, a selection of games with high sales sold for a reduced price. By July 2006, 2.5 million copies were sold for $85 million, in the United States alone. Next Generation ranked it as the ninth highest-selling game launched for the PlayStation 2, Xbox, or GameCube between January 2000 and July 2006 in that country. By June 2006, over 5.5 million copies had been sold worldwide. However, Satoru Iwata confirmed at E3 2003 that the game's sales, along with those of Metroid Prime, had failed to live up to the company's expectations.

== Legacy ==
Super Mario Sunshine introduced several elements that were carried over into subsequent Mario games and other related media. Many of the bosses appear in Mario spin-offs that followed on the GameCube, such as in Mario Kart: Double Dash!! and Mario Golf: Toadstool Tour.

Bowser Jr. became a major recurring character in the franchise, appearing in many mainline and spin-off games,, as well as the Super Smash Bros. series and The Super Mario Galaxy Movie. The characters Petey Piranha, King Boo, and Toadsworth would also become recurring characters. The Super Smash Bros. series has numerous references to original elements of Super Mario Sunshine; most notably, F.L.U.D.D. has been featured as a part of Mario's moveset since Super Smash Bros. Brawl. Piantas have also appeared in other media, including as a racer in Mario Kart World and cameos in The Super Mario Galaxy Movie.'Super Mario Sunshine introduced the Shine Sprites, which appeared in Mario games such as Mario Kart DS and Paper Mario: The Thousand-Year Door.

In a 2002 interview, Miyamoto said he regretted that Super Mario Sunshine "turned out to be difficult for the average user", explaining he felt that anyone in the family should be able to play a Nintendo game. He also reflected that, in retrospect, he would have wanted to allow players to skip the secret courses.
