= Bowser Jr. =

Video game character

- Mario character
- First game: Super Mario Sunshine (2002)
- Created by: Shigeru Miyamoto
- Voiced by: English: Dolores Rogers (2002–2006); Caety Sagoian (2007–present); Benny Safdie (The Super Mario Galaxy Movie); Japanese: Daiki Yamashita (The Super Mario Galaxy Movie)

In-universe information
- Nickname: Junior
- Species: Koopa
- Family: Bowser (father)

Bowser Jr., known in Japan as Koopa Jr. (Japanese: クッパJr., Hepburn: Kuppa Junia), and additionally known simply as Junior, is a character from the Mario franchise by Nintendo who was introduced in the 2002 video game Super Mario Sunshine. He is the son of the series' main antagonist, Bowser, and serves as the secondary antagonist of the series himself. Bowser Jr. is a recurring character in the Mario franchise, having been featured in many of its mainline games, spinoffs and other media. He is the prince of his father's kingdom and a misguided yet intelligent child prodigy who is skilled in magic, technology and inventing or creating machines. Because of his father's influence, he often aids his father in his evil plots, but mainly because he is a young child who wants to make his father proud.

Bowser Jr. has additionally been a subject of critical discussion among video game journalists, with particular focus on his role in the games and his dynamic with Bowser.

== Development and design ==
Bowser Jr.'s emblem

Bowser Jr. is a bipedal turtle-like creature with a yellow body, a beige snout and a green shell with spikes. The upper portion of his head is green-colored with small horns. His head is proportionally large and features black eyes, thick eyebrows and a wide mouth with a visible fang. A tuft of hair extends upward from the top of his head. He wears black wristbands, in addition to a white bandana around his neck displaying a printed design of a jagged mouth. Bowser Jr.'s childlike design resembles that of Bowser's when he was a child, although the major difference between the two is that Bowser was never seen with an artistic bandana.

Originally, Bowser's children were assumed to be the Koopalings. However, in 2012, the creator of the Mario franchise, Shigeru Miyamoto, revealed that Bowser Jr. is the sole child of Bowser, and his mother's identity is unknown. When asked in 2015 about the identity of Bowser Jr.'s mother, Miyamoto humorously claimed it to be himself.

Retrospectively discussing Bowser Jr.'s Journey, the development team said that they chose to focus on Bowser Jr. because in a previous game Goomba was the protagonist, a character who is faithful to Bowser, and in the earlier game Bowser's Inside Story, where Bowser himself was the protagonist; the team thought Bowser Jr. would match the appeal, in contrast to the aforementioned characters and be a suitable choice for a follow-up. The team wanted to show his development from growing up in his father's shadow to becoming a leader of a gang, whom he cherishes. The team rewrote the game script multiple times to make him relatable to the audience. Game director Shunsuke Kobayashi stated that prior the character had appeared occasionally as a prankster archetype through the Mario franchise, and the story in Bowser Jr.'s Journey was meant to reflect him dealing with growing up while still looking up to his father, and wanted their relationship to be something parents could see themselves reflected in when playing the game with their children. However, since the game was focused on the hardship of Bowser Jr., who is a child, the team experienced difficulties balancing the intensity of his suffering to avoid giving a regretful feeling to players for him.

In an exclusive Fandango interview conducted by actress Nikki Novak with the voice cast of The Super Mario Galaxy Movie, Benny Safdie discussed his portrayal of Bowser Jr., commenting on how he had approached the idea of playing a spoiled, angry child obsessed with his father. Additionally, Safdie emphasized the bonding scenes between Bowser and Bowser Jr. with dialogues such as "Oh, daddy" and "Oh, daddy, please" as his favourite moments from the film, which he found humorous and rehearsed with his children to make the relationship feel more natural.

== Appearances ==
=== Super Mario series ===
Bowser Jr. first appeared in Super Mario Sunshine in 2002. Using an enhanced bandana bearing the likeness of Mario's mustache, he is able to shapeshift into a duplicate of Mario dubbed "Shadow Mario" in order to frame the real plumber for making messes around Isle Delfino with graffiti and stealing the Shine Sprites that provide sunlight for the island. While Mario is occupied with cleaning up the graffiti and recovering the Shine Sprites, Bowser Jr. kidnaps Princess Peach, having been told by Bowser that she is his long-lost mother and that Mario has kidnapped her. After Mario catches up to the Bowsers at their airborne hot tub and destroys it, foiling their plans, Bowser Jr. reveals to his father that he already knows Peach is not really his mother, but looks forward to fighting Mario again when he is older, thus making Bowser proud.

In Bowser's Fury, Bowser Jr., with his personally-modified clown car and reinvented-on-his-own magic paintbrush, plays the role of accompanying Mario on his journey. In the game, Bowser Jr. can help him in ways like confronting enemies, collecting extra coins, breaking hidden blocks, retaining power-ups for Mario, and uncovering secrets through his paintbrush. Although there are in-game options that can limit his interference.

The character is present in many other Super Mario titles, often as a boss level. The character appeared in New Super Mario Bros., New Super Mario Bros. Wii, Super Mario Galaxy 2, New Super Mario Bros. U, and Super Mario Bros. Wonder.

=== Other games ===
Like most of the main Mario cast, Bowser Jr. appears in a number of spin-off series, including Mario Kart, Mario Golf, Mario Tennis, Mario Party, and Mario and Sonic at the Olympic Games.^{[A]}

Bowser Jr. also appears in the Paper Mario and Mario & Luigi series, first appearing in Paper Mario: Sticker Star and Mario & Luigi: Dream Team respectively. The character received a dedicated side story, Bowser Jr.'s Journey, in the Nintendo 3DS remake of Mario & Luigi: Bowser's Inside Story.

Bowser Jr. appears as a playable fighter in the Super Smash Bros. franchise, debuting in Super Smash Bros. for Nintendo 3DS and Wii U.

In Yoshi and the Mysterious Book, Bowser Jr. appears as one of the bosses in the game.

=== Other media ===
Bowser Jr. is voiced by Benny Safdie in The Super Mario Galaxy Movie, serving as one of the two main antagonists (alongside his father), and with a mission to rescue his kidnapped father. He also appears in a modernized design inspired by his Super Mario Bros. Wonder look, featuring a mechanized voice, metallic armor, and a transformable paintbrush capable of shifting into a chained morning star.

== Critical reception ==
=== Character portrayal ===
Jenni Lada of Siliconera described Bowser Jr.'s role in the Bowser Jr.'s Journey game as an enjoyable protagonist. Lada felt that he often draws attention with his playful and bratty behavior, motivated by a desire to make his father proud. She stated that he can be mischievous and annoying at times, but is not truly evil, and the game shows him trying to do the right thing. Lada considered Bowser Jr. to be determined and impatient, often insisting on his own way, but showing moments of innocence and naivety that could be amusing. She felt that Bowser Jr.'s "my way or the highway" approach suited the game, which she believed sometimes feel like the player is brute-forcing their way through it, particularly since he realizes that his approach is not effective and would disappoint his father. Ethan Gach, writing for Kotaku, stated that after playing Bowser Jr.'s Journey, he felt the game meaningfully fleshed out Bowser Jr.'s characterization. He observed that the story presents Bowser as a flawed parent attempting to balance the responsibilities of ruling a kingdom with raising a troubled child, while also depicting Bowser Jr. facing challenges following his father's sudden absence.

Nadia Oxford from USgamer offered an assessment of Bowser Jr.'s reputation among Nintendo fans while reviewing Bowser Jr.'s Journey. Oxford stated that, unlike multiple Nintendo characters, Bowser Jr. has often been met with apathy or dislike, particularly from long-time fans who viewed him as a replacement for the franchise's Koopalings following Nintendo's revision of their status as subordinates of Bowser and his son. Oxford started liking Bowser Jr., especially due to the affectionate dynamic with Bowser seen in promotional material like the "Parental Controls" advertising of Nintendo Switch. In reference to Bowser Jr.'s Journey, Oxford suggested that Nintendo appeared aware of the character's contested popularity and set the narrative around him. Oxford praised the narrative for successfully softening Bowser Jr.'s image and cited it as a good example of strong character writing.

Holly Green, writing for The A.V. Club, criticized the depiction of Bowser Jr. in Bowser's Fury, observing how he had to ask his main enemy, Mario, for assistance in order to reach his aggressive father in the narrative. She said that this kind of storytelling is disturbing for a children's game and conveyed that this was not the first time she had felt worried about Bowser Jr., citing a possibility of Princess Peach being his mother, which she described as "logistically is horrifying in more ways than one". She concluded, "I'm rooting for Bowser Jr. No one should have to consult an adult, much less one of their mortal enemies, to reign a parent with an anger problem. You're a brat, Bowser Jr., but you deserve a better father".

In November 2025, the design of Bowser Jr., particularly his bloodshot eyes in The Super Mario Galaxy Movie, drew attention. Kotaku journalist Kenneth Shepard, commenting on the film's promotional trailer, observed that the depiction of Bowser Jr. featured bloodshot eyes, contrasting with the franchise's usual stylized designs. Shepard suggested that the exaggerated eye design may serve as an artistic device reflecting fatigue or emotional instability, and noted that viewers found it unsettling. He questioned whether the design would remain unchanged before release, comparing it to the pre-release redesign of Sonic the Hedgehog in Paramount Pictures' 2020 film adaptation. GameSpot journalist Lan Pitts expressed similar concerns. Jenna Anderson of The Mary Sue stated that she possesses maternal instincts towards Bowser Jr. and selects him as her main character to play throughout the Mario franchise games. Ever since the release of 2023's The Super Mario Bros. Movie, Anderson said that she was eagerly waiting for Bowser Jr.'s casting in The Super Mario Galaxy Movie, with Jack Black's "over-the-top" voice of Bowser in consideration, fan-made concepts for Bowser Jr.'s voice included personalities like Kevin Hart, The Rizzler, and Tim Robinson. In contrast, she said that Benny Safdie was a "great" and "memorable" selection for Bowser Jr., mentioning his filmography and involvement in the Oscars.

In coverage by VG247, writers Hirun Cryer and Nadia Oxford inspected Bowser Jr. in Mario Tennis Aces, focusing on his playstyle and characterization. Cryer was highly critical, classifying him as frustrating to compete against and finding fault in his design, especially with his reliance on a mechanical assistant during matches, which he argued makes his role feel less direct. Oxford, however, took on a more positive view, referencing Bowser Jr.'s personality and his repeated desire to impress his father and noted that their interactions added charm and humor across different appearances.

=== Competitive play ===
In July 2018, Ian Walker of Kotaku reported on significant competitive backlash toward Bowser Jr. in Mario Tennis Aces, where many players considered him the most overpowered character on the roster. Within weeks of the game's release, online discussions were filled with complaints, matchup advice requests, and, in some cases, refusals to play against Bowser Jr. players in online matches. Competitive player Jonathan "Accel" Conaway stated that Bowser Jr. "essentially has every good trait in the game with nothing to offset it", arguing that the character had no clear disadvantage in neutral play. As a defensive-type character, Bowser Jr. possessed exceptional court coverage, with a reach that allowed him to return shots without diving, enabling stronger standard returns rather than weaker recovery hits. Although other character Waluigi shared the defensive classification, players widely viewed Bowser Jr. as superior due to his particular combination of attributes, including strong shot angles that could push opponents out of position, efficient super meter gain, and the ability to drift toward incoming shots while charging without sacrificing much movement speed, similar to hovering characters like Boo and Rosalina. His effective use of the "Trick Shot" mechanic further reduced risk, allowing him to recover from disadvantaged positions and quickly regain control of rallies.

Tournament data reinforced these concerns. In one online event, five of eight finalists selected Bowser Jr., and by late June 2018, he reportedly accounted for approximately 45% of the worldwide online player base. At the Community Effort Orlando tournament, while a Yoshi player won the first major offline event, much of the remaining bracket featured Bowser Jr. competitors. Third-place finisher Geoff “Geoff the Hero” Mendicino publicly remarked after a match that he had relied heavily on trick shots with the character, criticizing the game's balance. Other competitive players, including Wesley "Cat Fight" Garland, argued that Bowser Jr. was "a cut above the rest of the cast by a large margin" and suggested targeted nerfs, such as reducing his charge movement speed to limit his ability to defend both sides of the court from the baseline. In response to growing debate, tournament organizers planned a "suspect test" on July 7 to evaluate whether Bowser Jr. should face restrictions in competitive play. Although a notice in a game update indicated that further balance adjustments regarding the character were planned by game developer Camelot Software Planning. Despite widespread frustration, some competitors argued that Bowser Jr.'s dominance accelerated the metagame's development by forcing players to rapidly explore counter-strategies and character alternatives. Following this controversy, Bowser Jr. was given multiple significant nerfs that weakened his competitive viability, as reported by Emma Kent of Eurogamer.

=== Miscellaneous ===
In 2017, YouTuber "TheDominoKing", known for showcasing domino effect setups that frequently depict video game and pop culture-related material, created a setup for Bowser Jr. According to him, the setup required 5 days of effort and involved a total of more than 23 thousand dominoes. In the same year, an internet meme originated from Nintendo Switch's parental control advertising, depicting Bowser as an overprotective father, covering Bowser Jr.'s eyes whenever inappropriate content comes on-screen. Mic's Tim Mulkerin said that this inspired multiple 4chan users to utilize this meme format in unique ways.

In June 2023, GamesRadar+ journalist Jordan Gerblick reported an apparent inconsistency in the ages of Bowser and Bowser Jr. after Nintendo published an instructional video on its YouTube channel. The video, which demonstrated how to create a Nintendo account, used Bowser and Bowser Jr. as example profiles and displayed their birthdates as February 5, 1989, and March 3, 2010, respectively. Based on these dates, Bowser would be 34 years old, and Bowser Jr. would be 13 years old at the time of publication. Gerblick noted that the figures appear inconsistent with the characters' established debut appearances in the series, as Bowser first appeared in Super Mario Bros. (1985), and Bowser Jr. debuted in Super Mario Sunshine (2002). The discrepancy prompted discussion about the internal chronology of the Mario franchise. However, Gerblick suggested that the displayed dates were likely arbitrary, attributing it to Nintendo's lack of attention to such details.

In September 2025, Josh Coulson from TheGamer reported a toy leak suggesting that Bowser Jr. is in The Super Mario Galaxy Movie. Coulson mentioned that tie-in merchandise is typically made in advance of a film's release, and that an image circulating online showed an unfinished action figure of Bowser Jr. by Jakks Pacific. Although the figure lacked its detailing, the character remained identifiable. The leak gained additional attention after the image was copyrighted by NBCUniversal. Later in November, when Bowser Jr. was confirmed for The Super Mario Galaxy Movie, Coulson reported another new discussion appeared online that was related to the Marvel Comics character Prowler, especially for his theme. Critics argued that the sound effect used for Bowser Jr. in the film's promotional trailer sounded similar to that of Prowler's theme in Spider-Man: Into the Spider-Verse. The musician Daniel Pemberton, who was involved in making music for Into the Spider-Verse, also noticed the familiarity between the sounds.

== Notes ==
^{A} : First playable in Mario Kart: Double Dash, Mario Golf: Toadstool Tour, Mario Power Tennis, Mario Party: Island Tour, and Mario & Sonic at the Olympic Winter Games, respectively.
