= Koopalings =

Video game characters

- Mario characters
- Circular sequence from bottom-left to top-left: Ludwig, Wendy, Larry, Roy, Lemmy, Iggy, and Morton; artwork by Shigehisa Nakaue
- First appearance: Super Mario Bros. 3 (1988)
- Created by: Yoichi Kotabe; Takashi Tezuka
- Voiced by: See section

In-universe information
- Species: Koopa
- Affiliation: Bowser
- Weapon: Wands
- Family: Bowser (father in early games): Super Mario Bros. 3 (1988); Super Mario World (1991); Yoshi's Safari (1993)

The Koopalings, known in Japan as the Team of 7 Bowsers (Japanese: クッパ7人衆, Hepburn: Kuppa 7 Ninshū), also known as Bowser's Minions in some British English localizations, and occasionally known as the Koopa Kids in the DIC Entertainment cartoons, are a group of characters in Nintendo's Mario franchise, consisting of seven siblings: Larry Koopa, Morton Koopa Jr., Wendy O. Koopa, Iggy Koopa, Roy Koopa, Lemmy Koopa, and Ludwig von Koopa. (Note: The Japanese names and romanizations of the aforementioned characters are as follows: Japanese: ラリー, Hepburn: Rarī; Japanese: モートン, Hepburn: Mōton; Japanese: ウェンディー, Hepburn: Wendī; Japanese: イギー, Hepburn: Igī; Japanese: ロイ, Hepburn: Roi; Japanese: レミー, Hepburn: Remī; Japanese: ルドウィッグ, Hepburn: Rudowiggu) They made their debut in Super Mario Bros. 3 for the NES in 1988, in which they were presented as enemies serving under the series' primary antagonist, Bowser. The Koopalings have continued to appear in later Mario games and related media.

The group is depicted as Bowser's children in early games and in their re-releases, however, Shigeru Miyamoto stated in 2012 that they are not Bowser's children in the current story and serve as minions instead, with Bowser Jr. as Bowser's son and only child. The names of the Koopalings are attributed to well-known celebrities, primarily musicians, an aesthetic choice that was made by a former Nintendo employee, Dayvv Brooks. In terms of critics' reaction, the Koopalings have been well-received regarding their contribution to the gameplay side of the games, and for the varying personalities depicted in each character, although the critics were dissatisfied with their lack of presence in the series, their return in Super Mario Bros. Wonder – Nintendo Switch 2 Edition: Meetup in Bellabel Park was received more positively. On the other hand, researchers have examined the group's gender representation and criticized the portrayal of the female member, Wendy, for being centered on the femininity aspect and lacking appeal compared to male characters.

== Background ==
The Koopalings were described as Bowser's children in the Super Mario Bros. 3 manual.

Since their introduction in Super Mario Bros. 3, the Koopalings have been recurring antagonists in the Mario franchise. They serve as high-ranking members of Bowser's army and frequently act as bosses throughout the series. They typically appear as commanders of the Koopa Troop, stationed in different regions of the Mushroom Kingdom to oppose Mario. In their earliest appearances, the Koopalings had little individual characterization and were mainly distinguished by color schemes and minor design differences. Later games made them more unique.

The Koopalings were modeled after different members of the Super Mario Bros. 3 design team, but they initially had no names: when the game had to be localized into English, Nintendo employee Dayvv Brooks named them after various celebrities. Early Mario games and promotional material had established the Koopalings as Bowser's children, these games maintain reference to them as such in updated manuals and re-releases. However, in a 2012 interview with Game Informer magazine, series creator Shigeru Miyamoto revealed that the Koopalings are not Bowser's biological children in the current story, and they have since been described in official sources as his minions instead of his children. In their debut appearance, the Koopalings had comparatively little personality, something that would be fleshed out in future installments in the franchise.

=== Members ===
- Larry Koopa: He is the youngest member and is identifiable by his blue hair styled upward and a star-shaped marking on the side of his head. In some sources, namesakes for him have been cited to be American television host Larry King, and Irish drummer Larry Mullen Jr. However, in 2015, Dayvv Brooks contradicted these claims, stating that Larry was not named after anyone in particular and just "looked like a Larry".
- Morton Koopa Jr.: He is the largest member of the group and uses his size and strength in battle. He has darker skin and a star-shaped marking around one eye. His name pays homage to television host Morton Downey Jr., due to Downey's "loud-mouthed" personality.
- Wendy O. Koopa: The only female member of the group, she is characterized by her jewelry and pink accessories and is frequently portrayed as confident and competitive. She is also described as tomboyish, vain and temperamental. Her name is inspired by musician Wendy O. Williams.
- Iggy Koopa: He is recognized by his tall, palm tree-like green hair, glasses, and unpredictable behavior. While previously said to be the most intelligent Koopaling, later games depicted his bizarreness. His name references musician Iggy Pop. Iggy previously had rainbow-colored hair prior to his redesign in New Super Mario Bros. Wii.
- Roy Koopa: The second largest member by size after Morton, he is usually depicted with a pink head and sunglasses. He often relies on brute force in battle. Musician Roy Orbison was an influence on his name as Orbison was known for wearing dark glasses.
- Lemmy Koopa: The smallest member of the group by size, he is commonly associated with circus-like abilities, including balancing on balls during battles. He is portrayed as cross-eyed with a multi-colored mohawk haircut and has a mischievous personality. Lemmy Koopa was named after Lemmy Kilmister, with Brooks saying the name fit the character's appearance.
- Ludwig von Koopa: He is often portrayed as the eldest of the group and is identifiable by his long blue hair styled similarly to that of music composer Ludwig van Beethoven, from whom his name is derived. He is portrayed as intelligent and in games such as Mario & Luigi: Paper Jam, he claims to be the group leader.

=== Naming ===
The names of the Koopalings in the English versions of Super Mario Bros. 3 were created during the game's North American localization by translator Dayvv Brooks, who worked with Nintendo of America in the late 1980s. At the time, dedicated localization departments were not yet common, and translators often had greater freedom when adapting Japanese text for English releases. According to Brooks, the Koopalings' names were chosen as references to musicians and public figures, partly influenced by his personal interest in music. Although Brooks proposed the names during translation, they required approval from Nintendo before being finalized, and the chosen names have been used in all of the localizations of the series, including the original Japanese version.

Before selecting the names for each member of the Koopalings, in Japan, they were collectively referred to as "Kokuppa". (Note: Japanese: コクッパ, Hepburn: Kokuppa) (lit. 'Little Bowsers') The animated adaptation of Super Mario Bros. 3 utilized different names for the group because the series' creators started production before the game's western release and had to discover names on their own. The selected names were: Bully Koopa for Roy, Big Mouth Koopa for Morton, Kooky von Koopa for Ludwig, Cheatsy Koopa for Larry, Kootie Pie Koopa for Wendy, and Hip and Hop Koopa for Lemmy and Iggy.

=== Voice actors ===
The Koopalings have been portrayed by multiple voice actors across different productions, with several actors taking on roles for multiple characters over time. In the animated series of Super Mario Bros. 3 and Super Mario World, Larry, Morton, Wendy, Iggy, Roy, Lemmy, and Ludwig were respectively voiced by James Rankin, Gordon Masten, Tabitha St. Germain, Tara Strong, Dan Hennessey, Stuart Stone, and Michael Stark. In Mario is Missing!, the roles shifted, with Rob Wallace voicing Larry, Iggy, and Ludwig, Bruce Sandig voicing Roy and Lemmy, Kathy Fitzgerald voicing Wendy, and Gordon Masten not returning, leaving Morton without the same actor from the earlier series. (Note: Sources:)

From 2009 onward, voice casting became more consolidated. Lani Minella voiced Larry, Morton, Wendy, and Lemmy until 2019, while Mike Vaughn voiced Iggy and Ludwig during the same period, and Dan Falcone took on Roy, a role he has continued to voice since 2009. Beginning in 2014, newer actors were introduced alongside the existing cast, including Michelle Hippe as Larry, David Cooke as Morton, Ashley Flannegan as Wendy, Ryan Higgins as Iggy, Carlee McManus as Lemmy, and David J. Goldfarb as Ludwig, with these performers continuing in their roles in more recent appearances.

== Appearances ==
Koopalings have appeared multiple times throughout the Mario franchise, consisting of its video games and related media, since their debut in Super Mario Bros. 3. In their first appearance, the seven characters were introduced as bosses encountered at the end of each castle, serving under Bowser. They similarly returned in Super Mario World.

After these early appearances, the Koopalings were absent from the main Super Mario games for an extended period. They did not appear in later titles such as Super Mario 64, Super Mario Sunshine, and Super Mario Galaxy and its sequel, before returning in New Super Mario Bros. Wii. Subsequent games, including New Super Mario Bros. 2, New Super Mario Bros. U, and Super Mario Bros. Wonder – Nintendo Switch 2 Edition: Meetup in Bellabel Park, also featured the group as boss characters.

The characters have also appeared in various spin-off titles in the franchise, including the Mario & Luigi series, where the Koopalings are typically portrayed as individual characters with distinct designs and abilities rather than as identical boss enemies. They appear later in the story, the "Bowser's Minions" mode in Mario & Luigi: Superstar Saga + Bowser's Minions, and are featured more prominently in Mario & Luigi: Bowser's Inside Story + Bowser Jr.'s Journey as important members of Bowser Jr.'s army. All seven Koopalings were included as playable racers in Mario Kart 8 and Mario Kart 8 Deluxe. They were also featured in the Super Smash Bros. crossover fighting game series as selectable characters in the form of Bowser Jr.'s alternate skins.

Outside of video games, the Koopalings were featured in animated television adaptations, including The Adventures of Super Mario Bros. 3 and Super Mario World. In these series, they were depicted as Bowser's children, a portrayal that differs from later statements by Nintendo that the Koopalings are not his offspring. The series also used different names for the group.

== Critical reception ==
In a 2012 retrospective feature for IGN, journalist Lucas M. Thomas discussed the return of the Koopalings in New Super Mario Bros. Wii, in addition to their history. He wrote that the original Super Mario Bros. had little boss variety, as most boss encounters involved Bowser or enemies disguised as him, and that Super Mario Bros. 3 addressed this issue by introducing the Koopalings, with each member having distinct designs, personalities, and attack styles. Thomas said that the characters were popular during the NES and SNES eras but were used less often afterward, with Bowser Jr. taking their position. Thomas wrote that their reintroduction in New Super Mario Bros. Wii brought back the series' earlier use of unique bosses and served as both a nostalgic reference for longtime players and an introduction for newer audiences.

Jenni Lada of Siliconera discussed the portrayal of the Koopalings in Bowser Jr.'s Journey, noting that the characters are introduced early in the narrative and play an important role throughout the story. Lada observed that their individual personalities are shown through dialogue and interactions, with Ludwig acting in an advisory role, Morton being more straightforward, and the other Koopalings showing unique reactions to Bowser Jr.'s leadership. She believed that these exchanges helped show the group's character dynamics. According to Lada, their continued presence throughout the story enhances their status as senior members of Bowser's forces and reinforces their relationship with Bowser Jr. during events that happen alongside the main plot of Bowser's Inside Story.

Stephen Wilds of ComingSoon.net discussed the Koopalings' portrayal in the animated television series The Adventures of Super Mario Bros. 3, praising them as one of the most memorable elements of the show. Wilds wrote that the series stood out among video game adaptations for closely following the premise of Super Mario Bros. 3 while expanding the personalities of the Koopalings through their frequent appearances as recurring antagonists alongside King Koopa (Bowser). He noted that the cartoon gave each member a distinct role and characterization, with episodes often focusing on their individual schemes or smaller group efforts rather than always featuring Bowser as the sole villain, which he believed allowed for more varied stories. According to Wilds, the animated portrayal showed exaggerated personalities, sibling rivalry, and attempts to gain Bowser's approval, which he considered to be a major reason the Koopalings remained memorable to viewers. He said that the cartoon gave the characters more defined personalities than many of their early video game appearances, helping maintain their recognition within the franchise.

Toby Saunders from GameRevolution reported and brought attention to an internet trend called "#ProjectWendy". According to a discussion on Reddit, the trend originated from a private Discord group involving Super Smash Bros.-dedicated content creators demanding that Nintendo include Wendy for Super Smash Bros. Ultimate. In addition, a Twitter poll indicated Wendy's lack of popularity, with the initiative intended to increase her visibility within the community. However, Saunders affirmed that Wendy was already selectable as one of Bowser Jr.'s skins, but not with an individual move set, for which all that hassle occurred. According to the Japanese website Game*Spark, the critics were disappointed by the Koopalings' addition in Mario Kart 8, classifying them as "filler characters". Furthermore, the website noted that they were overlooked by the game's supplementary characters, such as Link and Isabelle from The Legend of Zelda and Animal Crossing franchises, respectively.

Mel Turnquist, writing for Nintendojo, compared the Koopalings with Bowser Jr., observing that his debut in Super Mario Sunshine and later appearances made fans complain about why the Koopalings are receiving so little attention. While some were fine with the Bowser Jr. inclusion, others criticized him for replacing the Koopalings. The situation further escalated when they reappeared in New Super Mario Bros. Wii. Turnquist assured that while the Koopalings were excellent characters in their own right, in contrast, Bowser Jr. was not the worst creation by Nintendo. JohnnyChugs, an author from Shacknews, investigated the connection of the Koopalings with Bowser, stating that while they are not his actual children and just minions, he cares about them equally as his own son, Bowser Jr., and provided them with facilities to succeed in their missions, in addition to giving each character their own unique castle. While there are positive aspects of their connection, there is also a negative one, particularly that the Koopalings are exposed to facing dangers and risking their lives due to Bowser's desire for revenge against his enemies.

In a 2024 Retronauts podcast, the Koopalings in relation to Bowser were discussed between three authors: Bob Mackey, Henry Gilbert, and Drew Mackie. They noted the retcon happened back in 2012 by Shigeru Miyamoto, when he confirmed that the Koopalings are no longer Bowser's children, which led the authors to question how Bowser accessed them or even connected to them, as if there was a contact involved, and criticized Miyamoto for letting the retcon happen. Conversely, the authors praised the Koopalings for adding variety from a gameplay perspective and emphasized their decade-long sudden disappearance until Mario & Luigi: Superstar Saga and, six years later, their main entry appearance. They noticed that the Koopalings did not speak that much in many of their early appearances, which affected their personalities until the later appearances. While the authors again criticized Miyamoto for not giving the Koopalings enough appeal, they praised game director Masahiro Sakurai for the inclusion of the Koopalings in the Super Smash Bros. universe as Bowser Jr.'s alternative costumes, allowing players to play as them instead of Bowser Jr.

Harry Padoan from TechRadar praised the addition of the Koopalings in Super Mario Bros. Wonder and found creativity in the manner they were depicted in their "Wonder" forms, such as Wendy resembling another Mario character, Cheep Cheep, and Morton being controlled like a puppet. Although Padoan was disappointed about their difficulty, mentioning that they were easy to defeat as bosses, he was entertained in finding ways to beat them.

=== In academic studies ===
In the 2016 study titled "A Radical Feminist Critique of the Video Game Industry" by Bryce Dumas of Worcester Polytechnic Institute, the nature of female portrayals in video games was discussed. The study mentioned the Koopalings on page 44, with Dumas noticing that the group consisted of seven siblings, with six of the characters being male, while Wendy is the only female. He implied that the male Koopalings display varied physical designs, personalities, and abilities, whereas Wendy's design primarily emphasizes traditionally feminine traits, leading some critics to argue that her characterization is less individualized in comparison. This observation has been discussed in relation to what columnist Katha Pollitt described as the "Smurfette principle", a term used to refer to the presence of a single female character within an otherwise male group. Pollitt says that this pattern can imply that male characters are treated as the default, while female characters are portrayed as exceptions or defined in relation to male counterparts. Scholars and media critics have applied this concept to video games and other forms of popular media, arguing that character design and group composition can reflect broader cultural assumptions about gender roles. This idea is also shared in the 2019 Portuguese study "O Design Gráfico como Ferramenta na Divulgação do Movimento Feminista" by Júlia Toribio Leão of the University of Porto, which, on page 61, examines how Wendy lacks personality and is less interesting compared to other male members.

Speaking of gender depiction, in another study, "Women as characters, players and developers: An educational perspective", a researcher from the University of Skövde, Emma Arltoft, has argued that the Koopalings' characterization mirrors broader patterns, especially in relation to gender. Drawing on concepts such as the "Smurfette principle" of Pollitt, she witnesses that while the Koopalings display varied personalities and visual traits, the sole female member, Wendy, is primarily defined through stereotypically feminine symbols, including pronounced eyelashes, jewelry, makeup, high heels, and a pink bow. This difference has been distinguished as indicative of a wider tendency in game design to treat male characters with flexibility, allowing them greater variation, while female characters are more narrowly constructed around gendered signals. According to Arltoft, this approach strengthens a binary understanding of gender, in which characters lacking such details are implicitly read as male, positioning Wendy's portrayal as a deviation from the norm and determining distinctions in gaming culture between what is considered standard and what is categorized as gender-specific.
