= Heroes of Hyrule =

- Developer: Retro Studios
- Publisher: Nintendo
- Platform: Nintendo DS
- Release: Cancelled
- Genre: Tactical role-playing game
- Mode: Single-player

Heroes of Hyrule was a video game concept created by developer Retro Studios in 2004. The game, which was proposed for the Nintendo DS, involved merging the exploration and puzzles solving gameplay of The Legend of Zelda with the turn based battles placed on a grid of Final Fantasy Tactics. Despite the creation of a detailed game design document, the pitch to Nintendo was immediately rejected, and the project was subsequently abandoned. The game was publicly unknown of in the following two decades, until an investigation and report on it was published by YouTube channel Did You Know Gaming? in 2022. The game's cancellation, and Nintendo's efforts to take down information related to it, were lamented by publications.

== Gameplay ==
Heroes of Hyrule was conceived as a tactical role playing video game similar to Final Fantasy Tactics while retaining the puzzle solving and exploration aspects common in The Legend of Zelda. The world would be viewed from the top-down perspective of many Zelda games, while the main player, Kori, could be moved freely around the game environment. In exploration mode, no combat could be initiated, but minigames, such as fishing, scavenger hunts, and kite flying could be played. Progress exploring the game world would be gated by barriers that could be worked around upon learning new abilities over the course of the game. When confronted with enemies, the game would turn to a turn-based battle system with grid-based movement often found in games like Final Fantasy Tactics. Puzzle-solving would play a role in battles, with attacks often having other effects in the battlefield beyond just fighting opposing characters. A traditional experience point system with a level-based progression system commonly found in the genre was omitted from the battle system in favor of a system where characters could get stronger from earning and equipping various items found in exploration or won from battles.

A major gameplay mechanic would have involved interacting with a magical book. Reading the book would allow the player to experience scenes and battles from the past, and locating new pages in exploration segments and returning them to the book would unlock new content. Altering the book could in turn alter how the book's scenes played out as well; placing a found item in the book could cause characters in the book to be stronger or have new battle abilities. Cameo characters from the Zelda franchise were planned to be able to be summoned into gameplay as well, though no specific characters were outlined.

== Plot ==
The story would have followed an original character, Kori, a child who obtained a strange magical book from an antique shop. As Kori reads the book, its events unfold all around him, featuring many staples from The Legend of Zelda fictional universe. The book documents the battle of Link and Zelda against the evil Ganon that occurred over 100 years prior. Zelda had been captured by Ganon, and Link fails in his efforts to save her, ending up captured as well. The book follows the efforts of three original heroes, one of each traditional race from the Zelda series, in their efforts to save them and stop Ganon. Dunar, a gruff fighter Goron, represented the Triforce of Power, Krel, a cyncial but kind Zora represented the Triforce of Wisdom, and Seriph, a warm-hearted Rito represented the Triforce of Courage. Approximately two-thirds of the story documents their battles, while the remaining third of the game documents the efforts of Kori in the modern age. Kori explores his surroundings to find more pages of the book that have been scattered around his world; as he finds more, he is able to learn more of the ancient battles. Concurrently, things he learns in the book help him better navigate his own world in the present. Eventually, it is learned that the book is actually the magic item that had sealed Ganon's evil power in the past, and the pages of the book had been scattered to help keep him sealed in it. With Kori finding the pages and putting them back in the book to be able to continue reading the story, he inadvertently allows for Ganon to be unsealed. The three heroes return in order to fight and defeat Ganon in the modern age. In the game's end, it would be learned that the shopkeeper from the antique shop who had sold the book to Kori was actually an elderly aged Link.

== Development and aftermath ==
In 2004, members of development team Retro Studios desired to create a game different from what they had recently been working on. The team was feeling burned out from successively making Metroid Prime (2002) and Metroid Prime 2: Echoes (2004) for the GameCube, and began brainstorming on new ideas for their next project. The team eventually came up with the idea of Heroes of Hyrule – a pitch to adapt the Legend of Zelda franchise to a tactical role-playing video game for the Nintendo DS. The team felt it was a strong proposition; it would be an opportunity to expand the franchise's gameplay styles and story lore, while using a genre that had historically performed well on Nintendo's handheld consoles. A 22-page game design document was compiled, outlining many gameplay and story points the team wished to cover, alongside some concept art. The team submitted the proposal to Nintendo SPD, who responded with an immediate rejection of the concept. No feedback was given by Nintendo, so the development team assumed that Nintendo simply had no interest in the concept, and as such, the project was cancelled before a prototype could even be started. Nintendo instead assigned the studio to develop a Metroid entry, which would become Metroid Prime 3: Corruption (2007).

The idea was not publicly known until almost 20 years later in 2022, from a video published by YouTube outlet Did You Know Gaming. Previously, concept art for a different cancelled Retro Studios project had leaked onto the internet – codenamed Project X. In digging for information on Project X, they stumbled upon the existence of Heroes of Hyrule. The publication reached out to members of Retro Studios development team, who shared much of the publicly known information on the game to them. They felt they were safe in divulging the information on the belief that the statute of limitations had run out with the information being over 15 years old. However, during the course of working on the story, the team also heard from multiple sources that Nintendo was frustrated with how many past employees were willing to speak out about the game.

The Did You Know Gaming video was published in October 2022, but promptly taken down that December due to Nintendo filing a successful copyright strike. They sharply criticized the move as a "slap in the face for video game history preservation". They also expressed surprise, as they frequently post content of abandoned or cancelled Nintendo video games and had not previously had any of their content being contested, though they conceded that it could have been different due to this one largely being their own original reporting. Nintendo never issued an official statement on the move. Some publications noted parallels between the story of Heroes of Hyrule and Breath of the Wild. Publications found the gameplay mix and use of a playable character besides Link unusual and unique, and generally lamented its cancellation, criticizing Nintendo's efforts to suppress stories related to it.
