= Andrew Jones (artist) =

American artist

- Other name: Android Jones
- Education: Ringling College of Art and Design
- Known for: Digital Art, Concept Art, Entrepreneurship

Andrew "Android" Jones is an American digital and multimedia artist whose work focuses on fantasy and psychedelic art. He is considered one of the leading figures in the visionary arts movement, alongside other artists like Alex Grey, Mark Hensen, Carey Thompson, Luke Brown, Xavi, Andrew Gonzalez and others.

== Biography ==
Jones grew up in Boulder, Colorado, and attended the Ringling College of Art and Design. After graduating he worked at Industrial Light & Magic and Interplay Entertainment, in the latter with credits on the Heart of Winter expansion pack for Icewind Dale. Jones would return to the world of video games joining Retro Studios in the development of Metroid Prime, having been a lifelong fan of the Metroid games, and would remain there for Metroid Prime 2: Echoes and Metroid Prime 3: Corruption, as well as aiding Nintendo Software Technologies in designing characters for spin-off Metroid Prime Hunters. Jones would found a company specialized in gaming concept art, Massive Black, and had credits in games such as Hellgate: London before getting disillusioned with the industry as he barely had time to play anymore and found the developer culture uncomfortable.

In 2003, he stumbled into a dome at Burning Man, El Circo, and it changed his outlook on how art influences culture. Many of the friends he made among El Circo became collaborators on a new visual creative agency called Obscura Digital. With it, Jones created digital visual art projections on landmark sites of human progress like the Sydney Opera House in Australia, the Empire State Building in New York City, and for the Ghats in Varanasi in India.

In 2016, he was invited to a party called SynerGenesis where he met former psychedelic artists, who later became heroes and mentors to him. For Jones it was “the big bang” of the visionary arts movement. Colleagues tended to judge and demonize the exploration of psychedelics, but in the visionary arts community Jones was celebrated, so he leaned into the opportunity in order to build a life for himself.

His artwork has been featured on album covers of several electronic, psybient and rock music artists such as STS9, Bassnectar, Bluetech, Beats Antique, Sporeganic, Phutureprimitive, and Tipper. He supported the Grateful Dead’s Fare Thee Well Tour in 2015.

In 2018, Jones was invited to represent the Burning Man Project at the Renwick Gallery of the Smithsonian American Art Museum in Washington DC for an exhibition called ‘No Spectators: The Art of Burning Man’. The project invited artists, builders and creators of varied mediums and expertise who assemble annually in Black Rock City to create the annual event.

Jones spends his days making art on his farm in Lyons, Colorado with his wife Martha and their three children.

== Publications ==
- Wade, Daniel; Bouvier, Nicolas; Jones, Andrew (2006). D'artiste Concept Art: Digital Artists Masterclass. Adelaide, South Australia: Ballistic Publishing. ISBN 1921002336.
