= Dark Trooper =

Dark Trooper may refer to:

- Dark Trooper, an enemy in the video game Star Wars: Dark Forces
- Dark Trooper, an Imperial droid in the Star Wars streaming television series The Mandalorian
- Dark Trooper, an enemy in the video game Metroid Prime 2: Echoes
