= Sky Temple =

Sky Temple may refer to:

- Temple of Heaven in Beijing, China
- Sky Temple, a map in the video game Heroes of the Storm
- Sky Temple, the final area in the video game Metroid Prime 2: Echoes
- A disproven rumoured secret dungeon that could allegedly be found in The Legend of Zelda: Ocarina of Time
- Sky Haven Temple, a location in the video game The Elder Scrolls V: Skyrim
- Palace in the Sky (whose original Japanese name 天空の神殿 transliterates as "Temple of the Sky"), the final level in the video game Kid Icarus
