= List of Wii games on Wii U eShop =

This is a list of Wii games that were available on Wii U for download from the Nintendo eShop.

These games utilize the backward compatibility of Wii U with Wii games in order to run, albeit without needing to explicitly access the Wii Menu. Games that can be played with the Classic Controller can also be played using the Wii U GamePad as a controller instead. The download variants can also support any save files created on or transferred to the Wii U from any respective disc variant of the same title.

Although similar to Virtual Console games in some ways, they are usually treated as a distinct concept by Nintendo. However, they were referred to as Virtual Console titles on the Nintendo of America website. Unlike most Virtual Console games, they run on native hardware rather than emulation.

A total of 35 games were released—of which 33 games were released in Japan, 30 in North America, and 28 in PAL regions.

As of the Wii U eShop's closure on March 27, 2023, these games are no longer available for purchase digitally, although they are available for redownload if previously bought.

== Games ==
The following list is sorted by title by default. To sort by other columns, click the corresponding icon in the header row.

Title	Publisher	Developer(s)	Japan	North America	PAL	Ref.
Donkey Kong Country Returns Donkey Kong Returns^{JP}	Nintendo	Retro Studios	January 21, 2015	September 22, 2016 (Note: This title was originally available as a My Nintendo reward in North America from March 31, 2016 until June 30, 2016. The game was eventually publicly released via the Nintendo eShop on September 22, 2016.)	January 22, 2015	
Excitebots: Trick Racing Excite Mō Machine^{JP}	Nintendo	Monster Games	June 28, 2017	December 15, 2016	Unreleased	
Kiki Trick	Nintendo	Nintendo SPD	June 28, 2017	Unreleased	Unreleased	
Kirby's Epic Yarn Keito no Kirby^{JP}	Nintendo	Good-Feel	August 9, 2016	July 28, 2016	May 21, 2015	
Kirby's Return to Dream Land Kirby's Adventure Wii^{PAL} Hoshi no Kirby Wii^{JP}	Nintendo	HAL Laboratory	January 28, 2015	July 30, 2015	February 19, 2015	
Lost in Shadow A Shadow's Tale^{PAL} Kage no Tō^{JP}	Konami	Hudson Soft	June 28, 2017	October 27, 2016	July 21, 2016	
Mario Sports Mix	Nintendo	Square Enix	August 24, 2016	August 11, 2016	October 8, 2015	
Mario Strikers Charged Mario Strikers Charged Football^{PAL}	Nintendo	Next Level Games	August 17, 2016	September 8, 2016	May 12, 2016	
Mario Super Sluggers Super Mario Stadium Family Baseball^{JP}	Nintendo	Bandai Namco Games	August 17, 2016	March 31, 2016	Unreleased	
Metroid: Other M	Nintendo	Team Ninja	March 17, 2016	December 8, 2016	March 31, 2016	
Metroid Prime: Trilogy	Nintendo	Retro Studios	Unreleased	January 29, 2015	January 29, 2015	
Muramasa: The Demon Blade Oboro Muramasa^{JP}	Marvelous	Vanillaware	August 19, 2015	Unreleased	Unreleased	
New Play Control! Donkey Kong Jungle Beat Wii de Asobu: Donkey Kong Jungle Beat^{JP}	Nintendo	Nintendo EAD	June 21, 2017	November 3, 2016	December 1, 2016	
New Play Control! Pikmin Wii de Asobu: Pikmin^{JP}	Nintendo	Nintendo EAD	June 21, 2017	September 29, 2016	September 1, 2016	
New Play Control! Pikmin 2 Wii de Asobu: Pikmin 2^{JP}	Nintendo	Nintendo EAD	June 21, 2017	March 30, 2017	December 15, 2016	
New Super Mario Bros. Wii	Nintendo	Nintendo EAD	August 9, 2016	Unreleased	January 7, 2016	
Pandora's Tower Pandora no Tō: Kimi no Moto e Kaeru Made^{JP}	Nintendo	Ganbarion	March 4, 2015	August 13, 2015	April 16, 2015	
PokéPark Wii: Pikachu's Adventure PokéPark Wii: Pikachu no Daibōken^{JP}	Nintendo	Creatures Inc.	July 5, 2017	May 19, 2016	July 16, 2015	
Project Zero 2: Wii Edition Zero: Shinku no Chou^{JP}	Nintendo	Tecmo Koei	August 3, 2016	Unreleased	October 20, 2016	
Punch-Out	Nintendo	Next Level Games	June 24, 2015	January 22, 2015	March 12, 2015	
Rayman Raving Rabbids	Ubisoft	Ubisoft Montpellier	Unreleased	July 6, 2017	July 6, 2017	
Resident Evil 4: Wii Edition Biohazard 4: Wii Edition^{JP}	Capcom	Capcom	July 5, 2017	February 4, 2016	October 29, 2015	
Resident Evil: The Umbrella Chronicles Biohazard: Umbrella Chronicles^{JP}	Capcom	Capcom	July 5, 2017	November 10, 2016	Unreleased	
Rhythm Heaven Fever Beat the Beat: Rhythm Paradise^{PAL} Minna no Rhythm Tengoku^{JP}	Nintendo	Nintendo	July 27, 2016	November 10, 2016	November 24, 2016	
Sin & Punishment: Star Successor Sin and Punishment: Successor of the Skies^{PAL} Tsumi to Batsu (Sin and Punishment): Sora no Kōkeisha^{JP}	Nintendo	Treasure	March 25, 2015	August 27, 2015	April 30, 2015	
Super Mario Galaxy	Nintendo	Nintendo EAD Tokyo	May 31, 2015	December 24, 2015	February 4, 2016	
Super Mario Galaxy 2	Nintendo	Nintendo EAD Tokyo	January 15, 2015	January 14, 2015	January 14, 2015	
Super Paper Mario	Nintendo	Intelligent Systems	August 3, 2016	June 16, 2016	August 11, 2016	
The Legend of Zelda: Skyward Sword Zelda no Densetsu: Skyward Sword^{JP}	Nintendo	Nintendo EAD	September 2, 2016	September 1, 2016	September 1, 2016	
Trauma Team Hospital. 6-nin no Ishi^{JP}	Atlus	Atlus	August 19, 2015	December 3, 2015	Unreleased	
Wario Land: Shake It! Wario Land: The Shake Dimension^{PAL} Wario Land Shake^{JP}	Nintendo	Good-Feel	August 24, 2016	November 17, 2016	April 7, 2016	
WarioWare: Smooth Moves Odoru Made in Wario^{JP}	Nintendo	Intelligent Systems	June 21, 2017	September 15, 2016	October 6, 2016	
Xenoblade Chronicles Xenoblade^{JP}	Nintendo	Monolith Soft	July 27, 2016	April 28, 2016	August 5, 2015	
Zack & Wiki: Quest for Barbaros' Treasure Takarajima Z: Barbaros no Hihō^{JP}	Capcom	Capcom	June 28, 2017	January 21, 2016	December 3, 2015	
Zangeki no Reginleiv	Nintendo	Sandlot	February 18, 2015	Unreleased	Unreleased	

== See also ==
- List of Wii U games
- List of Wii games
- Lists of Virtual Console games
