= GamesTM =

British video games magazine

gamesTM
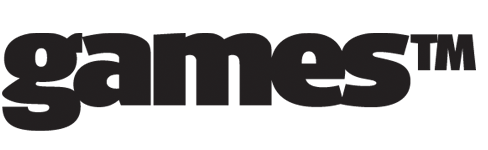

- Cover of the final issue (206), featuring Rage 2
- Editor: Jon Gordon
- Staff writers: Josh West
- Categories: Computer and video games
- Frequency: Monthly
- Circulation: 20,013 (9 Jan – 9 Dec 2010); 21,677 (8 Jan – 8 Dec 2009); 22,284 (7 Jan – 7 Dec 2008); 20,376 (6 Jan – 6 Dec 2007)
- Publisher: Highbury Entertainment (2002–2006); Imagine Publishing (2006–2016); Future Publishing (2016–2018)
- First issue: December 2002
- Final issue Number: November 2018; 206
- Company: Future Publishing
- Country: United Kingdom
- Based in: Richmond House; 33 Richmond Hill; Bournemouth
- Language: English (defunct); Dutch (defunct); German (defunct)
- ISSN: 1478-5889

GamesTM (styled as games^{TM}) was a British multi-format video games magazine. The first issue was released in December 2002 and the magazine was still being published monthly in English and German up until the last edition was published on 1 November 2018.

== Format ==
Besides covering all current and recent happenings in the video game world, the magazine included a retro section at the rear, with reviews of past games and "battles" between older consoles.

As a standard, it was around 112 pages long. News articles, developer interviews and the like were located at the front, with the preview section following. After the previews there was usually a large feature focused on a particular game or games company. This feature normally covered 4 to 5 pages. The section for readers' letters followed, at the end of the magazine.

Since it was a multi-format magazine, a large number of games on all formats were reviewed. However, the majority of released games were not reviewed because of space and deadline restrictions.

== Reviews ==
Reviewed games were given an overall score marked out of 10. While several games have received 9/10, only sixteen games in the magazine's history achieved the ultimate score of 10:

- Metroid Prime
- Burnout 3
- Gears of War
- God of War II
- BioShock
- Grand Theft Auto IV
- Fallout 3
- Demon's Souls
- Mass Effect 2
- Super Mario Galaxy 2
- LittleBigPlanet 2
- Dead Space 2
- BioShock Infinite
- Grand Theft Auto V
- Metal Gear Solid V: The Phantom Pain
- Super Mario Odyssey

In addition, the online modes of Project Gotham Racing 2, Halo 3, LittleBigPlanet, Monster Hunter Tri and Halo: Reach all scored a 10, although the single-player of each title only received an 8 or 9.

The magazine had also started to review game related hardware on occasion as well as aspects of Xbox Live. These typically included games available for purchase on the Xbox Live Marketplace and various retail games with Live functionality.

== History ==
In January 2006, the future of the magazine became uncertain after its publisher, Highbury Entertainment, went into administration with debts of GBP £27 million. No subscribers received issue #40 and the next issue (#41) did not appear in the shops, though it should have been out on 26 January 2006. At that time, the magazine's staff could not be contacted and calls to the subscription helpline led to an automated message that said all magazine copies had been sold. The magazine's website went offline but was available again a few days later.

On 20 January 2006, Imagine Publishing announced that it had acquired GamesTM along with 23 other Highbury titles.

Imagine Publishing has since announced that it will continue to publish GamesTM, resuming with issue #41 which was published in February 2006.

Issue #42 was released on 23 March 2006, with an explanation from its new editor in the introduction, stating that the magazine will undergo an evolution. The magazine resumed publishing according to its usual monthly schedule after that.

In Issue #62, the "evolution" of the magazine proposed back in Issue #42 finally occurred, when it received its first major overhaul since its inception. Although the content of the magazine was largely unchanged, it received a complete visual makeover as well as the addition of two new regular segments: "Illustrated" pages that highlighted influential games from the past, and "Reader's View", which gave readers the chance to have their own articles featured in the pages of the magazine.

In 2006, GamesTM celebrated its 50th issue.

From 3 March 2008 to 2 December 2009, a German version of GamesTM was released on a (bi)monthly schedule in Germany, Austria and Switzerland.

On 1 April 2008, the Dutch version of GamesTM was first released in the Netherlands and Belgium, with a scheduled 11 issues per year.

As of issue #68, GamesTM introduced "Industry", a recruitment-focused mini magazine built into the magazine that allows game developers, universities and colleges to advertise their job positions and related courses amongst industry focused news editorial and features.

In September 2010, GamesTM celebrated its 100th issue by releasing 100 different covers - limited to 400 prints of each - representing one of the magazine's 100 greatest games of all time.

GamesTM was acquired by Future Publishing alongside the entire Imagine Publishing portfolio in 2016. The last issue was published in November 2018, with Future explaining that the magazine was "no longer profitable".
