= New Play Control! =

Series of GameCube games ported to the Wii

- New Play Control! titles in Japan
- Publisher: Nintendo
- Platform: Wii

New Play Control! (Note: Japanese: Ｗｉｉであそぶセレクション, Hepburn: Wii de Asobu Selection) is a series of first-party GameCube games ported to the Wii by Nintendo. Games in the New Play Control! series feature enhancements such as widescreen support, enhanced graphics and the implementation of the Wii's motion controls with the Wii Remote and Nunchuk.

== Background ==
Nintendo initially announced the Wii de Asobu Selection range of games for Japan in a presentation on October 2, 2008, confirming Pikmin and Donkey Kong Jungle Beat would launch later in the year, whilst a spokesperson for Nintendo of Europe confirmed days later that the series would also launch in Europe. In Japan, Pikmin and Donkey Kong Jungle Beat launched in December 2008 and were followed throughout 2009 by Mario Tennis GC, Pikmin 2, Chibi-Robo! and Metroid Prime 2: Dark Echoes. In the same year, New Play Control! launched in Europe, North America and Australia, though not all games were made available worldwide: Pikmin 2 did not launch in North America until June 2012, when it was released as a Nintendo Selects game instead of a New Play Control! game; Chibi-Robo! was never released outside Japan.

Despite being based on GameCube games, New Play Control! games do not use the Wii's backward compatibility to support GameCube controllers.

=== Changes ===
Pikmin and Pikmin 2 allow players to point and click with the Wii Remote to whistle and throw Pikmin. Mario Power Tennis draws on the swinging motions seen in Wii Sports to perform various swings, while it is also possible to move the character with the control stick if the Nunchuk is attached. Metroid Prime and Metroid Prime 2: Echoes use the same control functions, which are first featured in Metroid Prime 3: Corruption. An early prototype of the control scheme had already been used with a technical demo version of Metroid Prime 2, first seen when the Wii Remote was initially announced.

Other changes have been made to the games other than the updated controls and improved graphics. Donkey Kong Jungle Beat features new levels and modified level design for existing levels to give the game a more traditional platforming feel. Pikmin allows players to roll back their game saves to previous days, erasing only a recent part of the save file, though this did not carry over to Pikmin 2. Metroid Prime and Metroid Prime 2: Echoes feature some of the additions introduced in Metroid Prime 3: Corruption, including the achievements system, unlockable content and the ability to take screenshots.

== Release ==
Four of the games, Donkey Kong Jungle Beat, Mario Power Tennis, Pikmin and Pikmin 2, have been universally released as New Play Control! games, though Pikmin 2 did not carry the moniker for its North American release as it was released three years after the rest of the series. The two Metroid Prime games were bundled with Metroid Prime 3: Corruption and released in the limited edition Metroid Prime: Trilogy compilation, which launched in 2009 and was given only one limited edition print run, being discontinued soon after release. Pikmin 2 was not released in North America until June 2012, when it and Mario Power Tennis were released as budget games in the Nintendo Selects range; these versions of the games do not feature reversible cover art or the New Play Control! moniker, instead being marketed as classic Nintendo GameCube games with enhanced Wii controls.

Each game in the New Play Control! series features a standard cover art, explaining the premise of the series, as well as each game's original Nintendo GameCube cover art. Each game's cover art is reversible; reversing the cover shows the original version of the cover art with no New Play Control! branding, except on the game's logo.

Following the introduction of Wii games on Nintendo eShop on Wii U in January 2015, several of the games have been released on the platform without the New Play Control! branding. Metroid Prime: Trilogy was the first to launch in Europe and North America, where it became available in January 2015; it was later followed in 2016 by Donkey Kong Jungle Beat, Pikmin, and Pikmin 2.

== Games ==
Game	Japan	Europe	North America	Australia
Chibi-Robo!	June 11, 2009	Unreleased		
Donkey Kong Jungle Beat	December 11, 2008	June 5, 2009	May 4, 2009	June 18, 2009
Mario Power Tennis (Note: Also released as a Nintendo Selects title in Europe and North America.)	January 15, 2009	March 6, 2009	March 9, 2009	March 26, 2009
Metroid Prime (Note: Outside Japan, these games were only sold as part of Metroid Prime: Trilogy.)	February 19, 2009	September 4, 2009	August 24, 2009	October 15, 2009
Metroid Prime 2: Echoes	June 11, 2009	September 4, 2009	August 24, 2009	October 15, 2009
Pikmin	December 25, 2008	February 6, 2009	March 9, 2009	February 26, 2009
Pikmin 2 (Note: Released only as a Nintendo Selects title in North America.)	March 12, 2009	April 24, 2009	June 10, 2012	May 14, 2009

== See also ==
- Touch! Generations
- High-definition remasters for PlayStation consoles
- List of Nintendo Switch 2 Edition games
