= Super Mario Galaxy 2 =

2010 video game

- Developer: Nintendo EAD Tokyo (Note: Nintendo Software Technology developed the Nintendo Switch version.)
- Publisher: Nintendo
- Director: Koichi Hayashida
- Producers: Yoshiaki Koizumi; Takashi Tezuka
- Designer: Kenta Motokura
- Programmer: Takeshi Hayakawa
- Artist: Kenta Motokura
- Composers: Mahito Yokota; Ryō Nagamatsu; Koji Kondo
- Series: Super Mario
- Platforms: Wii; Nintendo Switch
- Release: Wii: NA: May 23, 2010; JP: May 27, 2010; EU: June 11, 2010; AU: July 1, 2010; Nintendo Switch: WW: October 2, 2025
- Genres: Platform, action-adventure
- Modes: Single-player, multiplayer

Super Mario Galaxy 2 (Note: Japanese: スーパーマリオギャラクシー2, Hepburn: Sūpā Mario Gyarakushī Tsū) is a 2010 platform game developed and published by Nintendo for the Wii. It was first announced at E3 2009 and is the sequel to 2007's Super Mario Galaxy. Much like the first game, the story follows Mario as he pursues the Koopa King, Bowser, into outer space, where he has imprisoned Princess Peach and taken control of the universe using Power Stars and Grand Stars. Mario must travel across various galaxies to recover the Power Stars in order to travel to the center of the universe and rescue Princess Peach.

The game was originally planned as an updated version of Super Mario Galaxy, known as Super Mario Galaxy More. However, it was later decided that the game would be expanded into a fully fleshed-out sequel when the development staff continued to build upon the game with dozens of new ideas. As such, development time expanded to two and a half years. The sequel features dynamic environments, new power-ups and Yoshi.

Super Mario Galaxy 2 was met with critical acclaim, and was considered to match or surpass its lauded predecessor, with its creativity, level design, gameplay, music, and technological improvements over the original receiving high praise, although critics were divided on its lack of story and high difficulty compared to the original. It is frequently regarded by critics to be one of the greatest video games ever made and is one of the best-selling games on the Wii, with over seven million copies sold worldwide.

An enhanced collection, alongside Super Mario Galaxy, was released for the Nintendo Switch on October 2, 2025. Both games were also released separately on the Nintendo eShop. The enhanced release features 1080p resolution, improved UI, and additional content such as an assist mode and a new storybook. A free update at the game's launch allowed for the Nintendo Switch 2 to play in 4K resolution, and allows the 2nd player using the game's "Co-Star" mode to play using the Joy-Con 2's mouse control feature. Additionally, another update released in April 2026 added an epilogue chapter to the storybook on both consoles. A feature film featuring elements from both games, titled The Super Mario Galaxy Movie, released in April 2026. It is the sequel to The Super Mario Bros. Movie (2023), with its release being a part of the franchise's 40th anniversary celebrations.

== Gameplay ==
The gameplay of Super Mario Galaxy 2 is near-identical to its predecessor's, with a focus on platforming based on and around 3D planets, grouped into levels known as galaxies. Planets and galaxies each have varying themes, sizes, landscapes, and climates. The player controls Mario (or later in the game, his brother Luigi, though using him is optional), who has special abilities such as the "Spin" attack, long jump, wall jumps, and a variety of somersaults. As in the original, the objective of the game is to travel to the various galaxies and collect Power Stars, which are awarded by completing levels and accomplishing tasks and are used to gain access to later levels. The game retains various gameplay mechanics introduced in the original, such as the blue Star Pointer that allows the player to collect Star Bits and shoot them at enemies, levels that restrict movement to a 2D plane, balance ball levels and gravity-reversing background arrows.

=== Setting and level design ===
The game provides the player access to the game's galaxies through means of a map system similar to that in previous Mario games such as Super Mario World and New Super Mario Bros. Wii. This is navigated via a mobile planet called Starship Mario that serves as a hub world, which can be visited anytime and is expanded when new abilities or levels are unlocked. The game contains forty-nine galaxies allotted among seven different regions in the universe (called "worlds"), with the general difficulty progressively increasing in each world. The first six worlds end with a boss level, in which the objective is to defeat Bowser or Bowser Jr. (the former being in even-numbered worlds, and the latter being in odd-numbered worlds), which then allows the player to access the next world. When the player collects all 120 Power Stars, 120 Green Star missions are unlocked. These levels, containing Green Stars that are hidden or placed in hard-to-reach areas, require intense exploration and precision and may cause instant death if the player fails. Super Mario Galaxy 2 contains 242 unique Power Stars to collect overall.

Most of the levels in Super Mario Galaxy 2 offer a unique task based around its theme, and many focus on dynamic environments that change or alternate between various states. For example, some environments change to the beat of the background music, such as sudden shifts in the direction of gravity or the appearance or disappearance of platforms; others feature a special switch that temporarily slows down time. Prankster Comets, which were featured in the original game and cause variation and tougher challenges in levels, no longer appear randomly in visited galaxies but instead require the collection of a Comet Medal in that galaxy in order for it to appear. In addition, Prankster Comets have become more general and offer any number of variations: while Super Mario Galaxy offered only five mutually exclusive variations, the Prankster Comets in Super Mario Galaxy 2 range to any number of challenges that often mix or overlap. These include defeating all the enemies, collecting 100 Purple Coins, completing the level within a time limit, completing the level with only one maximum health unit or avoiding Cosmic Clones (doppelgängers of Mario that imitate the player's actions). As a result, both the dynamic environments and the Prankster Comets often create challenges with puzzle elements, requiring precision and strategy in order to overcome them.

=== Power-ups ===
Cloud Mario is one of the new power-ups in the game. Mario is using the power-up, creating temporary platforms in midair to get to out-of-reach places.

All the original transformations in Super Mario Galaxy return, with the exception of Ice Mario and Flying Mario. Three new power-ups and items for Mario are introduced in the game. These include the Spin Drill, which allows the player to burrow through planets and emerge out the other side; Rock Mario, which allows the player to transform into a rolling boulder and smash through enemies and other obstacles; and Cloud Mario, which allows the player to create up to three temporary platforms in midair.

Mario is able to ride the dinosaur Yoshi in certain levels. When riding Yoshi, the player's blue Star Pointer is replaced by a red dot, which allows the player to point at various objects and manipulate them with Yoshi's tongue. Yoshi can use his tongue to swing across gaps, pull levers and swallow berries and enemies (with the option to spit the latter back out as projectiles). Yoshi also allows the player to flutter jump, allowing the player to leap further than normal. There are also three different power-up fruits available for Yoshi to eat that grant him temporary abilities. These are the Dash Pepper, the Blimp Fruit and the Bulb Berry. The Dash Pepper makes Yoshi run at an extremely high speed, allowing him to run up walls and on water; the Blimp Fruit allows Yoshi to float in the air for a limited amount of time; the Bulb Berry allows Yoshi to reveal secret pathways. If the player takes damage while riding Yoshi, the player will fall off and Yoshi will run away until the player gets back on him. If the player does not get back on quickly enough, Yoshi will retreat into his egg and to different nests which can only be found in certain areas of the level.

=== Guides and multiplayer ===
The Cosmic Guide appears if the player has failed during a particular level a certain number of times, and allows the player to give computer control over Mario to complete the level. The drawback is that the player is awarded a Bronze Star, which is not added to the overall Power Star count, requiring the player to complete the level without using the Cosmic Guide to earn a golden Power Star. There are also monitors called "Hint TVs" that demonstrate how to perform a specific move or optimal ways of using a power-up.

Multiplayer gameplay has also been expanded upon over the original. In Super Mario Galaxy, another player could use a second Wii Remote to control a second Star Pointer and assist Mario by grabbing enemies or collecting and shooting Star Bits. In Super Mario Galaxy 2, the second player controls an orange Luma who retains all the original abilities, but can also physically attack enemies and collect items, power-ups and 1-ups, making the player's involvement more useful.

== Plot ==
In a retelling of the first game's story, Princess Peach invites Mario to share a cake at the Star Festival, a centennial celebration that occurs when Star Bits rain down from the skies over the Mushroom Kingdom. On his way to Peach's castle, Mario finds a lost Baby Luma, who immediately befriends him and grants him the ability to spin. Shortly thereafter, Mario's nemesis Bowser, who has grown to an immense size after abusing the power of the Grand Stars, attacks the castle. Kidnapping Peach, Bowser escapes into outer space to recreate his empire at the center of the universe. After finding two Lumas who offer their help to Mario, one of them transforms into a Launch Star that launches Mario into outer space. After landing on and venturing through the first galaxy and obtaining his first Power Star, Mario arrives on a small planetoid functioning as a spaceship and meets Lubba, a large purple Luma who leads a small band of Lumas. Lubba explains that Power Stars are needed to power the spaceship and that the spaceship's crew were attacked by Bowser earlier, with some Lumas having been thrown overboard. Lubba has realized that Bowser kidnapped Peach and offers help in tracking him down and saving the princess. Lubba offers to grant Mario temporary ownership of the spaceship in exchange for him bringing back more Power Stars. After Mario agrees, Lubba instructs the Lumas to rebuild the ship in honor of Mario and they do so, rebuilding it in the shape of his head. Mario is then thusly given control of Starship Mario. Starship Mario then sets off on its journey towards the center of the universe to save Peach. As Mario travels the cosmos, explores more galaxies, and obtains more Power Stars, he meets new species and joins up with his companion Yoshi, the Toad Brigade from the original Super Mario Galaxy, and his brother Luigi, all whom join Mario on the starship.

As Mario and his allies travel the universe, he encounters Bowser's son Bowser Jr., who is once again aiding his father in his plan and hinders Mario's progress by fighting him twice, losing both times. Mario also encounters Bowser twice in his own galaxies, also managing to defeat him in battle both times, although he escapes after each defeat. All the while, Mario collects Grand Stars, which are enhanced forms of Power Stars that create portals allowing access to another part of the universe. After traveling through various galaxies throughout the universe collecting Power and Grand Stars, Mario and his allies finally reach Bowser's giant starship generator, which is draining energy from what appears to be a comet. Mario infiltrates the starship and engages Bowser in a third battle. Once again, Mario defeats Bowser and causes him to revert to his normal size and fall to his presumed death. Just as he falls, the last Grand Star appears. Before Mario can grab it, Bowser emerges, having survived the fall. He consumes the Grand Star, once again increasing his size and making him more powerful. A final battle ensues, in which Mario manages to finally defeat Bowser by ground-pounding meteorites onto him, causing him to once again shrink and fall into the abyss. Mario grabs the last Grand Star and saves Peach. They return to Starship Mario and Rosalina and her Comet Observatory from the first game appear before Starship Mario. Rosalina thanks Mario for watching over Baby Luma, who then returns to the Comet Observatory, taking Mario's hat with him to remember. Mario and his friends return to the Mushroom Kingdom and celebrate their victory, whereas Bowser is revealed to once again have survived. However, he is enraged at having been shrunken down to a comically small size. The game ends with Starship Mario flying above Peach's castle, with the Comet Observatory streaking across the sky.

== Development ==
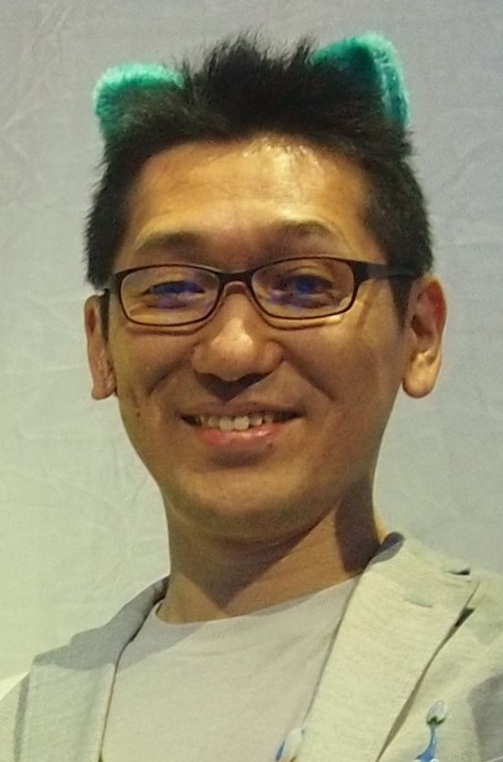
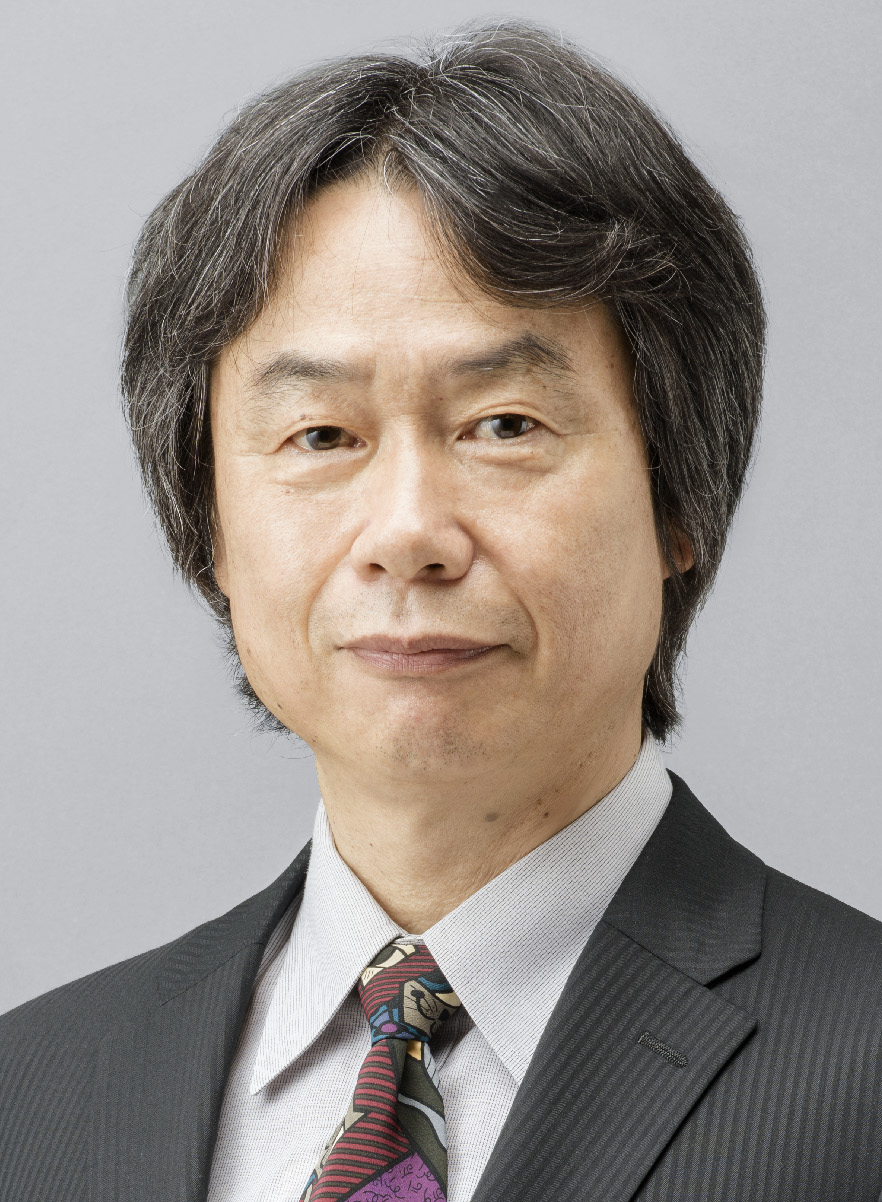
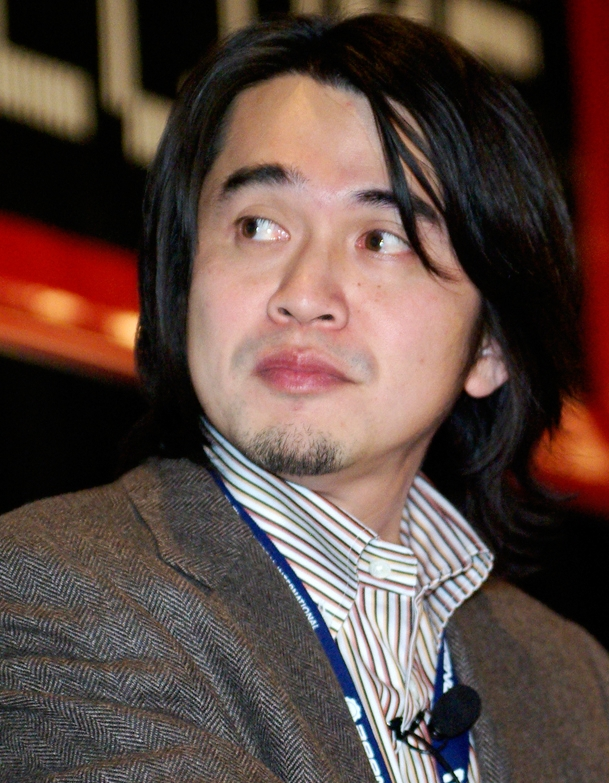
The director, general producer, and co-producer in 2013, 2015, and 2007, respectively: Koichi Hayashida, Shigeru Miyamoto, and Yoshiaki Koizumi.

After Nintendo completed Super Mario Galaxy, Shigeru Miyamoto approached the development team and suggested that a follow-up be produced. The game was originally planned to just do variations on the original game's planets and call the game "Super Mario Galaxy More", and was dubbed "Super Mario Galaxy 1.5" during early development, with a projected development time of approximately a year. The first elements that were implemented were anything that was scrapped from the original game, either to ensure game balance or simply because of time constraints, such as Yoshi and the concept of a planet shaped like Mario's head. Over time, more and more new elements and ideas were brought into the game, and it was decided that the game would be a fleshed-out sequel rather than a slightly modified follow-up. Thus, development took two and a half years. Koichi Hayashida and Takeshi Hayakawa served as the director and lead programmer, respectively. Hayakawa created a development tool that allowed different staff members, including visual and sound designers, to easily design and create stages without waiting for programmers, many of which were incorporated into the final game.

In order to help distinguish Super Mario Galaxy 2 from its predecessor, the staff originally wanted the whole game to revolve around the concept of "switching", in which the game's environments would dramatically change under certain conditions. This concept ended up being particularly difficult to implement full-scale and was relegated to only certain levels. Another idea that came up early on were cameo inclusions by other Nintendo characters (specifically Donkey Kong and Pikmin). The idea was nixed by Miyamoto, who stated that Pikmin characters would not work within the Mario universe, and that there was no reason for other such cameos. Game tutorials were confined to an optional system called the "Tip Network" to benefit players already familiar with the original game. Miyamoto compared Super Mario Galaxy 2 to The Legend of Zelda: Majora's Mask, in that both games use the same engines as their predecessors, yet build upon their foundations.

The game was revealed at E3 2009 on June 2. In Miyamoto's private conference, it was stated that the game was very far along in development, but its release was held back to mid-2010 because of New Super Mario Bros. Wii's release in late 2009. Miyamoto also stated that the game has 95–99% new features, with the rest being previous features introduced in Super Mario Galaxy. With regard to the original game, Nintendo of America President and CEO Reggie Fils-Aimé stated in an interview that the sequel would be more challenging, and Miyamoto said in a Wired interview that the game would have less focus on plot. Miyamoto initially hinted that the game might utilize the "Super Guide" feature, introduced in New Super Mario Bros. Wii, and this was confirmed by Nintendo's Senior Manager of Product Managing, Bill Trinen, who claimed that the feature was implemented differently compared to what New Super Mario Bros. Wii offered. The feature is called Cosmic Guide, where the Cosmic Spirit (Rosalina) takes control of Mario.

The game made its playable debut at the Nintendo Media Summit 2010 on February 24, 2010, when a second trailer for the game was released, and its North American release date on May 23, 2010, was finally announced. The Japanese, European and Australian versions of the game came packaged with an instructional DVD manual, explaining the basic controls, as well as showing advanced play. The voice actors from Super Mario Galaxy reprise their roles for its sequel including Scott Burns (who voiced Bowser in previous games) and Dex Manley (who played Lubba and Lakitu).

In January 2015, late Nintendo president Satoru Iwata announced at a Nintendo Direct presentation that Super Mario Galaxy 2, alongside other Wii games such as Punch-Out!! and Metroid Prime: Trilogy, would be re-released for download on the Wii U's Nintendo eShop. It was released on January 14, 2015.

=== Music ===
Super Mario Galaxy 2: Original Soundtrack

Soundtrack album by Mahito Yokota, Ryo Nagamatsu, and Koji Kondo
- Released: July 10, 2010
- Genre: Video game soundtrack
- Length: 65:00 (Disc 1); 66:39 (Disc 2)
- Label: Club Nintendo

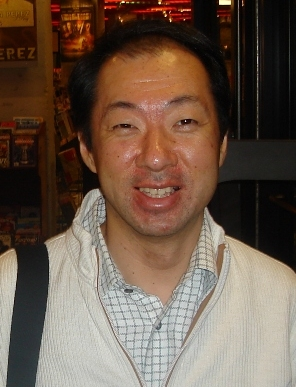
Kondo in 2006

As with the original Super Mario Galaxy, Super Mario Galaxy 2 features a musical score written for and performed by a symphony orchestra (known as the Mario Galaxy Orchestra in the credits). Early in the development process, when the concept of "Super Mario Galaxy 1.5" was being considered, there were no plans to use different music from the first Super Mario Galaxy. However, as the game evolved, the sound team, headed by Mahito Yokota, realized they needed new music that fit with the new gameplay mechanics that were being added. Although they were hesitant to use a symphony orchestra again because of recording difficulties, general producer Shigeru Miyamoto gave permission immediately – according to Yokota, Miyamoto felt that players would be expecting an orchestral soundtrack. Miyamoto also apparently suggested that players would want to hear arrangements from Super Mario Galaxy, which is why the soundtrack is a mixture of brand new pieces and arrangements of themes from the original Galaxy as well as many past installments in the Mario series, such as Super Mario World and Super Mario 64. Ryo Nagamatsu, who worked previously on Mario Kart Wii, Wii Sports Resort, and New Super Mario Bros. Wii, contributed nine pieces to the soundtrack.

Koji Kondo recruited sixty musicians for the orchestra, ten more than the number of musicians used for the original game's score, with an additional ten musicians providing a big band style of music with trumpets, trombones, saxophones and drums for a total of seventy players. The orchestral performances were conducted by Taizo Takemoto, renowned for his work with the Super Smash Bros. Concert in 2002, while Kondo served as a supervisor, while also contributing five pieces to the soundtrack. The soundtrack was available as a 2-disc set to Japanese Club Nintendo members with seventy songs taken from the game.

== Reception ==
=== Critical reception ===
Reception

Aggregate scores
Aggregator	Score
GameRankings	97%
Metacritic	98/100
OpenCritic	94% recommend (Note: Based on 79 reviews)

Review scores
Publication	Score
1Up.com	A
Destructoid	10/10
Edge	10/10
Eurogamer	10/10
Famitsu	10/10, 9/10, 9/10, 9/10
Game Informer	9.25/10
GamePro	4.5/5
GameSpot	10/10
GameSpy	4.5/5
GameTrailers	9.7/10
Giant Bomb	5/5
IGN	10/10
Nintendo Life	10/10
Nintendo World Report	9.5/10
Official Nintendo Magazine	97%
X-Play	5/5

Awards
Publication	Award
Nintendo Power	Game of the Year 2010
GamesMaster	Game of the Year 2010
Official Nintendo Magazine	Game of the Year 2010
Games Magazine	Game of the Year 2010

Like its predecessor, Super Mario Galaxy 2 was widely acclaimed by major video game critics with numerous reviews praising the game for its creativity and technical improvements over the original. Most reviewers agreed that the game either lived up to or surpassed the original Super Mario Galaxy. It has an average critic score of 97% at GameRankings and 98/100 at Metacritic, making it one of the highest-rated games on the sites alongside its predecessor.

Tom McShea from GameSpot called it a "new standard for platformers", giving it a perfect 10, making it the seventh game in the site's history to earn that score. Other perfect scores came from Edge, stating "This isn't a game that redefines the genre: this is one that rolls it up and locks it away," and IGN's Craig Harris, who felt that the game "perfectly captures that classic videogame charm, the reason why most of us got into gaming from the start". IGN later placed Super Mario Galaxy 2 fourth on their "Top Modern Games" list and listed it as the greatest Wii game of all time. The Escapist editor Susan Arendt echoed this view by stating it "doesn't tinker with the established formula very much, but we didn't really want it to", while GameTrailers commented that "there's something tremendous for just about everyone and games that we can truly recommend to almost everyone are rare". Ryan Scott at GameSpy regards it a much better game than the first Super Mario Galaxy, stating, "For a series that's explored every conceivable angle of its genre, the Mario games keep coming up with ways to challenge our notions of what a platformer can and should do."

Giant Bomb's Ryan Davis particularly praised the improved level designs, commenting that the designers were "bolder" and "more willing to take some weird risks with the planetoids and abstract platforming that set the tone in the original Galaxy", while Chris Kohler from Wired commented that the level concepts alone "could be made into full games on their own". Additionally, 1UP.com's Justin Haywald noted the expanded soundtrack as "sweeping". X-Play editor Andrew Pfister awarded Super Mario Galaxy 2 a 5/5, calling it "the culmination of 20 years of Mario gaming into one fantastically-designed and creative platformer".

Despite this praise, some critics raised complaints over increased difficulty and the game's similarity to the original Super Mario Galaxy. Chris Scullion from Official Nintendo Magazine called it the "new best game on Wii", but said it lacked the original's impact (though they admitted the extreme difficulty of this, due to the quality of the original). Game Informer editor Matt Helgeson was concerned with some of the challenges being potentially "frustrating", particularly towards the end of the game; similarly, Ben PerLee from GamePro remarked that the "increased difficulty and high proficiency requirement may turn new fans off". However, Worthplaying editor Chris DeAngelus praised the game's difficulty, stating that "there are very few sequences where death will feel like a result of bad design instead of player error, which helps keep the frustration down". McShea opined that the game is "much more streamlined than its predecessor" and therefore "the best thing that can be said about the story is that it mostly stays in the background". Kohler acknowledged that the reduced focus on story "was done with the intent of keeping things laser-focused on the gameplay" but mentioned that "Galaxy showed that the Mario team has some genuinely solid storytelling ability, and they implemented it in a way that didn't distract from the gameplay" and that "in this case it feels like a waste of talent."

=== Sales ===
In Japan, Super Mario Galaxy 2 sold 143,000 copies on its first day of release and 340,000 copies in its first week, about 90,000 more than the first Super Mario Galaxy sold in the same amount of time. In North America, the game sold 650,000 copies during the month of May 2010. In the United Kingdom, Super Mario Galaxy 2 was the third best-selling game among multiplatform releases and the best-selling single platform release for the week ending June 26, 2010. As of July 16, 2010, the game has sold 1 million copies within the USA. As of April 2011, Super Mario Galaxy 2 has sold 6.36 million copies worldwide.

=== Awards ===
Super Mario Galaxy 2 received Game of the Year 2010 awards from Nintendo Power, GamesMaster, Official Nintendo Magazine, Edge, GamesTM, Destructoid and Metacritic. It was named best "Wii Game of the Year" by IGN, GameTrailers, GameSpot, 1UP.com, and many other media outlets. In December 2010, IGN awarded Super Mario Galaxy 2 the number 1 Wii game, overtaking its predecessor. In the March 2012 issue of Official Nintendo Magazine, the publication named Super Mario Galaxy 2 the 'Greatest Nintendo Game Ever Made', ranking at #1 out of 100. The game was nominated for Best Wii Game at the Spike TV Video Game Awards 2010. It was also nominated for "Favorite Video Game" at the 2011 Kids' Choice Awards, but lost to Just Dance 2. During the 14th Annual Interactive Achievement Awards, the Academy of Interactive Arts & Sciences nominated Super Mario Galaxy 2 for "Outstanding Achievement in Gameplay Engineering".
