= Metroid Prime: Trilogy =

2009 video game compilation

- North American and PAL region box art
- Developer: Retro Studios
- Publisher: Nintendo
- Series: Metroid
- Platform: Wii
- Release: NA: August 24, 2009; EU: September 4, 2009; AU: October 15, 2009
- Genre: Action-adventure
- Modes: Single-player, multiplayer

Metroid Prime: Trilogy is a 2009 action-adventure game compilation developed by Retro Studios and published by Nintendo for the Wii. It compiles three entries from the Metroid franchise: Metroid Prime (2002), Metroid Prime 2: Echoes (2004) and Metroid Prime 3: Corruption (2007).

Prime and Echoes, originally developed for the GameCube, were updated with features first implemented in Corruption, such as a control scheme based on the Wii Remote and Nunchuk and a credits system supported by the WiiConnect24 internet service.

Metroid Prime: Trilogy was released in North America in August 2009, followed by Europe and Australia in September and October. It was not released in Japan, where ports of Prime and Echoes were released separately as part of the New Play Control! series. In January 2010, Nintendo discontinued Trilogy in North America and Australia.

Metroid Prime: Trilogy was acclaimed, with praise for the new controls, updated presentation, credits system, and value for money. It was rereleased on the Wii U's Nintendo eShop in January 2015.

== Content ==
The ported version of Metroid Prime 2: Echoes has a different aspect ratio, changed from 4:3 to 16:9 widescreen, and allows for the targeting reticle to be aimed anywhere on the screen using the Wii Remote.

Metroid Prime: Trilogy is a video game compilation which includes Metroid Prime, Metroid Prime 2: Echoes and Metroid Prime 3: Corruption. The first two games were originally released for the GameCube and did not feature motion controls. The updated Wii versions of Prime and Echoes, which were released separately in Japan as part of the New Play Control! series, use the same Wii Remote control scheme introduced in Corruption. The Spring Ball ability featured in Corruption is also implemented in the first two games. Other changes include faster load times, updated textures, bloom lighting, and 16:9 widescreen support, but the heads-up display is always shown at the original aspect ratio, causing it to be stretched horizontally when in widescreen mode.

The credits system from Corruption was incorporated into the first two games. Players can earn credits by accomplishing certain tasks, allowing them to unlock in-game items such as artwork, music, a screenshot feature, decorative items for Samus' gunship in Corruption, and the Fusion Suit in Prime, in which the latter was previously unlocked by connecting the Game Boy Advance game Metroid Fusion. Credits could also be shared with registered Wii friends, who also have a copy of Trilogy, via WiiConnect24 which used the Wii's own 16-digit number as opposed to a separate Friend Code. The save data for the original release of Corruption cannot be carried over to its Trilogy version. The compilation also features the multiplayer mode from Echoes, which is limited to four-player local multiplayer and does not feature online play. In response to complaints from players and critics about Echoes's high difficulty during some of the boss battles, the difficulty of those encounters was lowered. The games are accessible through a new, unified main menu, which also allows independent access to the Echoes multiplayer mode, the extras menu, and other settings.

== Development ==
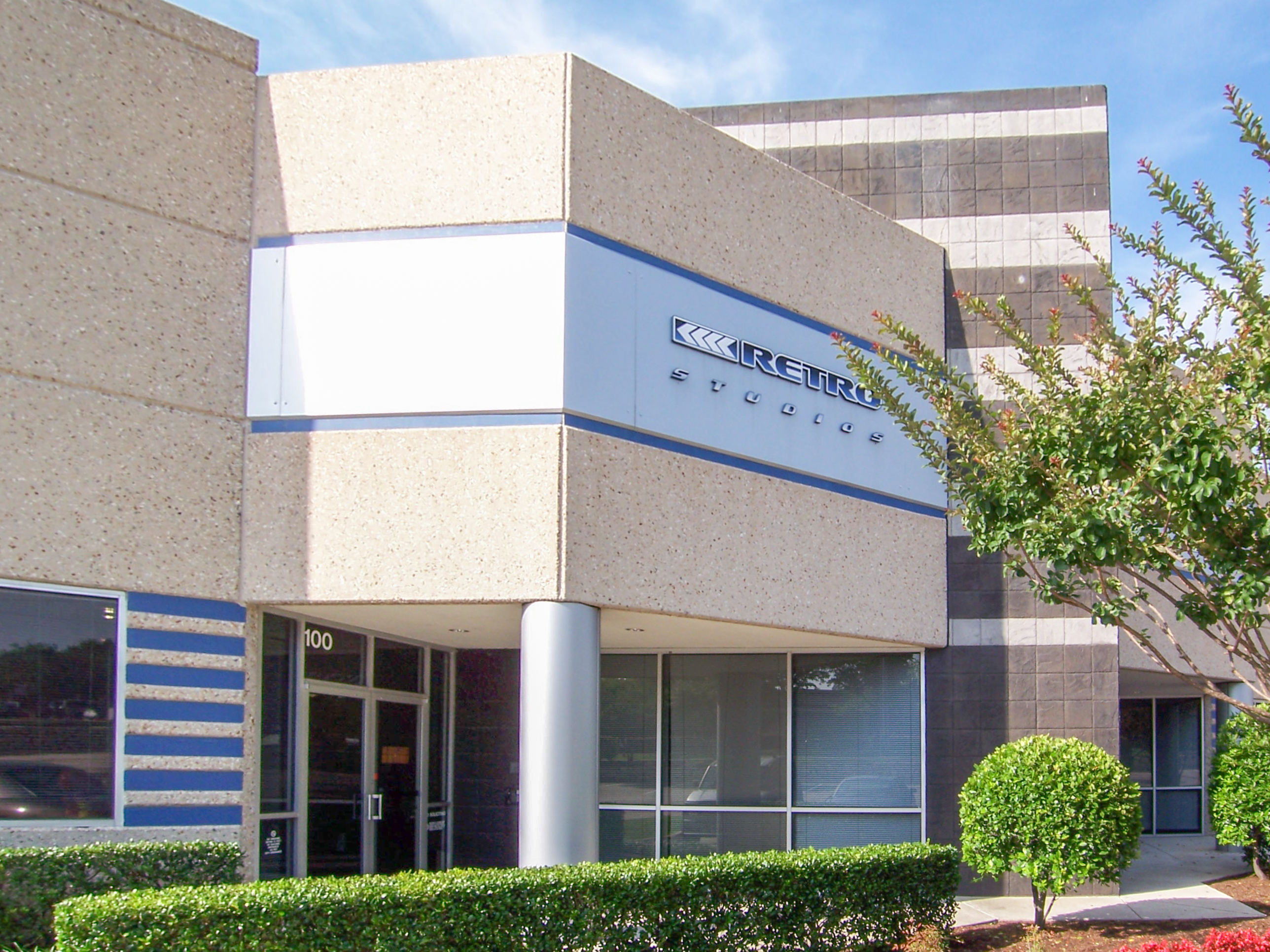
Retro Studios, based in Austin, Texas, developed Metroid Prime: Trilogy with only a few members of the staff.

In 2004, while Retro Studios was finishing work on Metroid Prime 2: Echoes, senior producer Bryan Walker suggested Retro "do something for the fans by putting all the games together on a single disc in a collector[']s 'trilogy' edition". The studio president, Michael Kelbaugh, sent the proposal to Nintendo, who agreed. Development began shortly before the launch of Metroid Prime 3: Corruption, with a team of four, as most of the crew were busy with Donkey Kong Country Returns. Prime series producer Kensuke Tanabe asked the staff to resolve most of the glitches for the Trilogy release to prevent sequence breaking.

Walker considered the compilation "an almost unheard of opportunity to take something you had already released and make it better". Senior designer Mike Wikan said most of the additions were subtle, such as higher-resolution textures and streamlining the engines for steady framerates and shorter loading times. The team added bloom lighting to Prime, adjusted the difficulty of Echoes to make it more accessible to new players, and optimized Corruption to run more efficiently. The particle and water ripple effects in Prime were reduced, and the word "damn", uttered by the character Admiral Dane in Corruption, was replaced with "no".

== Release ==
In October 2008, Nintendo presented the New Play Control! series of GameCube ports, with Prime and Echoes among the initial games in Japan. For international version, Metroid Prime: Trilogy was released in North America on August 24, 2009, packaged in a steelbook case, along with an art booklet. The European release in the following month maintained the booklet, while the Australian release in October only had a metallic cardboard slip cover. In January 2010, Nintendo of America was no longer producing or shipping copies of the game and recommended to players to find second hand copies of Trilogy via video game stores. Nintendo Australia also discontinued the game at the same time. Following Nintendo of America and Nintendo Australia's announcement, Nintendo of Europe assured that the game was not discontinued in their region.

In April 2011, a copy of Trilogy—signed by Retro Studios staff and Tanabe—was auctioned, with 100 percent of proceeds to be donated to the relief efforts for the Tōhoku earthquake and tsunami. In August 2013, the retailer GameStop acquired a significant stock of pre-owned copies of Metroid Prime: Trilogy, alongside Xenoblade Chronicles, without shrinkwrap. The Trilogy was available for purchase from their website as a "vintage" game for US$84.99, a higher price based on a market value driven by supply and demand. In 2015, Metroid Prime Trilogy was rereleased alongside Super Mario Galaxy 2 on the Wii U's Nintendo eShop in North America and Europe on January 29, 2015, and in Australia and New Zealand one day later.

Metroid Prime: Trilogy uses a dual-layer disc to allow all three games to fit on a single disc. Nintendo of America stated that some Wii consoles may have difficulty reading the high-density software due to a contaminated laser lens. At one point, Nintendo offered a free repair for owners who experienced this problem.

== Reception ==
Reception

Aggregate scores
Aggregator	Score
GameRankings	92.35% (34 reviews)
Metacritic	91/100 (48 reviews)

Review scores
Publication	Score
1Up.com	B+
Edge	8/10
Eurogamer	9/10
Game Informer	9/10
GamePro	5/5
GameSpy	4.5/5
GamesRadar+	9/10
IGN	9.5/10
Official Nintendo Magazine	94%
NGamer	9.1/10

Metroid Prime: Trilogy received acclaim. GameSpy's Phil Theobald praised it as a compilation of three great games for the price of one. Matt Casamassina of IGN cited the "fantastic gameplay" and "brilliant presentation values", while Martin Kitts of NGamer UK praised the achievements system and value for money. Eurogamer's Kristan Reed thought the new implementations made it attractive to new and returning players, and that "not since Super Mario All Stars in the SNES era has Nintendo taken an opportunity to unite one of its great series in such an irresistible way". 1UP.com's Jeremy Parish liked the new control scheme, stating that "the smooth precision of the Wii Remote makes the older games well worth revisiting". Joystiq was also positive about the new controls, but found they made the first two games easier and recommended choosing a higher difficulty setting.

GamePro's Ashley Schoeller said the games were graphically dated and complained that the HUD was "out of aspect" to fit the widescreen. Official Nintendo Magazine's Fred Dutton said that some aspects of Prime and Echoes had aged, saying the backtracking "feels like more of a chore than it did seven years ago" and that it is "not until [Echoes] enters its final third that things really start to pick up". GamesRadar considered the achievements too expensive, and that the similarity between the three games gives "an inescapable sense of déjà vu". Edge noted that the control scheme was not innovative, and that Echoes and Corruption "favoured graphical flourishes over design innovation". While Ben Reeves of Game Informer praised the compilation, the "second opinion" reviewer, Adam Biessener, considered it "subpar", saying it lacked innovation, and that the Wii control scheme, particularly aiming and panning, was inferior to the traditional scheme from the GameCube games. Ludwig Kietzmann of Joystiq said the main menu felt "like a bad DVD menu", and lamented the loss of the original menus from Prime and Prime 2 with their soundtracks and graphic design. Joystiq's editor in chief Chris Grant was also disappointed in the loss of some animations for the ice beam, which were removed due to technical constraints associated with Samus' now freely moveable arm.

In IGN's Top 25 Wii Games list, Metroid Prime: Trilogy ranked third (2011), and fourth (2012). In a feature article regarding games collections, Bob Mackey of 1UP.com listed Trilogy as the "Hardest-to-find Work of Greatness", noting that it "had a conspicuously low print run; finding a copy in the wild proves difficult, and eBay prices often reach 100 dollars".
