= Retro Studios =

American video game developer

Retro Studios, Inc.
- Type: Subsidiary
- Industry: Video games
- Founded: September 21, 1998; 28 years ago
- Founder: Jeff Spangenberg
- Headquarters: Austin, Texas, U.S.
- Key people: Michael Kelbaugh (president and CEO)
- Products: Metroid Prime series; Donkey Kong series
- Parent: Nintendo (2002–present)
- Website: retrostudios.com

Retro Studios, Inc. is an American video game developer and subsidiary of Nintendo based in Austin, Texas. The studio is best known for its work on the Metroid Prime and Donkey Kong series and has contributed to several other Nintendo-developed projects, such as Mario Kart 7.

Retro was founded on September 21, 1998, as an alliance between Nintendo and Iguana Entertainment founder Jeff Spangenberg, hoping to create games for the upcoming GameCube aiming at an older demographic. The company began work on four games, all of which were canceled once Retro focused its resources on Metroid Prime, the first Metroid game developed outside Japan. The success of Metroid Prime led Retro to work on three sequels and later to become involved with reviving the Donkey Kong series with Donkey Kong Country Returns.

== History ==
=== 1998–2002: Founding and Metroid Prime ===
Retro Studios was founded on September 21, 1998, as an alliance between Nintendo and industry veteran Jeff Spangenberg. Spangenberg subsequently launched the company from his home on October 1, using funds he generated with his previous ventures, including Iguana Entertainment. Nintendo saw an opportunity for the new studio to create games for the upcoming GameCube targeting an older demographic, in the same vein as Iguana Entertainment's successful Turok series for the Nintendo 64. Retro began with 4 key people in late 1998 and opened an office in Austin, Texas in early 1999 with a staff of 25 people, including several former Iguana employees. Despite not having access to GameCube development kits, the studio immediately began work on four projects for the GameCube: an action adventure game named MetaForce, a vehicular combat game with the working title Car Combat (also known as Thunder Rally), an American football simulator named NFL Retro Football, and role-playing game Raven Blade. By the time development began, the studio had already grown in size to 120 employees. The company continued to grow during production, eventually peaking at over 200 employees.

The working environment was chaotic, with development getting behind schedule, and Nintendo executives complaining on how the games turned out. In 2000, producer Shigeru Miyamoto visited the studio. He was disappointed by the games except for its demonstration of the MetaForce game engine, which led Miyamoto to suggest that Retro could use the engine to develop a new game in the Metroid series. Shortly before the 2000 Nintendo Space World conference, Nintendo granted Retro the license to create Metroid Prime, and Retro shifted all development resources from MetaForce to the new game.

Retro eventually canceled development of their other projects to focus solely on Metroid Prime. In February 2001, the company ended development of both NFL Retro Football and Thunder Rally, laying off about 20 employees. Although Retro demonstrated Raven Blade at E3 in 2001, the development team was plagued by technical setbacks. In July 2001, Retro canceled the project, retaining only nine team members to work on Metroid Prime. Notably, artist Android Jones served as lead concept artist on the development of Metroid Prime.

On May 2, 2002, Nintendo secured $1 million worth of Retro Studios stock from Spangenberg, and reclassified the company as a first party developer and division of Nintendo. Steve Barcia, the founder of Simtex, replaced Spangenberg as president of the company.

During the final nine months of Metroid Prime's development, Retro's staff worked 80- to 100-hour weeks to reach their final milestone. Despite its troubled production cycle and initial skepticism from fans, the game was released on November 17, 2002, in North America to universal critical acclaim and commercial success, selling over two million units worldwide.

=== 2003–2009: The Metroid Prime trilogy ===
After the critical and commercial success of Metroid Prime, Nintendo asked Retro Studios to produce a sequel. The developers decided against recycling the features of the first game while creating Metroid Prime 2: Echoes, and instead used new sound models, weapon effects, and art designs. A multiplayer component was also added to the game. In April 2003, Steve Barcia left the company. Michael Kelbaugh, who had worked with Nintendo for over 15 years, was appointed president, a job he retains to this date. Retro tried to include some extras, such as a hidden version of Super Metroid, but were halted by the short development time. Producer Kensuke Tanabe later revealed in an interview that the game was just about thirty percent complete three months before the strict deadline Nintendo had set for a release in the 2004 holiday season. The critical reception for Metroid Prime 2: Echoes was very positive, but earned some criticism on the game's high difficulty. Sales for Echoes were lower than the first Prime, with a total of 800,000 units.

Retro Studios was then put to produce the next game in the Metroid Prime series, Metroid Prime 3: Corruption. Retro intended to give Metroid Prime 3: Corruption larger environments than Echoes. The developers were also interested in using the WiiConnect24 feature to provide additional content for the game that would be accessible from the Internet. Retro announced that Corruption would be the final chapter of the Prime series and would have a plot "about closure, told against the backdrop of an epic struggle". After the Wii Remote was revealed, Nintendo demonstrated how Metroid Prime 3 would take advantage of the controller's special abilities with a version of Echoes modified for the Wii and shown at the Tokyo Game Show in 2005. Originally envisioned as a launch game for the Wii in November 2006, Corruption suffered many delays, but eventually being released in August 2007 with generally positive reviews, and over 1.60 million copies sold worldwide.

While Retro was busy with the Prime sequels, it had to pass on the Nintendo DS game Metroid Prime Hunters. The eventual developer, Nintendo Software Technology (NST), worked closely with Retro to design the game's art and characters to make sure that they fit into the overall Metroid series.

=== 2010–present: Donkey Kong Country series, Metroid Prime 4: Beyond, and other projects ===
In April 2008, Retro saw the departure of three key developers, designer Mark Pacini, art director Todd Keller, and principal technology engineer Jack Mathews, who went on to form their own company, Armature Studio. Around the same time, Shigeru Miyamoto asked fellow producer Kensuke Tanabe to recommend a studio that could develop a new Donkey Kong game, and Tanabe recommended Retro. Kelbaugh had worked on the Donkey Kong Country series during his years at Nintendo of America, and had interest in continuing with the franchise. Retro accepted the task, and thus started development of Donkey Kong Country Returns. Similar to New Super Mario Bros., the game was developed with the intention to invoke nostalgic feelings in the player with its art style and sound, while trying to provide them with new gameplay experiences. Returns employs fully polygonal 3D graphics with three times the amount of textures and polygons that Corruption offered, and over the course of six months, two thirds of the game's tools and engine had to be rewritten by the programmers. Development accelerated at the outset of 2010, and the project was just "beginning to cohere as a game" around the time of E3, when it was officially announced to the press. Although the game was set for release in autumn that year, the team still had 70 levels to create or refine.

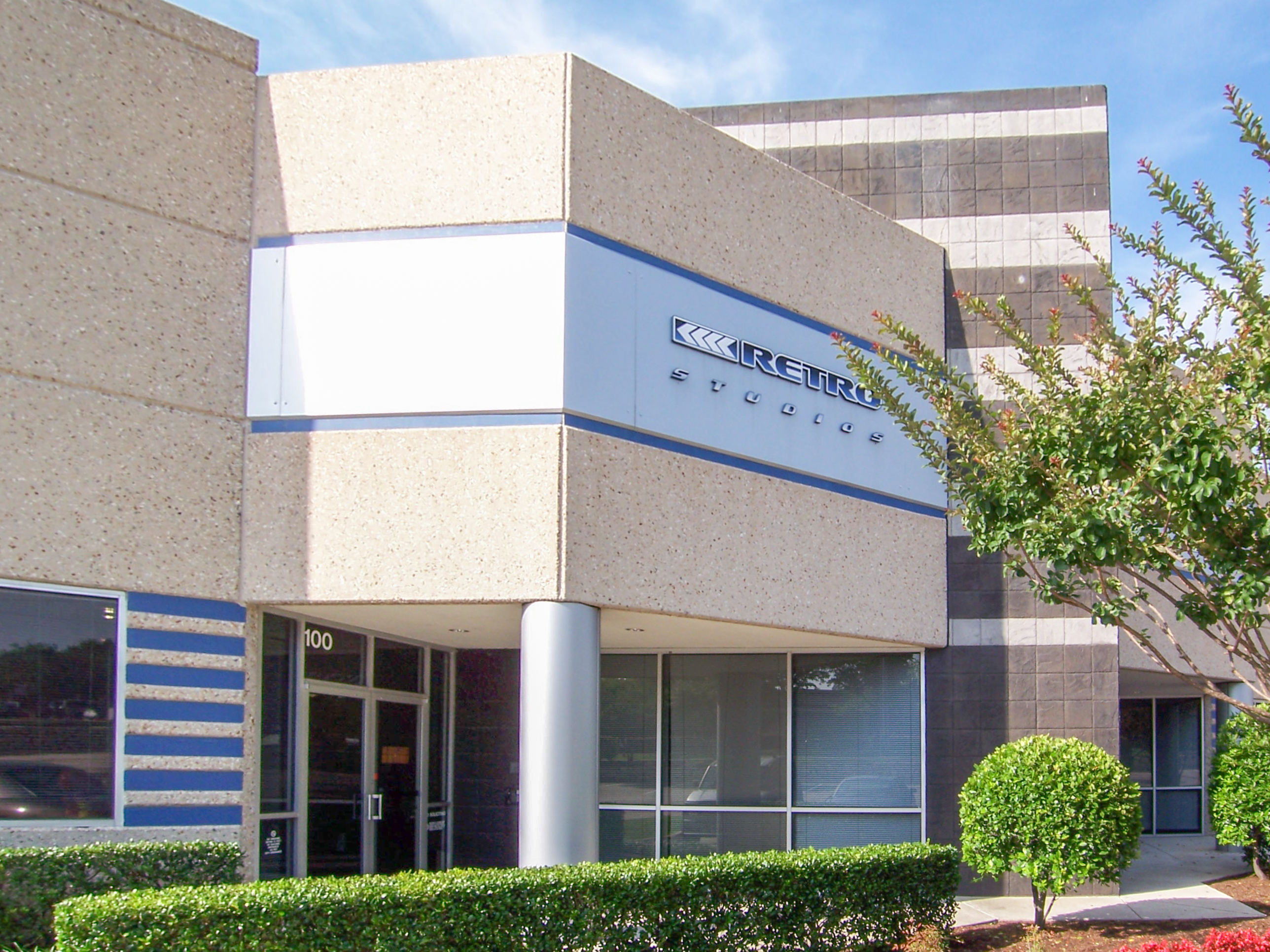
Retro Studios' former headquarters in Austin, Texas. The company moved to a new location in 2011.

At E3 2011, it was announced during Nintendo's Developer Roundtable that Retro Studios would be involved in the development of Mario Kart 7 for Nintendo 3DS. At first, Retro would contribute assets to developing one of the Donkey Kong-themed levels, but the number evolved to the stage design of sixteen tracks in the late stages of development, as the Nintendo EAD crew started working on other projects and the game would not be finished before the December 2011 deadline.

In 2012, it was revealed that Retro Studios had received a Wii U development kit, and was reportedly working on a Wii U game. Miyamoto has said he would like to work with Retro Studios in an installment for The Legend of Zelda; however, he says that the current game Retro Studios was working on is not related to Zelda. At E3 2012, Nintendo of America president Reggie Fils-Aimé told IGN in an interview that Retro is currently "hard at work" on an untitled project for the Wii U.

On February 28, 2014, Kensuke Tanabe announced that Retro Studios was working on a new game, which CEO Michael Kelbaugh declared had been in development for a few months since Donkey Kong Country: Tropical Freeze was finished. In August 2015 however, during an interview about Metroid Prime: Federation Force, Tanabe said that he was not quite sure about what Retro Studios was working on, leaving the impression that he was no longer involved with its unannounced project. Retro released an enhanced port of Tropical Freeze for the Nintendo Switch in 2018.

Nintendo announced Metroid Prime 4 at E3 2017, showing only the logo. Shortly after the announcement, Bill Trinen, Director of Product Marketing at Nintendo of America, confirmed that Prime 4 would not be developed by Retro Studios, the studio that developed the previous Metroid Prime games, but would be produced by Kensuke Tanabe, the producer of the previous games. In 2018, Eurogamer reported that Prime 4 was being developed by Bandai Namco Studios in Singapore. However, in a video released on January 25, 2019, Nintendo EPD general manager Shinya Takahashi announced that Metroid Prime 4 had been delayed, and that development had been restarted with Retro Studios. Takahashi said that development under the previous studio had not met Nintendo's standards. Nintendo's shares fell by 2.8 percent in the week following the announcement. By this time, only half the development team that worked on Metroid Prime 3 was still at the company.

During this time, Retro made some key hires to fill out the team. It brought on Halo character modeller Kyle Hefley in October 2019. In January 2020, Stephen Dupree, lead designer of Donkey Kong Country: Tropical Freeze, returned to the company after two years away. In February 2020, EA DICE art director Jhony Ljungstedt joined Retro.

On February 8, 2023, Nintendo announced and released Metroid Prime Remastered, an HD update to the 2002 original from Retro Studios. It was later revealed that Retro had wanted to produce new cinematics for the game, but Nintendo chose to keep the originals. Metroid Prime 4: Beyond was finally released in December 2025.

== Games ==
Year	Title	Genre(s)	Platform(s)
2002	Metroid Prime	Action-adventure	GameCube
2004	Metroid Prime 2: Echoes	Action-adventure	GameCube
2006	Metroid Prime Hunters (Note: Character designs only; game developed by Nintendo Software Technology)	Action-adventure	Nintendo DS
2007	Metroid Prime 3: Corruption	Action-adventure	Wii
2009	Metroid Prime: Trilogy	Action-adventure	Wii
2010	Donkey Kong Country Returns	Platform	Wii
2011	Mario Kart 7 (Note: Co-developed with Nintendo EAD)	Racing	Nintendo 3DS
2014	Donkey Kong Country: Tropical Freeze (Note: Co-developed with Monster Games)	Platform	Wii U
2018	Donkey Kong Country: Tropical Freeze	Platform	Nintendo Switch
2023	Metroid Prime Remastered	Action-adventure	Nintendo Switch
2025	Metroid Prime 4: Beyond	Action-adventure	Nintendo Switch
2025	Metroid Prime 4: Beyond	Action-adventure	Nintendo Switch, Nintendo Switch 2

=== Canceled ===
Title	Genre(s)	Platform(s)	Details
MetaForce	Action-adventure	GameCube	The game mostly consisted of concept artwork, design documents, and a mock up engine for a third-person game that was reworked into a first-person game due to pressure from Nintendo and Retro executives. This game was eventually cancelled, but apparently inspired Shigeru Miyamoto to hand Retro the Metroid license, thereby moving the development team to produce Metroid Prime instead.
NFL Retro Football	Sports	GameCube	The game designers initially wanted to make a Mario Football game, but Nintendo settled on a realistic simulator with the NFL license due to Retro's purpose of creating mature games. The game was canceled in February 2001. A possible cause was Electronic Arts and Sega agreeing to port the Madden NFL and NFL 2K series to the GameCube.
Car Combat / Thunder Rally (working titles)	Vehicular combat	GameCube	It was initially pitched to Nintendo as a mix of "QuakeWorld, Twisted Metal 2, and Mario Kart 64 with shades of Mad Max and Street Fighter II". Despite being the project with most progress at Retro, it was canceled along with NFL Retro Football in February 2001. Two members of the development team, programmer David "Zoid" Kirsch and modeler Rick Kohler, joined the Metroid Prime project.
Raven Blade	Role-playing	GameCube	The game was showcased at E3 2001, but production was plagued with technical setbacks, and the game eventually got canceled in July 2001 so Retro could focus on Metroid Prime. Nine members of its development team joined Prime.
Heroes of Hyrule	Tactical role-playing	Nintendo DS	A rejected pitch for a Legend of Zelda title starring a Goron, a Zora, and a Rito who set out to rescue Link.
Untitled The Legend of Zelda title	Action	Wii	A Legend of Zelda title starring a Sheikah in a story that explores the origins of the Master Sword.
Star Fox Armada	Shoot 'em up	Wii U	A rejected pitch for a Star Fox title featuring a puppet visual style and online multiplayer.
Harmony	Role-playing	Nintendo Switch	An original role-playing title with singing mechanics. The game was cancelled in favor of development on Metroid Prime 4: Beyond, restarting previous development of the game.
