= Metroid Prime 2: Echoes =

2004 video game

- North American and PAL region box art
- Developer: Retro Studios
- Publisher: Nintendo
- Director: Mark Pacini
- Producers: Bryan Walker; Kenji Miki; Kensuke Tanabe
- Programmer: Frank Lafuente
- Artist: Todd Keller
- Composer: Kenji Yamamoto
- Series: Metroid
- Platforms: GameCube; Wii
- Release: November 15, 2004: GameCube; NA: November 15, 2004; EU: November 26, 2004; AU: December 2, 2004; JP: May 26, 2005 Wii; JP: June 11, 2009
- Genre: Action-adventure
- Modes: Single-player, multiplayer

Metroid Prime 2: Echoes is a 2004 action-adventure game developed by Retro Studios and published by Nintendo for the GameCube. It is the sixth main Metroid game, and was released in North America, Europe and Australia in late 2004. In Japan, it was released in May 2005 as Metroid Prime 2: Dark Echoes. (Note: Metroid Prime 2: Dark Echoes (メトロイドプライム2: ダークエコーズ))

The story follows the bounty hunter Samus Aran after she is sent to rescue Galactic Federation Marines from a ship near Aether, a planet inhabited by a race known as the Luminoth. She discovers that the troops were slaughtered by the Ing, a hostile race that came from an alternate dimension of Aether. Samus must travel to four temples to ensure the destruction of the evil Ing, while battling them, wild creatures, Space Pirates, and her mysterious doppelgänger, Dark Samus.

Retro sought to differentiate Echoes with a heavier focus on storytelling, new gameplay mechanics, and a multiplayer feature. Nintendo launched a viral marketing campaign that included several websites written as if taking place in the Metroid universe. The single-player mode was acclaimed for its graphics, atmosphere and music, though its steep difficulty and multiplayer mode were criticized.

Echoes received several awards and spots on "top games" lists by Nintendo Power and IGN. More than 1.10 million copies were sold worldwide. A sequel, Metroid Prime 3: Corruption was released in 2007. In 2009, an enhanced version of Echoes was released for Wii in Japan and as part of Metroid Prime: Trilogy.

== Gameplay ==
The player, controlling as Samus Aran, battles against the Pirate Commandos. The head-up display shows a radar, map and remaining ammunition.

Metroid Prime 2: Echoes is an adventure game "with heavy action elements and an emphasis on complex puzzle-solving" in which the player controls Samus Aran from a first-person perspective. It takes place in an open-ended world with interconnected areas. Gameplay involves solving puzzles to uncover secrets, platform jumping, and shooting enemies. Progress requires both dimensions to be explored, using power-ups that Samus acquires over time. Equipment players collect include the Screw Attack, which allows Samus to somersault in midair and off certain surfaces, and new beam weapons that have limited ammunition. (Note: Multiple references, including:)

The head-up display simulates the inside of Samus' helmet and features a radar, map, missile ammunition meter and health meter. Several visors are available, and each performs a different function. One, also seen in the previous game, is a scanner that searches for enemy weaknesses, interfaces with mechanisms such as force fields and elevators and retrieves text entries from certain sources. The others reveal and highlight interdimensional objects or cloaked enemies, and create a visual representation of sound.

Echoes features the parallel dimensions Light Aether and Dark Aether; changes in either dimension often reflect changes in the other. Although the maps in both dimensions have the same general layout, rooms often vary in their designs, creatures, and objects. Dark Aether's atmosphere is caustic and damages Samus' Power Suit, requiring the player to move between "safe zones" that allow Samus' health to slowly regenerate. Safe zones are either permanent, or need to be activated by firing certain beam weapons at force field generators. Power Suit upgrades can reduce or nullify damage caused by the atmosphere.

Echoes features a multiplayer mode that allows up to four players to engage in combat using a split screen. It has six arenas and two modes: Deathmatch, in which players attempt to kill their opponents as many times as possible within a set amount of time; and Bounty, which focuses on collecting coins that injured characters drop. Multiplayer in Echoes features the same control scheme as the single-player mode, including the lock-on system for circle strafing while targeting.

== Synopsis ==
=== Setting ===
Echoes takes place on Aether, a planet inhabited by a race known as the Luminoth. The Luminoth lived peacefully, protecting the planet's natural energy, which they call the "Light of Aether". Five decades prior, a Phazon meteor collides into the planet and leaves a scar, causing environmental damage and splitting the planetary energy. The split creates another world in an alternate dimension, Dark Aether, a mirror version of Aether that is dark, arid, and has a poisonous atmosphere. Dark Aether becomes home to the Ing, cruel shapeshifting creatures who intend to destroy the Luminoth, and are able to possess bodies of the living, the dead, and the artificially intelligent beings. Eventually, the Ing and the Luminoth engage in a war over the planet's energy — whichever race controls it is capable of destroying the other, since if one world gains control over all of the planet's energy, the other will perish.

Around this time, Space Pirates set up a base on Aether after detecting the mutagenic substance Phazon on the planet. The Pirates had previously tried to weaponize the substance after it contaminated the planet of Tallon IV, but their efforts were thwarted by the bounty hunter Samus Aran. (Note: As depicted in Metroid Prime) A Galactic Federation Marine Corps patrol ship encounters one of the Pirates' supply ships leaving the planet and an altercation follows. Both ships suffer heavy damage, and after the Federation loses contact with the Marines, they call Samus to investigate.

=== Plot ===
While looking for the Marines near Aether, Samus' ship is damaged by severe lightning storms from the planet. Said storms have caused electromagnetic interference that prevented the Marines from communicating with the Federation. Samus finds the troops dead and surrounded by hive creatures called Splinters. The deceased Marines suddenly rise and attack her, apparently possessed, and she fights them off. Samus then encounters her evil doppelgänger, Dark Samus, for the first time, and after a small skirmish Dark Samus jumps through a portal. Samus decides to follow her through it and ends up on Dark Aether, a vile trans-dimensional duplicate of Aether, where she is attacked by a group of dark creatures called Ing, who capture Samus and after stealing the weapons from her suit, throw her back through the portal.

Upon returning to Aether, Samus learns that the Marines were attacked and killed by Ing-possessed Splinters, and decides to enter a nearby alien temple structure to look for clues. When she reaches the structure, she meets U-Mos, the last remaining sentinel of the Luminoth, an alien race that have fought against the Ing for decades and are now on the verge of defeat. He tells Samus that after a meteor struck Aether, it created "Dark Aether", from which the Ing spawned. He also tells Samus that the Ing have taken virtually all of the 'Light of Aether', the entire collective planetary energy for Aether that keeps the planet stable, and begs her to retrieve it, for if either world gains control over all of this energy, the other will perish. To reclaim the parts of Aether's energy taken by the Ing, she makes use of an energy transfer module, which the Ing that possessed the Alpha Splinter she fought just before the structure just so happened to have.

Samus goes to three regions—the Agon Wastes, a parched, rocky, desert wasteland region; Torvus Bog, a drenched swamp area that houses a partially submerged hydrosubstation; and the Sanctuary Fortress, a high-technology cliffside fortress built by the Luminoth filled with corrupted robots that serves as the Ing hive in Dark Aether—to retrieve the Light of Aether and return it to the Luminoth temples. Samus fights Space Pirates, Dark Samus, and monstrous Ing guardians on her mission. After Samus reclaims three pieces of the Light of Aether, she enters the Ing's Sky Temple and faces the Emperor Ing, the strongest Ing who guards the remaining Light of Aether. Samus defeats the creature and retrieves the last remaining energy, causing Dark Aether to become critically unstable and begin to collapse, but her path out of the temple's gateway is blocked by a horribly altered and unstable Dark Samus. After defeating her foe in the final battle, Samus is surrounded by a group of Warrior Ing desperate to save their world and their lives; she escapes to Aether through a newly revealed portal just before Dark Aether and the Ing disappear forever.

Returning to U-Mos, Samus finds that the remaining Luminoth were in a state of hibernation but have now awakened. After a brief celebration, Samus leaves Aether in her repaired gunship. If the player completes the game with all of the items obtained, Dark Samus is shown reforming herself above Aether.

== Development ==
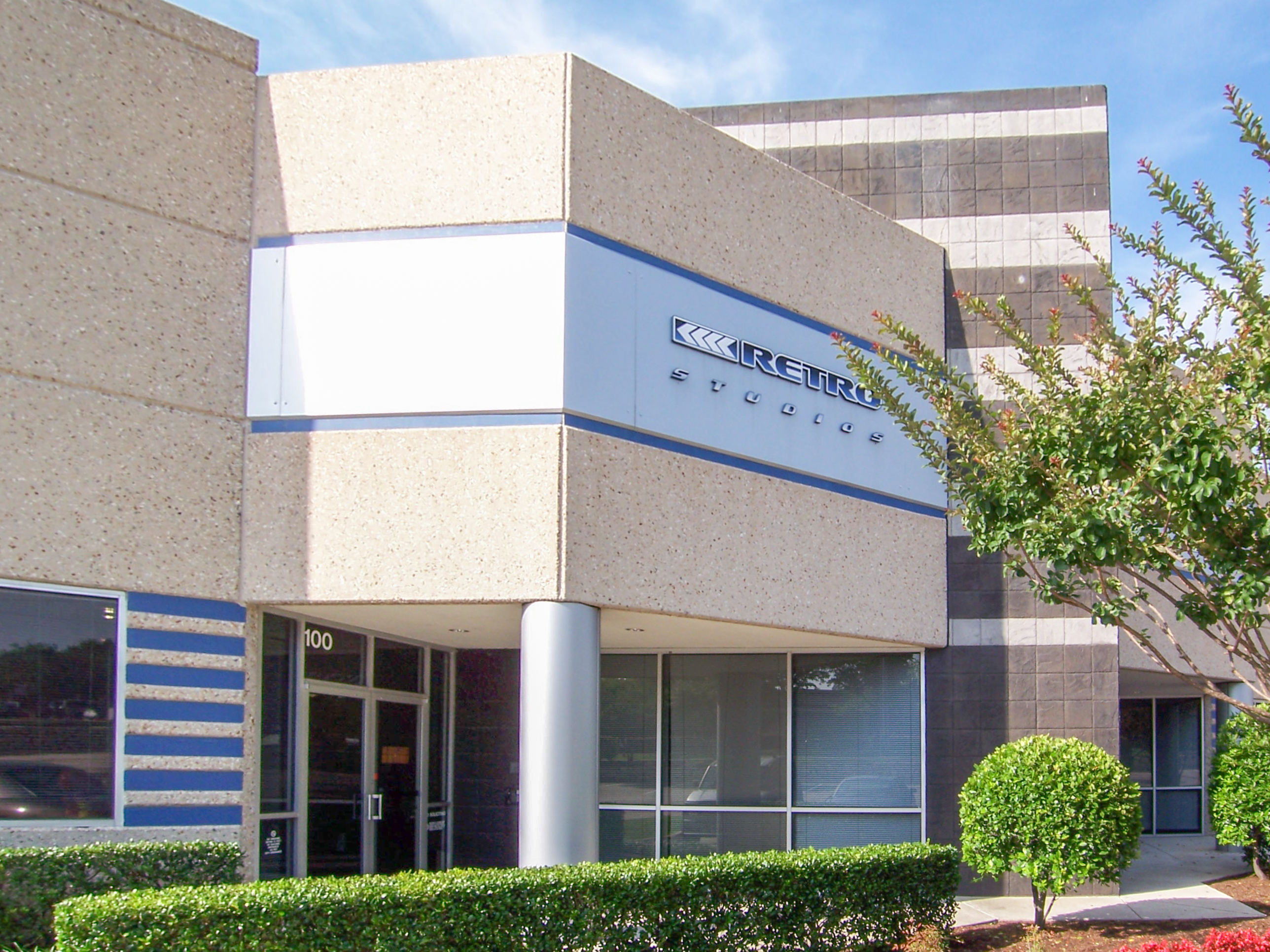
Retro Studios, based in Austin, Texas, developed the Metroid Prime games.

After the success of Metroid Prime (2002), Nintendo asked Retro Studios to produce a sequel. They decided against recycling the features of the first game, and instead used new sound models, weapon effects, and art designs. They also implemented the Screw Attack and wall jumping features seen in previous Metroid games, which were not incorporated in the first Prime due to time constraints. Another element considered for the previous game was the multiplayer component. Since Metroid Prime was a first-person adventure and its deathmatch mode could not easily replicate other shooting games, Retro just tried to "make a multiplayer experience that fans of Metroid games would instantly know and recognise".

The staff opted for a more immersive storyline, with more cut scenes and a plot that focused less on the Space Pirates and Metroids of other Metroid games. The theme of light and dark originated from "something that everyone understands: the conflict between good and evil". Senior designer Mike Wikan said: "We wanted a push and pull, the whole game is pushing and pulling you back and forth between the dark and the light. It ended up being that we wanted something that would feed into that dichotomy, that conflict between the two, and how the player's basic abilities reflect that". The developers sought advice from the producers of the Nintendo game The Legend of Zelda: A Link to the Past, which also used the theme of parallel worlds.

For Dark Samus, Retro wanted to create a character that was similar to Samus and be the same size, as opposed to the enormous monsters of Metroid Prime. One inspiration was a boss battle in Metroid: Zero Mission, in which Samus fights a mirror image of herself. The developers considered Dark Samus a "natural choice" because it fit in well with the "dramatic feel of dark and light".

Whereas Metroid Prime was intended to familiarize players with the control scheme, Retro made Echoes more challenging. They targeted a more hardcore audience, making the player always worry about their health, and added more unique boss fights. Two bosses were made more difficult in the final days of development following a request by producer Kensuke Tanabe to "make it tighter". Wikan regretted, and reduced the difficulty when adapting Prime 2 for the compilation Metroid Prime: Trilogy. Development was more difficult than the team had expected, and Retro president Michael Kelbaugh said: "We wanted to expand and add to the title, and not just slam out a sequel. Nintendo doesn't do things that way." Some features, such as a hidden version of Super Metroid (1994), were canceled for lack of time. Tanabe later said that Echoes was only about thirty percent complete three months before the deadline Nintendo had set for a 2004 holiday release.

The music was composed by Kenji Yamamoto. The themes used for areas on Dark Aether are dark variations of the themes used for the same areas on Light Aether. Some remixes of music from the previous Metroid games were also used, with the escape theme being a remix of Metroid's "Escape" theme, the "Hunters" multiplayer theme taking on Super Metroid's "Upper Brinstar" theme, and the theme for the underwater Torvus region, the "Lower Brinstar" theme from the same game.

== Release ==
Metroid Prime 2: Echoes was released for the GameCube in North America on November 15, 2004, Europe on November 26, and in Australia on December 2. The PAL version lacked the standard 50 Hz mode, and offered 60 Hz mode only. In Japan, it was released on May 26, 2005 as Metroid Prime 2: Dark Echoes.

=== Marketing ===
Nintendo launched several websites to initiate a viral marketing campaign for Echoes, with inspiration drawn from Halo 2's alternate reality game I Love Bees. The websites included Luminoth Temple, an Internet forum; Channel 51, a conspiracy theory website that featured grainy QuickTime videos of Metroid Prime 2 as if it were footage of extraterrestrials; Orbis Labs, which sold a "self-contained armored machine" called "Battle Sphere", similar to the Morph Ball; and Athena Astronautics, which advertised sending women into space, featured a blog, and offered job positions for bounty hunters on Monster.com. Athena Astronautics gave a random selection of 25 people who replied to the offer an "interactive training manual", which was in fact a free copy of Metroid Prime 2: Echoes. A promotional disc was also released leading up to the launch, containing a demo, trailers and an interactive Metroid timeline.

A Metroid-related spoof of "I Love Bees" appeared online in October 2004, to which Nintendo reacted by stating that it was not involved with it. The campaign featured similarly named domain names such as ilovebeams.com, which each had an image of Samus with the caption: "All your bees are belong to us. Never send a man to do a woman's job".

=== Re-releases ===
Echoes was re-released in Japan in 2009 for the Wii console, as part of the New Play Control! series. It has revamped controls that use the Wii Remote's pointing functionality, similar to those of Metroid Prime 3: Corruption. The credit system from Corruption is also included to unlock the original bonus content, as well as the ability to take snapshots of gameplay. The difficulty of the boss battles in Echoes was also lowered. The Wii version of Echoes was released in North America and Europe on August 24 as part of the compilation Metroid Prime: Trilogy, which also includes Metroid Prime and Metroid Prime 3: Corruption. Both Prime and Echoes contain all of the enhancements found in their Japanese New Play Control! counterparts. Trilogy was re-released on the Wii U's Nintendo eShop on January 29, 2015.

== Reception ==
=== Critics ===
Reception

Aggregate scores
Aggregator	Score
GameRankings	92% (69 reviews)
Metacritic	92/100 (60 reviews)

Review scores
Publication	Score
1Up.com	A
Eurogamer	9/10
Game Informer	9.5/10
GamePro	5/5
GameSpot	9.1/10
GameSpy	5/5
IGN	9.5/10
X-Play	4/5

In December 2019, review aggregator website GameRankings ranked Metroid Prime 2: Echoes as the ninth best GameCube game and the 281st best game of all time. Comparing it to Metroid Prime, GameSpot's Brad Shoemaker said that Echoes was as good as its predecessor, and delivered everything he expected. IGN's Matt Casamassina called the gameplay "superb" and "nearly flawless", and Vicious Sid of GamePro praised Echoes as "an extraordinary return to form". Kristan Reed of Eurogamer said it was one of the best single-player experiences on the GameCube, and found the story "intricately designed and elaborately constructed into a coherent environment". GameSpot and IGN praised the campaign as lengthy and rewarding. Computer and Video Games called Echoes essential for anyone who owned a GameCube and said it would be appropriate for any age. GamePro praised the dark-and-light dynamic and with the "simple, quirky, and ridiculously addictive" multiplayer mode.

Echoes' graphics and design received praise; GameSpot considered them some of the best on the GameCube, and IGN called Echoes "gorgeous" and "one of the prettiest GameCube titles". The Guardian's Nick Gillett found it entertaining and that its maps, terrain, and bestiary made for an amazing epic space adventure. Bryn Williams from GameSpy found it challenging but fair, and praised the controls and level design.

A major criticism of Echoes focused on the high difficulty. Game Informer wrote that the boss fights were "unforgiving" and the environments sometimes confusing. Some reviewers found it difficult to search for the Sky Temple keys. GameSpot criticized the search and called it "a scavenger hunt much tougher than the rest of the game", and 1UP.com said its only purposes was to artificially extend the game length. The multiplayer mode was also considered by some to be unsatisfying. GameSpy called it a "secondary feature", The Age's Jason Hill called it "bland and dull" and Eurogamer said that the single-player features did not translate well to that mode. Game Informer criticized the multiplayer mode because of its inclusion of the lock-on mechanism, considering it a feature that made multiplayer too simple.

IGN was critical of Echoes' graphics and noted that the textures sometimes blurred when viewed up close, and the frame rate occasionally decreased. Publications including IGN and The Independent considered the gameplay too similar to Metroid Prime, while GamePro was unhappy that the controls are not customizable . Computer and Video Games and The Age were disappointed that Echoes was not as innovative in terms of gameplay as Metroid Prime. The Age's review also found the control scheme "unwieldy" and the difficulty "unforgiving". Serge Pennings of The Observer felt there were too few opportunities to save. X-Play said most of the difficulty was "because the save system is poorly implemented and downright cheap".

==== Awards ====
Echoes won an award in almost every category it was nominated for at the 2004 Nintendo Power Awards, and won awards for Best GameCube Game of 2004 from IGN, Electronic Gaming Monthly, and GameSpy. The game was a finalist in GameSpot's 2004 "Best Action Adventure Game" category across all platforms. During the 8th Annual Interactive Achievement Awards, Echoes received nominations for "Console First-Person Action Game of the Year", and outstanding achievement in "Art Direction" and "Visual Engineering". It was rated the 174th best game made on a Nintendo system in Nintendo Power's Top 200 Games list, the 74th best game by GameFAQs users, the 15th best GameCube game by IGN, and the 13th best by GameSpy.

=== Sales ===
Echoes sold 470,000 copies in North America in December 2004. It was the ninth-best-selling game in its debut month in Japan with 16,105 copies sold, ranking it behind Yu Yu Hakusho Forever and Hanjuku Hero 4: 7-Jin no Hanjuku Hero. By August 2009, 800,000 copies had sold worldwide. The game ultimately sold more than 1.1 million copies worldwide.
