= Metroid Prime =

2002 video game

- North American box art
- Developer: Retro Studios (Note: Remastered contains additional work by Iron Galaxy Studios, Airship Images Limited, Atomhawk Design, CGBot, Gamesim Inc, Liquid Development, Original Force LTD, Shanghai Mineloader Digital Technology, and Zombot Studio.)
- Publisher: Nintendo
- Director: Mark Pacini
- Producers: Shigeru Miyamoto; Kensuke Tanabe; Kenji Miki; Akira Otani; Michael Mann
- Programmer: Mark Johnston
- Artists: Todd Keller; James Dargie
- Composers: Kenji Yamamoto; Kouichi Kyuma
- Series: Metroid
- Platforms: GameCube; Wii; Nintendo Switch
- Release: November 18, 2002: GameCube; NA: November 18, 2002; JP: February 28, 2003; EU: March 21, 2003; AU: April 3, 2003; Wii; JP: February 19, 2009; Nintendo Switch; WW: February 9, 2023
- Genre: Action-adventure
- Mode: Single-player

Metroid Prime is a 2002 action-adventure game developed by Retro Studios and published by Nintendo for the GameCube. It is the fifth main Metroid game, and the first to use 3D computer graphics and a first-person perspective. It was released in North America in November 2002 and in Japan and Europe the following year. Along with the Game Boy Advance game Metroid Fusion, released simultaneously in North America, Prime marked the return of the Metroid series after an eight-year hiatus following Super Metroid (1994).

Prime is set shortly after the events of the original Metroid (1986). Players control the bounty hunter Samus Aran as she battles the Space Pirates and their biological experiments harnessing deposits of the chemical Phazon on the planet Tallon IV. Metroid Prime was a collaboration between Retro in Austin, Texas, and Japanese Nintendo employees, including producers Shigeru Miyamoto and Kensuke Tanabe. Miyamoto suggested the project after visiting Retro's headquarters in 2000. As exploration takes precedence over combat, Nintendo described Prime as a "first-person adventure" rather than a first-person shooter.

Metroid Prime sold more than 2.8 million copies worldwide, making it the best-selling Metroid game until Metroid Dread (2021). It won a number of Game of the Year awards and is regarded as one of the greatest video games, remaining one of the highest-rated games on Metacritic.

Metroid Prime was followed by Metroid Prime 2: Echoes (2004), Metroid Prime 3: Corruption (2007), and Metroid Prime 4: Beyond (2025). In 2009, an enhanced version of Metroid Prime was released for the Wii in Japan and as part of the Metroid Prime: Trilogy compilation internationally. A remastered version was released on the Nintendo Switch in 2023.

== Gameplay ==
Samus in battle with a Flying Pirate. The player character is controlled from a first-person perspective.

Metroid Prime is an action-adventure game in which players control protagonist Samus Aran from a first-person perspective, unlike previous games in the Metroid series, with third-person elements used for Morph Ball mode. The gameplay involves solving puzzles to reveal secrets, platform jumping, and shooting foes with the help of a "lock-on" mechanism that allows circle strafing while staying aimed at the enemy. As exploration takes precedence over combat, Nintendo described the game as a "first-person adventure" rather than a first-person shooter (FPS).

Samus must travel through the world of Tallon IV searching for twelve Chozo Artifacts that will open the path to the Phazon meteor impact crater, while collecting power-ups that let her reach new areas. The Varia Suit, for example, protects Samus' armor against high temperatures, allowing her to enter volcanic regions. Some items are obtained after boss fights. Items must be collected in a specific order; for example, players cannot access certain areas until they find a certain Beam to open doors, or discover new ordnance with which to beat bosses. Players are incentivized to explore to find upgrades that increase Samus' maximum ammunition and health.

The heads-up display, which simulates the inside of Samus' helmet, features a radar display, a map, ammunition for missiles, a health meter, a danger meter for negotiating hazardous landscape or materials, and a health bar and name display for bosses. The display can be altered by exchanging visors; one uses thermal imaging, another has x-ray vision, and another features a scanner that searches for enemy weaknesses and interfaces with mechanisms such as force fields and elevators. Short cutscenes appear before important battles, and a scanner in the heads-up display extracts backstory-related information from objects.

Prime introduces a hint system that provides the player with clues about ways to progress. By connecting with the Game Boy Advance game Metroid Fusion using a GameCube–Game Boy Advance link cable, players can unlock Samus's Fusion Suit and an emulated version of the original Metroid (1986).

=== Items ===
While Samus is in Morph Ball form, the view changes to a third-person view.

Throughout the game, players must find and collect items that improve Samus' arsenal and suit, including weapons, armor upgrades for Samus' Power Suit and items that grant abilities—including the Morph Ball, which allows Samus to compress herself into a ball in order to roll into narrow passages and drop energy bombs, and the Grapple Beam, which works by latching onto special hooks called grapple nodes, allowing Samus to swing across gaps. Unlike those in earlier games in the series, the beam weapons in Metroid Prime have no stacking ability, in which the traits of each beam merge. Instead, the player must cycle the four beam weapons; there are charge combos with radically different effects for each. Other upgrades include boots that allow Samus to double-jump and a Spider Ball upgrade that allows her to climb magnetic rails.

Items from previous Metroid games appear with altered functions. Art galleries and additional ending cutscenes are unlockable if the player collects a high percentage of items and Scan Visor logs. Prime is one of the first Metroid games to address the reason Samus does not start with power-ups acquired in previous games; she begins the game with some upgrades, including the Varia Suit, Missiles and Grapple Beam, but they are lost during an explosion on the Space Pirate frigate Orpheon. The producers stated that starting with some power-ups was a way to give the player "different things to do" and to learn the functions of these items before settling into the core gameplay.

== Plot ==
Five decades prior, the Chozo race fell after a meteor impacted on the planet Tallon IV. The meteor contaminated the planet with a corruptive, mutagenic substance that the villainous Space Pirates later named Phazon, and also brought with it a creature known to the Chozo as "The Worm". A large containment field emitter of the Artifact Temple in the Tallon Overworld area was built as a seal to the meteor's energies and influence within the crater where it landed, which the Space Pirates attempt to disable or bypass in order to gain better access to extract the Phazon. The containment field is controlled by twelve Chozo artifacts that are scattered around the planet.

Not long after defeating Mother Brain and Space Pirate forces on the planet Zebes, (Note: As depicted in Metroid and Metroid: Zero Mission) Samus Aran intercepts a distress signal from the Space Pirate frigate Orpheon, whose crew have been slaughtered by the Pirates' own genetically modified, experimental subjects. At the ship's core, she battles with the Parasite Queen, a giant version of the tiny parasites aboard the ship. The Parasite Queen is defeated and falls into the ship's reactor core, initiating the destruction of the ship. While Samus is escaping from the frigate, she encounters a cybernetic version of Ridley called Meta Ridley, who also escapes. During her escape, an explosion damages Samus' suit, causing some of her abilities to malfunction. Samus escapes the frigate and chases Ridley in her gunship towards the nearby planet Tallon IV.

After landing in the Tallon Overworld, Samus explores nearby areas of Tallon IV and discovers ruins of an ancient Chozo settlement. As she explores the ruins, she learns that the Chozo on the planet had been killed off by the Phazon infesting the planet, which originated from a meteor that impacted on the planet many years ago. After regaining her lost abilities in the ruins, as well as defeating a mutated plant creature that was poisoning the local water supply, Samus finds her way to the Magmoor Caverns, a series of magma-filled tunnels, which are used by the Space Pirates as a source of geothermal power. Following the tunnels, Samus travels to the Phendrana Drifts, a cold, mountainous region which is home to another ancient Chozo ruin and a Space Pirate research laboratory, Glacial One, used to study the Metroids. After obtaining new abilities, Samus explores the wreckage of the crashed Orpheon and then infiltrates the Phazon Mines, where she learns the outcome of the Phazon experimentation project, including the Metroid Prime, a creature that had come to Tallon IV with the meteor. Advancing deeper into the mines, Samus fights her way through the Phazon-enhanced Space Pirates and obtains the Phazon Suit after defeating the monstrous Omega Pirate.

At some point, Samus discovers the Artifact Temple that the Chozo built to contain the Metroid Prime and to stop the Phazon from spreading over the planet. To gain access to the meteor's Impact Crater, Samus must collect and unite the twelve Chozo artifacts. As Samus returns to the temple with the artifacts, Meta Ridley appears and attacks her. Samus defeats Ridley and enters the Impact Crater, where she finds the Metroid Prime. After she defeats it, the Metroid Prime absorbs Samus' Phazon Suit and explodes. Samus escapes the collapsing crater and leaves Tallon IV in her ship. If the player completes the game with all of the items obtained, a post-credits scene shows Metroid Prime reconstructing itself into a body resembling Samus.

== Development ==
Concept artwork of the Impact Crater

According to the producer Shigeru Miyamoto, Nintendo did not develop a Metroid game for the Nintendo 64 as it "couldn't come out with any concrete ideas". Metroid co-creator Yoshio Sakamoto said he could not imagine how the Nintendo 64 controller could be used to control Samus. Nintendo approached another company to make Metroid for Nintendo 64, but the offer was declined, supposedly because the developers thought they could not equal the previous game, Super Metroid (1994).

Metroid Prime was a collaboration between Nintendo EAD and R&D1 and the American company Retro Studios. Retro was created in 1998 by an alliance between Nintendo and Iguana Entertainment founder Jeff Spangenberg. The studio would create games for the forthcoming GameCube targeted at a mature demographic. After establishing its offices in Austin, Texas in 1999, Retro worked on four GameCube projects. When Miyamoto visited Retro in 2000, he suggested a new Metroid game after seeing their prototype FPS engine. In 2000 and early 2001, four games in development at Retro were canceled, including an RPG, Raven Blade, leaving Prime the only game in development. During the last nine months of development, Retro's staff worked 80- to 100-hour weeks to reach Nintendo's deadline. According to senior artist James Dargie, it took them almost six months to do the first level that Nintendo approved, and then they had less than a year to do the rest of the game. Concept artist Android Jones, a lifelong fan of the series whose work included Samus's Varia Suit and most of the art in the Scan Visor, would sleep in the office and resume working when he woke up.

We didn't want to make just another first person shooter. ... Making a first person shooter would have been a cheap and easy way to go. But making sure the themes and concepts in Metroid were kept was something that we wanted to do. And translating those things into 3D was a real challenge. For example, translating the morph ball was one of the hardest things to do.

— Michael Kelbaugh, Retro Studios president since 2003

Nintendo created the music, Retro handled art and engineering, and both teams worked on the overall design. The Japanese team, which included producers Miyamoto, Kensuke Tanabe, Kenji Miki, and designer and Metroid co-creator Sakamoto, communicated with Retro through e-mails, telephone conferences and personal gatherings. The game was planned to use a third-person perspective, but after Miyamoto intervened this was changed to first-person perspective and almost everything already developed was scrapped. The change was prompted by camera problems experienced by Rare, which was developing the Nintendo 64 game Jet Force Gemini. According to the director, Mark Pacini, Miyamoto believed that "shooting in third person was not very intuitive"; Pacini also said that exploration is easier using first-person. Pacini said that after settling that perspective, the team decided not to make a traditional FPS and had to break down the stereotypes of first-person games to make a fun Metroid game.

Pacini said that Retro tried to design the game so that the only difficult parts would be boss battles and players would not be afraid to explore because "the challenge of the game was finding your way around". Senior designer Mike Wikan said that the focus on exploration led the team to spend time making the platform jumping "approachable to the player", and to ensure the gameplay had "shooting [as] a very important, though secondary, consideration". Retro developed the storyline under the supervision of Yoshio Sakamoto, who verified that the ideas were consistent with the earlier games. The developers intended that Kraid, a boss from Metroid and Super Metroid, would appear in Metroid Prime, and designer Gene Kohler modeled and skinned him for that purpose, but he was cut for time reasons. The team considered implementing the Speed Booster power-up from Super Metroid but concluded it would not work well because of the first-person perspective and the limitations imposed by the scale of the environment.

Retro Studios wrote an extensive storyline for Metroid Prime. It was first shown publicly in a ten-second video at Space World 2000. That November, Retro Studios confirmed its involvement in the "job application" part of its website. In February 2001, Nintendo confirmed the game was in development. It was showcased at E3 2001 in May, with its title confirmed as Metroid Prime.

=== Audio ===
Kenji Yamamoto, assisted by Kouichi Kyuma, composed the music for Prime. The soundtrack contains arrangements of tracks from previous games in the series because Yamamoto wanted to satisfy old Metroid fans. The initial Tallon Overworld theme is a reinterpretation of Metroid's Brinstar theme, the music heard in Magmoor Caverns is a new version of the music from Super Metroid's Lower Norfair area, and the music heard during the fight with Meta Ridley is a fast-paced reimagining of the Ridley boss music first featured in Super Metroid, which has reappeared in most Metroid games since. Early in development, the English electronic duo Autechre were asked by Retro Studios to compose the soundtrack, but this was halted by Nintendo. Tommy Tallarico Studios initially provided sound effects, but Miyamoto deemed them not good enough for an extended presentation at Space World 2001. The game supports Dolby Pro Logic II setups and can be played in surround sound. A soundtrack album, Metroid Prime & Fusion Original Soundtracks, was published by Scitron on June 18, 2003.

== Release ==
Metroid Prime was released for the GameCube in North America on November 18, 2002. In 2003, it was released in Japan on February 28, in Europe on March 21, and in Australia on April 3. Along with the Game Boy Advance game Metroid Fusion, released on the same day in North America, Metroid Prime marked the return of Metroid after eight years. In 2004, Nintendo released a Metroid Prime GameCube bundle, including a second disc featuring a trailer and a demo for Metroid Prime 2: Echoes, a timeline of Metroid games and an art gallery.

Metroid Prime was rereleased in Japan in 2009 for the Wii as part of the New Play Control! series. It adds support for the Wii Remote's pointing functionality, bonus content and the ability to take screenshots. In other countries, this version was released in the Wii compilation Metroid Prime: Trilogy. The compilation became available for download from the Wii U's Nintendo eShop in January 2015.

== Sales ==
Metroid Prime became one of the best-selling GameCube games. It was the second-best-selling game of November 2002 in North America, behind Grand Theft Auto: Vice City, selling 250,000 copies in its first week. Eurogamer suggested that Prime being released after Christmas in Europe contributed to the GameCube's decline there.

As of July 2006, Prime had sold more than 1.49 million copies in the US alone and earned more than US$50 million. It was the eighth-bestselling GameCube game in Australia. More than 78,000 copies were sold in Japan, and Nintendo added it to its Player's Choice line in the PAL region. It sold 2.84 million copies worldwide and was the best-selling Metroid game until Metroid Dread (2021).

== Reception ==
Reception

Aggregate scores
Aggregator	Score
Metacritic	97/100 (70 reviews) Remastered; 94/100 (100 reviews)
OpenCritic	100% recommend (Remastered)

Review scores
Publication	Score
AllGame	4.5/5
Edge	9/10
Electronic Gaming Monthly	10/10, 10/10, 10/10
Game Informer	9.5/10
GameSpot	9.7/10
GameSpy	96/100
IGN	9.8/10; 10/10 (Remastered)

Awards
Publication	Award
IGN	Editor's Choice, 2002 Best GameCube Game; 2002 Game of the Year runner-up
GameSpot	Editor's Choice, 2002 Game of the Year
GameSpy	2002 Game of the Year
Electronic Gaming Monthly	Platinum Award, Game of the Year (2002)
Nintendo Power	Game of the Year (2002)
Edge	Editor's Choice, 2002 Game of the Year
6th Annual Interactive Achievement Awards	Console First-Person Action Game of the Year
Game Developers Choice Awards	Game of the Year, Excellence in Level Design (2003)
The Michigan Daily	Best Video Game of 2002

Metroid Prime received "universal acclaim", according to Metacritic. It won numerous Game of the Year awards and was praised for its detailed graphics, special effects, varied environments, moody soundtrack and sound effects, level design, immersive atmosphere and innovative gameplay centered on exploration in contrast with action games such as Halo, while staying faithful to the Metroid formula. Criticisms included the unusual control scheme, lack of focus on the story, and repetitive backtracking. Game Informer considered the control scheme awkward. Entertainment Weekly compared Prime to a "1990s arcade game, filled with over the top battle sequences, spectacular visual effects—and a pretty weak plot", and GamePro wrote that inexperienced players "might find it exhausting to keep revisiting the same old places over and over and over". In 2004, the video game countdown show Filter said Metroid Prime had the best graphics of all time.

During the 6th Annual Interactive Achievement Awards, the Academy of Interactive Arts & Sciences named Metroid Prime the "Console First-Person Action Game of the Year". It was also nominated for "Game of the Year", "Console Game of the Year", "Outstanding Innovation in Console Gaming", and outstanding achievement in "Art Direction", "Game Design", "Gameplay Engineering", "Original Music Composition", "Sound Design", and "Visual Engineering". It was the most nominated game at the awards ceremony.

In 2005, GameSpy named Metroid Prime the third-best GameCube game, behind The Legend of Zelda: The Wind Waker and Resident Evil 4, and in 2007 IGN named it the best. It was named the 10th-greatest Nintendo game by Nintendo Power in 2006 and the 18th-greatest by Official Nintendo Magazine in 2009. In 2010, Nintendo Power ranked it the sixth-best game of the 2000s. It was ranked the 23rd-greatest game ever by IGN in 2012 and voted the 29th-greatest by GameFAQs readers in 2015. In 2009, Wired named Metroid Prime the 10th-most influential game of the decade for popularizing exploration, puzzle-solving, platforming and story in FPS games and "breaking the genre free from the clutches of Doom". Metroid Prime also became popular for speedrunning.

== Legacy ==
Metroid Prime was followed by Metroid Prime 2: Echoes (2004) on the GameCube and Metroid Prime 3: Corruption (2007) on the Wii. They were rereleased on Wii as part of the New Play Control! series in Japan and as part of the compilation Metroid Prime: Trilogy (2009). A pinball game, Metroid Prime Pinball (2005), and the action spin-offs Metroid Prime Hunters (2006) were released for the handheld Nintendo DS console, and Metroid Prime: Federation Force (2016) for the Nintendo 3DS. Metroid Prime 4: Beyond was released in 2025 for the Nintendo Switch and Nintendo Switch 2.

Characters and stages from Metroid Prime have appeared in other Nintendo games, such as the Super Smash Bros series, in which the Frigate Orpheon is a playable stage, with the Parasite Queen in the background and music from Metroid Prime. Metroid Prime's gameplay and HUD influenced FPS games such as Geist and Star Wars: Republic Commando.

=== Unofficial versions ===
A branch of the Dolphin emulator, PrimeHack, was released in 2019. PrimeHack modifies Metroid Prime, adding new high resolution textures, 4K support, improved lighting and keyboard and mouse controls. The project was brought to Steam Deck in 2022 via Emudeck. A demo of a 2D fangame version of Metroid Prime was released in April 2021. Development ended following a cease-and-desist from Nintendo by that August. Another 2D Metroid Prime fangame, Metroid Prime Origins, was released in August 2026.

=== Remaster ===
Metroid Prime Remastered, a high-definition remaster for the Nintendo Switch, was released digitally on February 9, 2023, with a physical release on February 22 in North America and March 3 in Europe and Japan. The remaster was developed by Retro Studios with assistance from developers including Iron Galaxy Studios. It features new visuals, updated control schemes (including options for dual-stick controls, tank controls, pointer controls and a hybrid) and unlockable art.

Metroid Prime Remastered received acclaim. Samuel Claiborn of IGN described it as "a perfect example of how to both honor a lauded classic and bring it up to code". It was criticized for not crediting the developers of previous versions of Metroid Prime by name, instead crediting them as "original Nintendo GameCube and Wii version development staff". As of March 2023, Metroid Prime Remastered had sold 1.09 million copies.
