= Metroid Prime 3: Corruption =

2007 video game

- North American and PAL region box art
- Developer: Retro Studios
- Publisher: Nintendo
- Director: Mark Pacini
- Producer: Kensuke Tanabe
- Programmer: Frank Lafuente
- Artist: Todd Keller
- Composers: Kenji Yamamoto; Minako Hamano; Masaru Tajima
- Series: Metroid
- Platform: Wii
- Release: NA: August 27, 2007; EU: October 26, 2007; AU: November 8, 2007; JP: March 6, 2008
- Genre: Action-adventure
- Mode: Single-player

Metroid Prime 3: Corruption is a 2007 action-adventure game developed by Retro Studios and published by Nintendo for the Wii. The seventh main Metroid game, it was released in North America on August 27, 2007, followed by Europe on October 26, Australia on November 8, and Japan on March 6, 2008.

Corruption is set six months after Metroid Prime 2: Echoes (2004). The player controls the bounty hunter Samus Aran, who becomes infected with Phazon by her doppelgänger, Dark Samus. Samus works to prevent the Phazon from spreading to other planets while being corrupted by the Phazon.

The player uses the Wii Nunchuk to move and the Wii Remote to jump, aim and fire. Corruption introduces features such as Hypermode, which allows Samus to use more powerful attacks, and the ability to command her gunship. The new control scheme took a year to develop and delayed the release several times. The game was first shown to the public at the E3 2005 trade show.

Like the previous Prime games, Corruption received acclaim for its gameplay, graphics and music, though some were divided on the controls. More than one million copies were sold in 2007. It was rereleased in 2009 as part of the compilation Metroid Prime: Trilogy. Metroid Prime 4: Beyond was released on December 4, 2025 for the Nintendo Switch and Nintendo Switch 2.

== Gameplay ==
Samus' HUD. The targeting reticle can be aimed anywhere on the screen using the Wii Remote.

Metroid Prime 3: Corruption is a first-person action-adventure game. The player controls Samus Aran using the Wii Remote and Nunchuk devices. The Nunchuk enables the player to perform actions such as moving Samus and locking on to enemies and targets. The Wii Remote allows the player to execute actions such as jumping, aiming, and firing weapons.

Corruption is an open-ended game that takes place across several planets, each with regions connected by elevators, rail systems and bridges. Each region has rooms separated by doors that can be opened when shot with the correct weapon. The gameplay involves solving puzzles to uncover secrets, jumping on platforms, and shooting enemies with the help of a "lock-on" mechanism that allows Samus to move in a circle while staying aimed on an enemy. The "lock-on" mechanism also allows Samus to use the Grapple Beam to attach onto and pull objects, such as enemy shields or certain doors. The game uses a first-person view, except in Morph Ball mode, in which Samus' suit transforms into an armored ball and the game uses a third-person camera. The third person camera is also used in conjunction with the Screw Attack power-up: in this case Samus' suit emits strange energy waves as she performs a continuous jump.

The heads-up display simulates the inside of Samus' helmet, and features a radar, map, ammunition gauge and health meter. The player can change visors to enable new abilities such as X-ray vision, collecting information on many items, creatures and enemies, and interfacing with certain mechanisms such as force fields and elevators. Corruption also includes a hint system that periodically displays on-screen instructions and navigation assistance. The game also has the addition of the Hypermode, a feature in which health is drained to give temporary invincibility and more powerful attacks at the cost of one energy tank. Hypermode will end after 25 seconds or when a gauge that indicates the left-over Phazon is depleted, but if it's filled up completely or Samus gets hit by a Phazon Grenade thrown by a Space Pirate, the player will enter Corrupt Hypermode. If Corrupt Hypermode is not stopped, it leads to a non-standard game over, due to Samus being overtaken by Phazon. Another new feature is the Command Visor, which allows Samus to summon remotely her gunship from a suitable landing site to save the game, or travel to another destination quickly. New abilities can be obtained to allow the ship to perform aerial attacks against enemy targets and transport heavy objects. In the achievement system, players can earn special credits by completing objectives. These credits can be exchanged for bonuses such as concept art, music for the sound test, and decorations for Samus' gunship.

== Synopsis ==
=== Setting ===
Metroid Prime 3: Corruption takes place six months after Metroid Prime 2: Echoes. The protagonist, Samus Aran, is a bounty hunter hired to assist the Galactic Federation during its ongoing conflict with the Space Pirates. After facing defeat on the planet Zebes during the events of the first Metroid, the Space Pirates sought to gain power by using a newly discovered mutagen called Phazon, but Samus managed to disrupt their operations throughout the Prime trilogy, while the Galactic Federation confiscated and repurposed their Phazon armaments.

The Space Pirates' operation was left in disarray following defeat in Metroid Prime 2: Echoes. They inadvertently encounter Dark Samus, Samus' sinister doppelgänger, while trying to harvest Phazon. Dark Samus eliminates a third of their forces while indoctrinating the remaining Space Pirates into servants. Their combined forces seek to corrupt the universe with Phazon by first executing a series of methodical attacks on three Federation planets: Norion, Bryyo and Elysia. The game is primarily centered on these planets and three other locations that become accessible after completing certain in-game tasks.

=== Plot ===
Fleet Admiral Castor Dane (Timothy Patrick Miller), the commander of the Galactic Federation flagship GFS Olympus, calls for a meeting with Samus Aran and three other bounty hunters—Rundas (Christopher Sabat), Ghor (Edwin Neal), and Gandrayda (Claire Hamilton). The bounty hunters receive orders to clear a virus from several organic supercomputers called "Aurora Units" (Lainie Frasier), located throughout the galaxy. The meeting ends abruptly when Space Pirates attack the Federation fleet. Samus and the other bounty hunters are deployed to the planet Norion, where a Space Pirate force led by Ridley is concentrating an attack on the main Federation base. While suppressing the attack, Samus learns that a Phazon meteoroid, called a Leviathan Seed, will soon collide into Norion. Samus and the other bounty hunters attempt to activate the base's defense systems, when they are suddenly attacked by Dark Samus and knocked out by a Phazon Beam. With the other bounty hunters unconscious, a severely wounded Samus manages to activate the system just in time to destroy the Leviathan Seed before falling into a coma.

A month later, Samus awakens aboard Olympus, where she learns that Dark Samus' Phazon-based attacks have corrupted her. The Federation equips her suit with a Phazon Enhancement Device (PED) that enables her to harness the Phazon energy within herself. She is informed that her fellow bounty hunters, also corrupted with Phazon and equipped with PEDs, have gone missing during their missions to investigate several planets embedded with Leviathan Seeds. Samus is first sent to the planet Bryyo and later Elysia to determine what happened to her missing comrades. She soon discovers that both planets and their inhabitants are slowly being corrupted by the Leviathan Seeds and that she must destroy the seeds to reverse this. Samus encounters heavy resistance from the Space Pirates, Phazon-corrupted monstrosities, and her fellow bounty hunters who have been corrupted by Dark Samus.

Throughout her mission, which eventually takes her to the Space Pirate homeworld, Samus slowly becomes further corrupted by Phazon. She stops the Space Pirate assault with the assistance of the Federation troops. After defeating a Phazon-empowered Ridley, Samus and the Federation fleet use a stolen Leviathan battleship to create a wormhole that leads to the planet Phaaze, the origin of Phazon. Samus travels to the planet's core, where she finally defeats Dark Samus and then the corrupted Aurora Unit 313. Dark Samus is obliterated, and Phaaze explodes, possibly rendering all Phazon in the galaxy inert. The Federation fleet escapes Phaaze's destruction, but loses contact with Samus in the process. Samus eventually appears in her gunship, and reports that the mission is accomplished before flying into space.

Samus returns to Elysia, where she mourns the loss of her fellow bounty hunters. If the player completes the game with all of the items obtained, Samus flies into hyperspace with Sylux's spaceship following her.

== Development ==
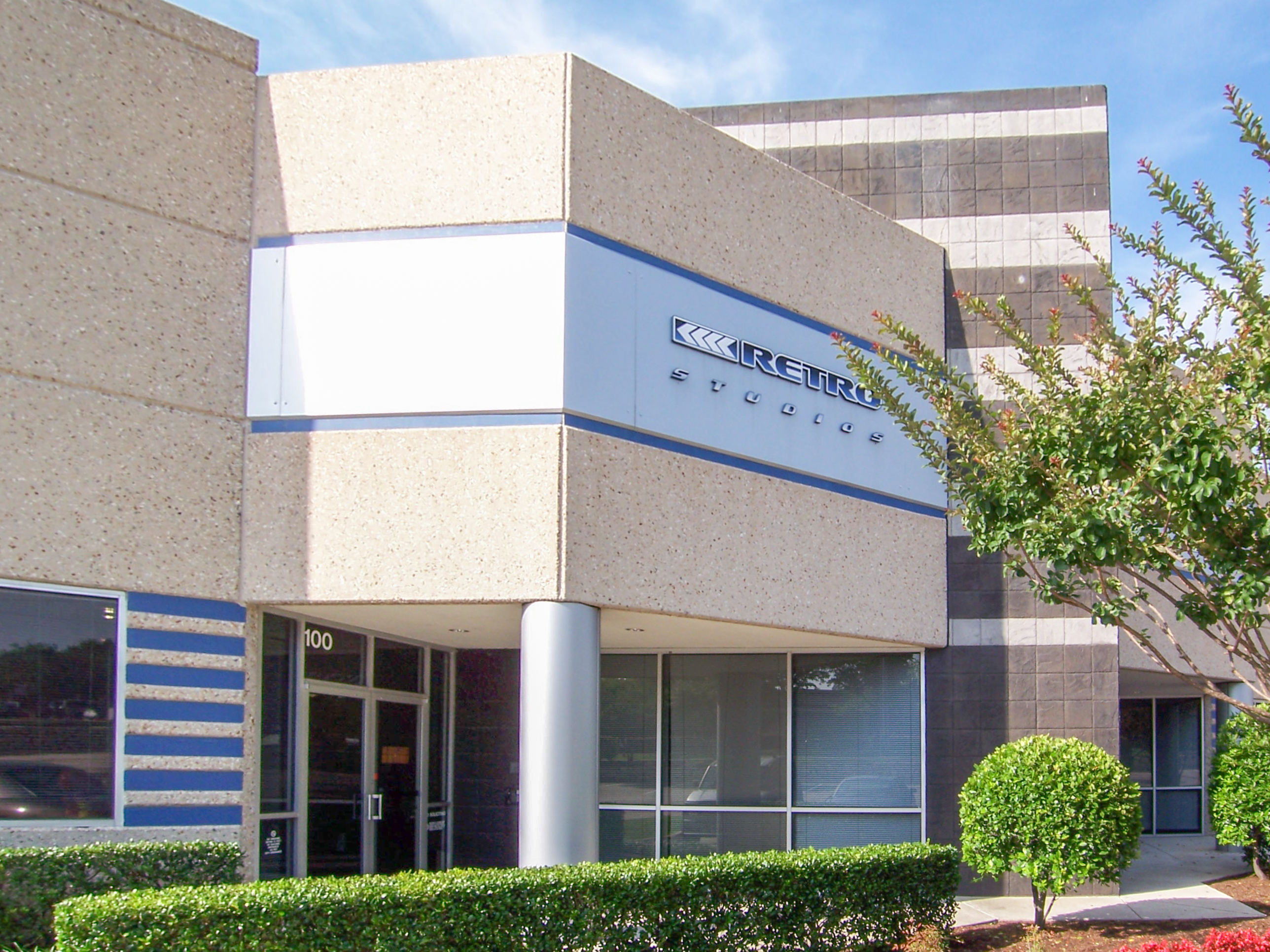
Retro Studios, based in Austin, Texas, developed the Metroid Prime games.

Retro Studios intended to give Metroid Prime 3: Corruption larger environments than Metroid Prime 2: Echoes, including open world features, and to have it run at 60 frames per second. Retro canceled plans for more interactive sequences involving Samus' ship when they found the Wii was less powerful than they had expected. They were also interested in using the WiiConnect24 feature to provide additional content accessible from the internet.

As Samus is a bounty hunter, Retro initially planned to have Samus embark on missions to collect bounties. Nintendo opposed this, saying she was driven by altruism rather than profit. Eventually, Retro discovered that the Japanese Nintendo staff imagined a bounty hunter as a selfless hero rather than someone who captures fugitives for money.

Retro announced that Corruption would be the final chapter of the Prime series and would have a plot "about closure, told against the backdrop of an epic struggle". After the Wii Remote was revealed, Nintendo demonstrated how Metroid Prime 3 would take advantage of it with a version of Echoes modified for the Wii and shown at the Tokyo Game Show in 2005. At the Media Summit held by Nintendo in May 2007, the Nintendo of America president, Reggie Fils-Aimé, said that Metroid games "never played this way before", and that Nintendo employees said it would "reinvent the control scheme for a first-person shooter".

The director, Mark Pacini, said that Retro's biggest concern was the controls, which had "too many functions for the amount of buttons". Pacini also said the Wii Zapper, a gun shell peripheral, was never considered because it was unveiled when the development was almost done. The Retro president, Michael Kelbaugh, said the delays gave them more time to tune the controller, which took a year. He also said that while he felt Retro did "a great job" on the Echoes multiplayer, they focused on the single-player for Corruption, which they considered the franchise's core strength. The art director, Todd Keller, said the graphics team focused on texture detail and variety, making every room unique. Nintendo EAD suggested Retro turn Hypermode into the core of the game, saying it would enhance the tension as it made players powerful but leads to a game over if used excessively. Retro initially felt it would be too difficult to implement the feature without dampening the entertainment value, but after discussion turned Hypermode into a regular functionality. Engineer Paul Tozour cited the Halo series as an influence.

The soundtrack was composed by Kenji Yamamoto, Minako Hamano and Masaru Tajima. The increase in the Wii's increased RAM allowed for higher-quality audio samples. Yamamoto used Hirokazu Tanaka's musical design of the original Metroid (1986), keeping the music and themes dark and scary until the uplifting music of the credits. Corruption is the first Metroid game to feature a significant amount of voice acting; previously, Samus "[acted] alone [... and] always came across as a lone wolf". The producers included voices to create a stronger connection between players and the characters. The voices were performed by Timothy Patrick Miller, Lainie Frasier, Christopher Sabat, Edwin Neal, Claire Hamilton, Brian Jepson, Gray Haddock, Clayton Kjas and Ken Webster.

== Release ==
Metroid Prime 3: Corruption was first shown to the public at the Electronic Entertainment Expo (E3) 2005 in a short pre-rendered trailer. It was later announced during Nintendo's press conference at E3 2006. Nintendo revealed in May that Corruption would be released as a launch game for the Wii console, but a few months later it was delayed to 2007. That year in April, Fils-Aimé said in an interview that Corruption was "not going to ship by June" and set it at a summer release date at the earliest. In late April, IGN editor Matt Casamassina revealed it would be released on August 20 in the United States. Nintendo of America moved the release date to August 27, but Nintendo finally revealed an "in stores" date of August 28. The game was released in Europe on October 26, and in Japan on March 6, 2008. In the Japanese version, the difficulty level is decided by answering to "a questionnaire from the Galactic Federation", in contrast to the North American version where the difficulty level is chosen directly by the player. Metroid Prime series producer Kensuke Tanabe said that an idea for a questionnaire came from Retro Studios.

Casamassina initially criticized Nintendo for its minimal marketing campaign for Corruption and compared it to the larger campaign for the original Metroid Prime, which included a live-action advertisement. He concluded that the campaign was the result of Nintendo's new focus on casual games for their console. When questioned, Nintendo of America responded: "Nintendo fans will be surprised by the quantity and quality of Metroid Prime 3: Corruption information that becomes available before the game launches on Aug. 27. Your patience will be rewarded (or Corrupted)". Following this promise, Nintendo released the "Metroid Prime 3 Preview" channel on August 10 in North America and on October 15 in Europe. The channel, available as a free download via the Wii Shop Channel, allowed Wii owners to view preview videos that included a battle sequence and previously unannounced details on new characters. The Preview channel was the first in a series of new downloadable content including videos made available in North America. The "month of Metroid", as named by Nintendo, included Virtual Console versions of Metroid, available on August 13, and Super Metroid, available on August 20.

=== Re-release ===
Metroid Prime 3: Corruption was rereleased on August 24, 2009 in North America and Europe, alongside Metroid Prime and Metroid Prime 2: Echoes, as the compilation Metroid Prime: Trilogy. Prime and Echoes feature the motion controls and achievement systems introduced in Corruption. The compilation was rereleased on the Wii U's Nintendo eShop on January 29, 2015.

== Reception ==
Reviews

Aggregate score
| Aggregator | Score |
|---|---|
| Metacritic | 90/100 (62 reviews) |

Review scores
| Publication | Score |
|---|---|
| 1Up.com | A |
| Electronic Gaming Monthly | 26/30 |
| Famitsu | 31/40 |
| Game Informer | 9.5/10 |
| GameRevolution | B+ |
| GameSpot | 8.5/10 |
| GameTrailers | 9.6/10 |
| IGN | 9.5/10 |
| Nintendo Power | 10/10 |
| Nintendo World Report | 9.5/10 |
| Official Nintendo Magazine | 94% |
| X-Play | 4/5 |

Metroid Prime 3: Corruption received acclaim. Nintendo Power praised the visuals and the immersive gameplay, and called it one of the best Wii games. IGN awarded it the Editor's Choice Award, and wrote that it was beautifully designed and the best-looking game for the Wii. They also praised the voice acting, in contrast to the lack of any voice acting in most other Nintendo games. Despite stating that Metroid Prime 3 was too similar to its predecessors, the review concluded that it was the best game in the Prime trilogy. IGN also said that it could be worthy of the same score as the original Metroid Prime (9.8), had it not been for the aforementioned reason. X-Play found it enjoyable, but it had a few awkward control mechanics and was a little difficult to control on the Wii. They also said that although it was fun, there were problems that lead to odd lock-on mechanics and painful wrists from continuous motions.

Shane Satterfield from GameTrailers praised the more user-friendly and action-packed nature of the game compared to Metroid Prime and Echoes. Satterfield also praised the superior motion-sensitive controls and further added that those elements make Corruption "far superior to the original Metroid Prime". 1UP.com was enthusiastic about the new control system and said the graphics were "some of the best visuals in gaming, period". Electronic Gaming Monthly gave Corruption a Silver award and named it one of the Games of the Month. GameSpot stated the game had enjoyable puzzles, boss battles, atmospheric levels, and smooth gameplay. It also explained that the game was more like a traditional shooter video game than an adventure shooter, and stated that the motion activated actions were too unresponsive.

GamesRadar named Metroid Prime 3: Corruption the 10th-best Wii game, highlighting the shooting system and called it "the ultimate achievement" for the series. In IGN's Best of 2007 Awards, Corruption received the awards for Best Wii Adventure Game, Best Artistic Design, and Best Overall Adventure Game. GameSpy ranked it as the second best Wii game of the year, behind Super Mario Galaxy, and honored it as the Best Innovation on the Wii. The Australian website MyWii named Prime 3 as the second-best Wii game, behind Super Mario Galaxy. In 2009, Official Nintendo Magazine called the game a "fantastic finale", placing it 35th on a list of greatest Nintendo games. Corruption was the fifth best-selling-game of August 2007, with 218,100 copies sold. It also debuted at number five on the Japanese charts, with 34,000 units in the first week of release. Nintendo reported that 1.14 million copies had been sold in 2007. Further updates from Nintendo confirmed that 1.31 million copies had been sold worldwide as of March 2008, and 1.41 million copies as of December 2014.

== Sequels ==
A spin-off, Metroid Prime: Federation Force, was developed by Next Level Games and released for the Nintendo 3DS in 2016. In 2017, Nintendo announced Metroid Prime 4 for Nintendo Switch. Eurogamer reported that Prime 4 was being developed by Bandai Namco Studios. Unsatisfied with the progress, in 2019 Nintendo announced it had restarted development under Retro Studios. In 2024, Nintendo revealed a trailer and the title Metroid Prime 4: Beyond. It was released on December 4, 2025.
