= GameRankings =

American video game review aggregator

- Website type: Gaming
- Successor: Metacritic
- Owner: CBS Interactive
- Creator: Scott Bedard
- Website: gamerankings.com
- Commercial: Yes
- Launched: 1999
- Current status: Shut down in 2019; redirected to Metacritic

GameRankings was a video gaming review aggregator that was founded in 1999. It became part of CNET Networks and later CBS Interactive before Metacritic was acquired. It indexed over 315,000 articles relating to more than 14,500 video games. GameRankings was discontinued in December 2019, with its staff being merged with the similar aggregator Metacritic.

== Rankings ==
GameRankings collected and linked to (but did not host) reviews from other websites and magazines and averages specific ones. While hundreds of reviews may get listed, only the ones that GameRankings deemed notable were used for the average. Scores were culled from numerous American and European sources. The site used a percentage grade for all reviews in order to be able to calculate an average. However, because not all sites use the same scoring system (some rate out of 5 or 10, while others use a letter grade), GameRankings changed all other types of scores into percentages using a relatively straightforward conversion process An A+ was simply 100% or 10/10 and an A was at 95%, and so forth with the same five percent increment; the average unlike Metacritic avoided opinionated weight systems for rankings, as it used a simple mean of every ranking from all the accredited websites reviewing that game.

When a game accumulated six total reviews, it was given a ranking compared to all other games in the database and a ranking compared to games on its console.

At the time of the site's closure in December 2019, seven games had an aggregate score of 97% or higher: Super Mario Galaxy, The Legend of Zelda: Ocarina of Time, Super Mario Odyssey, Super Mario Galaxy 2, The Legend of Zelda: Breath of the Wild, Grand Theft Auto IV, and Grand Theft Auto V.

== Discontinuation ==
GameRankings was shut down and redirected to Metacritic, another review aggregator, on December 9, 2019.
