= Bill Trinen =

American Nintendo executive

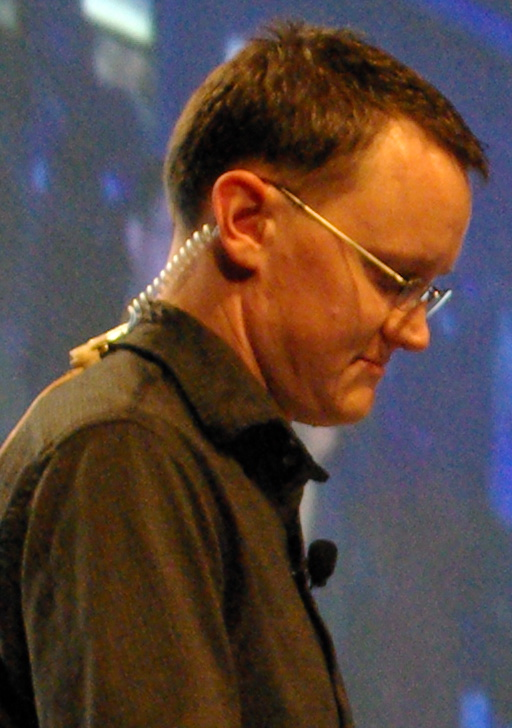
- Bill Trinen at the 2007 Game Developers Conference
- Born: August 21
- Education: Aoyama Gakuin University, University of Oregon
- Occupations: Vice President, Player & Product Experience

Bill Trinen (born August 21) is the Vice President, Player & Product Experience of Nintendo of America. He is also a professional Japanese-to-English translator who has worked on the localization of numerous Nintendo-published video games. He often acts as an interpreter for various Japanese developers, most notably video game designer Shigeru Miyamoto.

== Early life and education ==
Trinen was born on August 21. He began studying Japanese while in high school and continued at the University of Oregon, where he majored in Japanese and minored in Business. He also studied international business, international management, economics, and translation for a year overseas at the Aoyama Gakuin University in Tokyo, Japan, and lived in Shibuya.

== Career ==
Trinen began work with Nintendo translating bug reports on The Legend of Zelda: Ocarina of Time, and was then hired full-time for the Nintendo Treehouse, its game localization division. He described his responsibilities in the Treehouse as "helping explain to people at Nintendo what the cool new features of the games are and points to focus on in PR and marketing". Trinen's first translation project was Mario Party, a Nintendo 64 game first released in Japan in 1998 and in western regions in 1999. He became the interpreter for Shigeru Miyamoto six months into the job by request of former NOA software engineering manager Jim Merrick. Trinen has also presented in various North American Nintendo Direct presentations, appeared in numerous E3s and is a significant public figure of NOA's Nintendo Treehouse division.
