= Matt Casamassina =

American video game journalist

- Born: California, U.S.
- Occupations: Video game journalist; businessman; novelist
- Spouse: Edie Kissko

Matt Casamassina is a video game journalist, businessman, and novelist, and a founding editor of IGN. He quit working for IGN on April 23, 2010. In his time at the site, he was the author of many reviews and previews of games by video game developer and publisher Nintendo. He resides in Los Angeles, California, is married and has three children.

Casamassina started in 1997 as editor of the website N64.com, which soon became the Nintendo 64 section of the IGN site and whose domain name now redirects to Nintendo's official website.

Casamassina also appeared on the G4 television program Attack of the Show! as a guest star and as a character model in the Nintendo 64 game Perfect Dark. He, along with Craig Harris, Chadd Chambers, and Peer Schneider, has become one of the main characters in the IGN-published webcomic Cubetoons.

Casamassina independently published his first novel, Dead Weight, in 2016. In 2017, Casamassina founded Rogue Games Inc., which has developed and released games such as Fisti-fluffs, The Pocket Arcade, and Under: Depths of Fear.

== Work ==
=== Apple ===
On April 22, 2010, Casamassina announced on his blog that he would be leaving IGN to work for Apple, where he was the editorial manager of the iOS App Store.

=== Novels ===
Casamassina is the author of three novels: Dead Weight (2016), Sophistication (2018) and Degenerate (2025).
