= Go Tell It on the Mountain (film) =

- Based on: Go Tell It on the Mountain by James Baldwin
- Written by: Gus Edwards; James Baldwin; Leslie Lee
- Directed by: Stan Lathan
- Starring: Paul Winfield; Rosalind Cash; Giancarlo Esposito; Douglas Turner Ward; Ruby Dee
- Country of origin: United States
- Original language: English

Production
- Executive producers: Robert Geller; Lindsay Law
- Producer: Calvin Skaggs
- Editor: Jay Freund
- Running time: 96 minutes
- Production company: Learning in Focus

Original release
- Network: PBS
- Release: January 14, 1985

Go Tell It on the Mountain is a 1985 American made-for-television drama film directed by Stan Lathan, based on James Baldwin's 1953 novel of the same name. It stars Paul Winfield, Rosalind Cash, Ruby Dee, Alfre Woodard, Douglas Turner Ward, CCH Pounder, Kadeem Hardison, Giancarlo Esposito, and Ving Rhames in his first film role. The film was initially broadcast on the PBS television program American Playhouse on January 14, 1985.

== Plot ==
This film adaptation of James Baldwin's celebrated novel tells the journey of a family from the rural South to "big city" Harlem seeking both salvation and understanding and of a young boy struggling to earn the approval of a self-righteous and often unloving stepfather.

== Cast ==
- Paul Winfield as Gabriel Grimes
- Rosalind Cash as Aunt Florence
- Giancarlo Esposito as Elisha
- Douglas Turner Ward as Reverend James
- Ruby Dee as Mrs. Grimes
- Ving Rhames as Young Gabriel
- CCH Pounder as Deborah
- Alfre Woodard as Esther
- Kadeem Hardison as Royal
- James Bond III as John
- Olivia Cole as Elizabeth
