= Cynthia Bond =

American author and actress (born 1961)

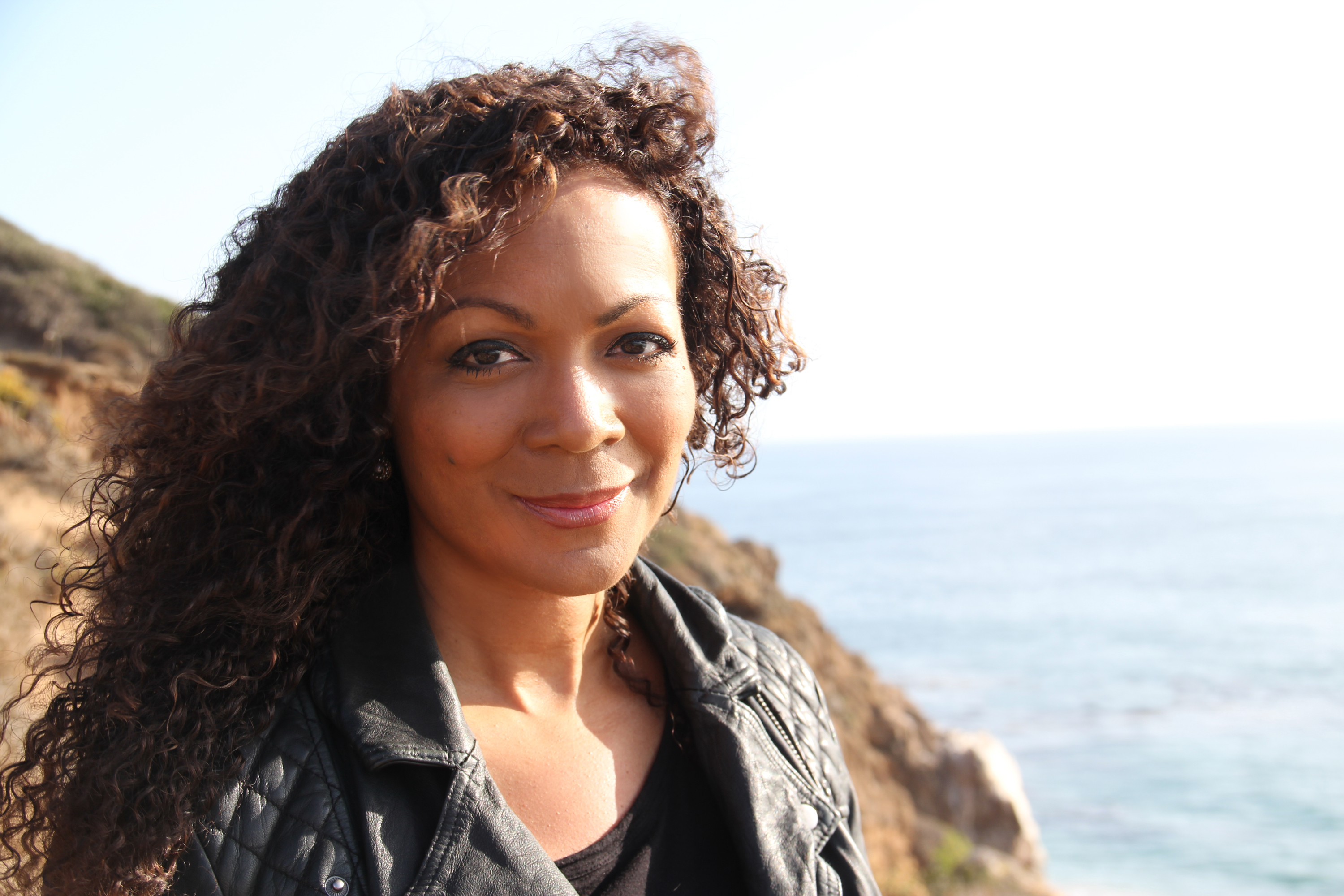
Bond in Malibu, California, near Paradigm Malibu where she is on staff as a Therapeutic Writing Teacher for at-risk youth

Cynthia Bond (born 24 April 1961) is an American author and actress. Her debut novel Ruby spent six consecutive weeks on the New York Times Bestseller list, and was chosen as a selection for Oprah's Book Club 2.0. She was born in Hempstead, Texas, and now lives in Los Angeles, California. Bond won a journalism scholarship to Northwestern University she then studied at the American Academy of Dramatic Arts in New York City. Bond was a PEN Rosenthal Fellow for Emerging Writers. Bond is also on staff at the Paradigm Malibu Adolescent Treatment Center.

== Early life ==
Cynthia Dale Bond was born in Hempstead, Waller County, Texas. Her parents are Zelma Marshall (née Harris) and Horace James Bond.

== Professional work ==
Bond founded The Blackbird Collective in 2011 to, according to their website, "create a nurturing, supportive environment for writers" with an emphasis on "telling truths seldom shared, and using creativity to help others." She taught writing to homeless and at-risk youth for over 15 years at the Los Angeles LGBT Center. Some of the youth she worked with inspired episodes of sexual violence described in her debut novel, Ruby. Bond was inspired by some of her own family's history in writing Ruby, including the story of her aunt who was killed by men rumored to be part of the Ku Klux Klan. She spent ten years working on the manuscript for Ruby. Bond's mother and her agent initially encouraged her to break the 900-page book into a trilogy. Bond initially believed it stood better as a single volume, then eventually agreed that a trilogy would be the best evolution for the novel.

Ruby was considered a "strong first novel" by Kirkus Reviews. Booklist called Ruby a "stark, unflinching portrait of dark deeds and dark psyches." Ruby is in part a "gritty story," but it also contains "mystical elements," according to Library Journal. People Magazine wrote that Ruby was not an "easy read," but it had an important and "compelling" message. Ann Friedman wrote in The Guardian that while the book has evoked comparisons with the work of Toni Morrison or Zora Neale Hurston, "It may be most apt to compare Bond to Gabriel García Márquez. Ruby is woven with magical realism....but Bond's luminous prose is grounded in a sure reality."

Ruby was shortlisted for the 2016 Bailey's Women's Prize for Fiction.

== Personal life ==
She currently lives in Los Angeles with her daughter. Bond is bisexual. She was once married to actor JB Blanc.

== Trivia ==
Bond played the lead antagonist in the 1990 horror film Def by Temptation. She is a cousin of the late civil rights activist Julian Bond.

== Works ==
- Ruby. New York: Hogarth, 2014. ISBN 978-0804188241
