= Batman: Arkham Origins Blackgate =

2013 video game

- Developer: Armature Studio
- Publisher: Warner Bros. Interactive Entertainment
- Director: Mark Pacini
- Producers: Rob Brown; Scott Green; Fannie Gunton
- Programmer: Jack Mathews
- Artist: Todd Keller
- Writer: Adam Beechen
- Composer: Christopher Drake
- Series: Batman: Arkham
- Engine: Bluepoint Engine
- Platforms: Nintendo 3DS; PlayStation Vita; PlayStation 3; Wii U; Windows; Xbox 360
- Release: October 25, 2013: Nintendo 3DS, PS Vita; WW: October 25, 2013; EU: November 8, 2013 (3DS) Deluxe Edition Wii U, PlayStation 3, Windows, Xbox 360; NA: April 1, 2014; EU: April 2, 2014
- Genres: Action-adventure, Metroidvania
- Mode: Single-player

Batman: Arkham Origins Blackgate is a 2013 action-adventure game developed by Armature Studio and published by Warner Bros. Interactive Entertainment. Based on the DC Comics superhero Batman, it is a companion game and sequel to Batman: Arkham Origins (2013), and part of the Batman: Arkham series. Set three months after Arkham Origins, the game follows Batman as he attempts to stop a prison riot at the Blackgate Penitentiary, which has been taken over by three of Gotham City's most notorious crime bosses: the Joker, the Penguin, and Black Mask. The story also depicts Batman's first encounter with Catwoman, who aids Batman throughout the game with ulterior motives.

The game was released on October 25, 2013, for the Nintendo 3DS and PlayStation Vita handheld game consoles, to coincide with Arkham Origins' release for home consoles and Microsoft Windows. The 3DS version was delayed to November 8, 2013, in Europe. In Japan, the game was released on December 5, 2013, the same date as Arkham Origins for home consoles, exclusively for the PlayStation Vita. A deluxe edition of the game was announced and released for Windows, the Wii U eShop, PlayStation Network, and Xbox Live Arcade on April 1, 2014, in North America and April 2, 2014, in Europe. It features new maps, enemy encounters, difficulty levels, batsuits, and enhanced visuals compared to the original.

Origins Blackgate received mixed reviews; it was praised for successfully transitioning the Arkham games to handheld consoles, but was criticized for its setting, navigation system, controls, inconsistent difficulty, and fixed 2.5D camera. A non-canon animated sequel, Batman: Assault on Arkham, was released in July 2014, while a direct video game continuation, Batman: Arkham Shadow, was released in October 2024 for the Meta Quest 3.

== Gameplay ==
Batman performing a glide kick on a group of enemies from a vantage point, one of the features incorporated from the previous Batman: Arkham games

Armature looked through the back log of the previous Arkham games to see what features would work for Origins Blackgate. The developer took many features from the main console games, such as grappling, gliding, crouching and climbing, and were able to implement them in the 2.5D space, while supplementing them with gadgets that include: the Batarang, a throwing weapon; the Batclaw, used for hooking on to surfaces; and Explosive Gel that can now be shot over a distance. As Batman cannot jump in the game, the grapnel gun is used to access higher points in the environment. The game does not feature an experience point system, with the entire game being item-based.

The free-flow combat system that is present in the other Arkham games has been built from the ground up. Batman still moves from left to right, but has the ability to be in the foreground or the background. Director Mark Pacini said that a few more layers were added to the predator/detective mode. Players are able to see the sightlines of the enemies, which immediately allows players to know whether Batman can be seen or not by enemies. When Batman is in detective mode, Batman changes color based on their proximity or based on how close he is to being seen. Vantage points, floor grates, silent takedowns, glide kicks, weapon use, and breakable walls return from the console games as well.

Origins Blackgate offers side missions which help the player to piece together the events that led to the explosion which caused the mass breakout. The level design allows the player to face the bosses of the game in any order, at any time. As such, the game features multiple endings, based on which boss the player faced last. The game also features different suits for Batman, each with their own attributes, that are made available based on the order the game is played.

== Synopsis ==
=== Characters ===
Origins Blackgate features most of the cast of Arkham Origins. The main character is Batman (Roger Craig Smith), a superhero trained to the peak of human physical perfection and an expert in martial arts. During the game, he must apprehend three criminals who have escaped from the Blackgate Penitentiary: the psychopathic Joker (Troy Baker), black-market weapons dealer the Penguin (Nolan North), and the sadistic, brutal crime lord Black Mask (Brian Bloom). Batman also has altercations with the seductive Catwoman (Grey DeLisle), expert-marksman Deadshot (Chris Cox), prison fights champion Bronze Tiger (Gary Anthony Sturgis), and the monstrous zombie Solomon Grundy (Fred Tatasciore). Other characters include GCPD captain James Gordon (Michael Gough), Blackgate warden Martin Joseph (Khary Payton), government official Amanda Waller (C. C. H. Pounder), and Captain Rick Flag. The supervillain Bane also makes a non-speaking appearance in the game.

=== Setting ===
Three months after the events of Arkham Origins, a mysterious explosion at Blackgate Prison allows the inmates to escape, resulting in a massive riot. The Joker, Penguin, and Black Mask manage to each gather enough henchmen in order to take over their own section of the prison. After being informed that Blackgate has been separated into three sections (the Cell Block, the Industrial Area, and the Administration Offices), Batman goes to investigate and defeat the three crime bosses, though he quickly learns that there is more to this than your average uprising. Batman also meets Catwoman and others for the first time, and begins to forge a partnership with a young Captain James Gordon.

=== Plot ===
While patrolling Gotham one night, Batman spots Catwoman stealing from a government building and gives chase. Several Department of Extranormal Operations agents mistake him for Catwoman's accomplice and try to capture both, but Batman avoids them and eventually defeats Catwoman, leaving her to be arrested. Two weeks later, Captain James Gordon contacts Batman for help on a prison riot at Blackgate, which was made possible by a mysterious explosion; the inmates have taken numerous hostages, and the prison has been divided into three main territories, each one held by the Joker, Penguin, and Black Mask. Upon entering the prison, Batman encounters Catwoman, who informs him of hostages held inside the maximum security area of the prison, known as the Arkham Wing. At this point, Batman may choose to go after any of the three crime bosses; before leaving, Catwoman also informs him that Joker has cut the air supply to the wing, leaving the hostages with minimal air.

On his way to Black Mask, Batman learns that the latter is attempting to overload Blackgate's power generators and cause a chain reaction that will kill his rivals. After defeating Solomon Grundy in the prison's sewers, Batman subdues Black Mask and thwarts his plan. On his way to the Penguin, Batman again encounters Catwoman, who informs him of a fighting contest hosted by the Penguin. Batman is forced to battle the Penguin's champion Bronze Tiger, who is also reluctant to fight. After defeating Bronze Tiger, the Penguin orders his men to kill Batman, but Bronze Tiger fights them off, allowing Batman to pursue and defeat the Penguin. On his way to the Joker, Batman encounters Warden Martin Joseph, whose office has been rigged with bombs. While attempting to free Joseph, Batman is attacked by Deadshot, who has been hired separately by all three crime bosses to kill him. After defeating Deadshot, Batman rescues Joseph, who reveals that the Joker is in his office. Batman defeats the Joker and acquires the codes needed to shut down the gas set to release on the hostages. Before leaving, however, he notices that the air supply was not cut as Catwoman had stated.

Once the Joker, Penguin, and Black Mask have all been dealt with, Batman is able to enter the Arkham Wing, only to find that there are no hostages, just a weakened Bane. Catwoman appears and reveals that she lied about the hostages so that Batman would help her reach Bane, whom she was hired to recover. Batman pursues Catwoman to the prison's docks and defeats her, but as he begins to interrogate her about her employer's identity, a SWAT team led by Rick Flag arrives to arrest Catwoman. As they leave with her, Batman flies off into the night, questioning the team's actions.

The ending of the game depends on which boss was defeated last. Black Mask is found by some guards and takes one of them hostage; another guard tries to shoot Black Mask, but misses and hits a pipeline, causing an explosion which forces Black Mask to make his escape while screaming in pain. The Penguin bribes a corrupt guard to release him from his cell, and as he leaves, he kills the guard for being rude to him in the past. The Joker is found by several Blackgate guards, whom he presumably kills before taking one of their uniforms to escape.

Throughout the game, Amanda Waller and Rick Flag are seen monitoring the events of the breakout. In a post-credits scene, it is revealed that Waller was the one who hired Catwoman to break Bane out of Blackgate. Per Waller's orders, Catwoman was released, but she did not complete her mission, and Flag's team was forced to return Bane to police custody. Despite this, the operation was not a complete failure, as the team managed to pick up Deadshot and Bronze Tiger during the riot, whom Waller intends to recruit into her squad. As Waller's helicopter flies away from Blackgate, one of Batman's trackers is seen on its underbelly.

== Development ==
The game was first revealed on the cover of the May 2013 issue of Game Informer magazine, revealed on April 9, 2013. Director Mark Pacini revealed that the game had been in development since early 2012. Many of the production team came over from Retro Studios, which developed the Metroid Prime series. Origins Blackgate has a similar feel and construction to those games. None of the console-game technology was used for the game, with everything being done by Armature from scratch. The game uses a checkpoint system to save progress. All of the 2D animations were done in house at Armature and are fully voiced. While set after the events of Arkham Origins, Armature Studio worked closely with WB Games Montréal to allow the games to be played in any order and not spoil any of the material from either game. The story of Origins Blackgate was written by Adam Beechen.

Armature's technical director, Jack Mathews, has stated that neither of the two versions is a port of the other, with the graphics as the only difference between the two platforms. Matthews further stated that Armature has custom tools to help generate ideally sized models and textures for each platform from a common source, and that the 3DS version would run at 30fps in 3D.

=== Design ===
Cutscenes look like hand-drawn comics, while voice acting is included. The game adds dynamic camera angles to help give a better sense of scope in the 2D plane. For example, the camera can zoom in over Batman's shoulder as he is on a zipline or swoop up to a top-down vantage point when on a gargoyle for an inverted takedown. By linking the game to Arkham Origins on the PlayStation 3, a skin based on Beware the Batman becomes available. Batman’s suits in the game include his appearances in Beware the Batman, Batman: Zero Year, Blackest Knight, Superman: Red Son, The 1960s TV series, DC One Million, Thrillkiller, and New 52.

== Reception ==
Reception

Aggregate score
Aggregator	Score
Metacritic	3DS: 68/100; VITA: 61/100; PC: 60/100; PS3: 60/100; X360: 62/100

Review scores
Publication	Score
Destructoid	3/10
Game Informer	6/10
GameRevolution	2.5/5
GameSpot	5/10
IGN	7.4/10
Polygon	8/10

Following its release, Batman: Arkham Origins Blackgate received generally mixed reviews. Aggregating review website Metacritic gave the 3DS version a 68/100 and the Vita a 61/100.

Reviewers were polarized over the transition of the home console game to portable devices. Polygon and IGN said that Arkham Origins Blackgate successfully distilled the gameplay mechanics of Arkham Origins. However, others said that the game came across as sloppy and unfinished while doing nothing to advance the series or its characters.

Reception of the game's prison setting was generally negative. Reviewers criticized the level designs as repetitive, dark, and sparse outside of areas decorated by the Joker, and several critics noted a difficulty in navigating the facility due to poorly highlighted avenues of travel such as destructible walls that can not be viewed at all outside of the game's scanning mode. Game Informer noted that even when an interactive element is obvious, it cannot be used until the player spends several seconds highlighting and scanning it, a process they found inconvenient. Conversely, Polygon said the game world featured impressive and expansive levels, and appreciated the various unlockable avenues of exploration hiding secret items. Several reviewers were critical of necessary backtracking through previously explored areas, calling them boring and citing a lack of regenerating enemies as a problem, leaving cleared areas permanently empty. GameSpot took issue with the difficulty of navigating some areas due to the game's 2.5D viewpoint that involves the player normally moving left or right, but periodically entering vents or doors in the background of levels, creating constantly shifting perspectives. Navigating the levels was noted as a point of difficulty, with the in-game map failing to clearly define the player's location, sometimes making it appear that Batman is in a room he needs to be, when he is in fact multiple levels above or below it.

The series' familiar combat was considered to have been effectively streamlined while retaining the console versions fluid, simple and satisfying movement with effective striking and countering. Some reviewers considered the transition to be less successful, lacking the same intensity and making enemies easier to defeat, preventing the same kinetic bouncing between enemies of the console games. Controlling Batman during combat was noted to be less precise and responsive, and the 2.5D perspective would see Batman often target the closest, rather than intended, enemy across multiple planes, preventing effective combat strategies as more varied enemies begin to appear.

Polygon said that the boss fights were imaginative, while Game Informer said they were the best part of Arkham Origins Blackgate, utilizing specific traits of each villain in their attacks, and strategies for defeating them. IGN noted the novelty of the game featuring bosses that had not appeared in the other Arkham games, but considered the fights to be simplified and heavily reliant on button prompts. However, reviewers also found the fights frustrating, poorly explained, and punitive, featuring attacks that can instantly kill Batman, requiring lengthy loading times to place the player at an earlier point in the game, then requiring some backtracking before the fight can again be attempted.
