= The Color of Friendship (ABC Afterschool Special) =

- ABC Afterschool Special episode
- Episode no.: Season 10; Episode 4
- Original air date: November 11, 1981

Guest appearances
- Chris Barnes; Katharine Houghton; James Bond III

"The Color of Friendship" is a 1981 episode of the American television anthology series ABC Afterschool Special. It is about the friendship between two 13-year-old boys, one black and one white, in a small town that has just started integrating its schools.

== Plot ==
David Bellinger is a middle-class white teenager living in the fictitious city of Marston. Joel Garth is a poor black teenager from the infamous "center" of the city, a depressed, crime-ridden area. David's school is targeted for integration by busing students from "the center" to David's more affluent neighborhood.

== Cast ==
- Chris Barnes - David Bellinger
- Katharine Houghton - Miss James
- James Bond III - Joel Garth

== Awards ==
Won Best Children's Special or Episode in a Series award in 1982.
