= ReCore =

2016 video game

- ReCore key art, showing protagonist Joule (center right) flanked by Mack (center left) and other friendly corebots
- Developers: Armature Studio; Comcept (Note: Additional work by Asobo Studio. Definitive Edition developed by Armature Studio.)
- Publisher: Microsoft Studios
- Director: Mark Pacini
- Producers: Keiji Inafune; Fannie Gunton
- Designers: Eric Weiss; Berenger Fish; Masahiro Yasuma
- Programmer: Jack Mathews
- Artists: Todd Keller; Shinsuke Komaki
- Writer: Joseph Staten
- Composer: Chad Seiter
- Engine: Unity
- Platforms: Windows; Xbox One
- Release: NA: September 13, 2016; AU: September 13, 2016; JP: September 15, 2016; EU: September 16, 2016; Definitive Edition: WW: August 29, 2017
- Genres: Action-adventure, platform
- Mode: Single-player

ReCore (Note: Stylized as recore (Japanese: リコア, Hepburn: Rikoa)) is a 2016 action-adventure and platform game developed by Armature Studio and Comcept and published by Microsoft Studios. The story tracks Joule Adams, one of the first volunteers for the utopian colony of Far Eden, who wakes after centuries in cryo-sleep to find that nothing has gone according to plan. With her three robotic machines known as corebot companions, Joule ventures throughout Far Eden to uncover the secrets behind the failed mission.

The open world of Far Eden is subject to exploration and the collection of resources. Joule's weapons are color-coded to inflict damage on a particular set of enemies and, like her companions, can also be enhanced. The corebots support her in battle and puzzle solving. The game uses a third-person perspective, and incorporates action role-playing and Metroidvania key elements in its design, progression and systems.

Development began in early 2014. The game was directed by Metroid Prime trilogy game director Mark Pacini, (Note: Pacini is credit as project lead & lead designer in Metroid Prime, and game director in it sequels, Metroid Prime 2: Echoes and Metroid Prime 3: Corruption.) written by Joseph Staten and conceptualized by Keiji Inafune. The Legend of Zelda, Mega Man and Metroid series were significant influences in its creation. The development was divided between Armature Studio and Comcept into their own distinctive proficiencies, with Armature taking the main primarily role, while Comcept helped with story and world-building. Asobo Studio assisted the development, supporting both studios. The game was released for Windows and Xbox One worldwide in September 2016, making it the first Xbox Play Anywhere program title.

ReCore received polarised reviews from critics, who commended its innovative genre-combined concept and praised its visuals, atmospheric setting, characterization, audio design, platforming and controls. Its narrative, looting mechanics, open-world, mission design and combat received more divided opinions; Several critics noted technical issues regarding lengthy and unsuccessful loading screens at launch, prompting Microsoft to release several patches. A Definitive Edition version developed by Armature Studio and published by Microsoft Studios was released as a free downloadable update on August 29, 2017. This version was met with generally positive reception by critics due to technical fixes, improved loading times, changes to gameplay and additional content.

== Gameplay ==
Player character using ammunition matching the color of the opposing force

ReCore is an action-adventure and platform game played from a third-person perspective. It centers around Joule Adams and her three robotic machines known as corebot companions, who aid her in combat and puzzle solving; these types of machines can be improved, should players find the blueprints and materials to do so, which grants upgrades to their attack and defense. The machines' cores can be swapped between them, changing their abilities in succession, and their frames are rearrangeable. Players can level up Joule's weapons and vitality. Ranged weapons have three kinds of ammunition that take down an enemy with a matching color: red, blue and yellow. Furthermore, if one of Joule's corebots matches the color of an enemy, it will thus inflict more damage in combat. Joule also wields a grappling hook that she uses to extract her enemies' energy cores after a certain amount of damage is done. Joule must dodge, jump or dash quickly to avoid taking damage.

Joule navigates the open world of Far Eden either on foot equipped with rocket boosters on her shoes and her back, across platforms with the grappling hook or via fast travel. The scenery may be altered by sandstorms, unveiling new areas to explore. Corebots can speak their own language called DigiMode, which the players are permitted to translate. Dungeons leading to progression in the story and containing resources that can be used for crafting are scattered throughout the world for Joule to unlock by way of collecting cores.

== Plot ==
ReCore is set roughly 200 years in the future. In the course of the early 2020s, a disease called the "Dust Devil Plague" began to ravage the Earth. An organization named Mandate led global efforts to fight the disease. As the Earth became uninhabitable, Mandate launched several missions to a new planet known as Far Eden. Far Eden was discovered many light-years away in the first decades of the 21st century. Several thousand corebots were sent to build atmospheric processing facilities on Far Eden, and the first group of colonists was sent. The colonists were to hibernate in cryo-sleep for 200 years while the terraforming process finished. During this period, many of the colonists vanished, and the corebots became corrupted.

The game begins on the desert world of Far Eden as one of the colonists Joule Adams (Erika Soto) and her corebot Mack (Jonathan Lipow) are walking past the wreckage of her cryo-sleep maintenance habitat, or "crawler", from which she previously woke. They venture out to obtain a power core to get the crawler back online. Eventually finding it inside a corebot, Joule pries it out with her extractor tool. Joule and Mack then return to the crawler, switching its power back on. Joule sets out to reactivate a terraforming pylon that she learns has been offline for ninety-six years. After Joule manages to reboot the pylon, she receives a distress signal from a beacon that had until then been obstructed. Once she obtains a prismatic core in order to progress towards the signal, enemy corebots appear. On the order of Victor (Alex Fernandez), the leader of the corebots, they demand that she hand over the core. When she refuses, they become agitated. She defeats the enemies and proceeds to her destination. There, she encounters amputee Kai Brehn (Harry Shum) and his corebot Seth. Kai requests aid for his leg and Joule complies. She reveals the prismatic core, as it might assist him. Kai urges her to travel to the core foundry so that Joule may discover the answers to its potential. Seth accompanies her.

In the foundry, Joule is able to analyze the prismatic core. She can make out voices coming from the core – including her father's – thus deducing that it is a transmission of sorts. Heading to Eden Tower to decrypt the core's transmission, she agrees to meet Kai there. Once reunited, they are ambushed by Victor. Kai stays behind to provide Joule the time to escape. She finds a lost crawler filled with parietal art indicating that Victor had manipulated the other corebots to attack the maintenance habitats. Corebot Duncan enters, lamenting the death of his human companion, and unites with Joule against Victor. Joule approaches Eden Tower to activate it, only to be faced with Victor and his minions. She learns that the ships, once orbiting Far Eden while waiting for its terraforming to complete, are long gone, having been destroyed by Victor. He throws Kai's prosthetic leg to the ground, proclaiming him dead. Finally, Joule bests Victor in combat and activates the terraforming system, materializing a hologram of her father from parts of memories hidden in the cores. In the end, it becomes clear that Kai survived his confrontation with Victor.

== Development ==
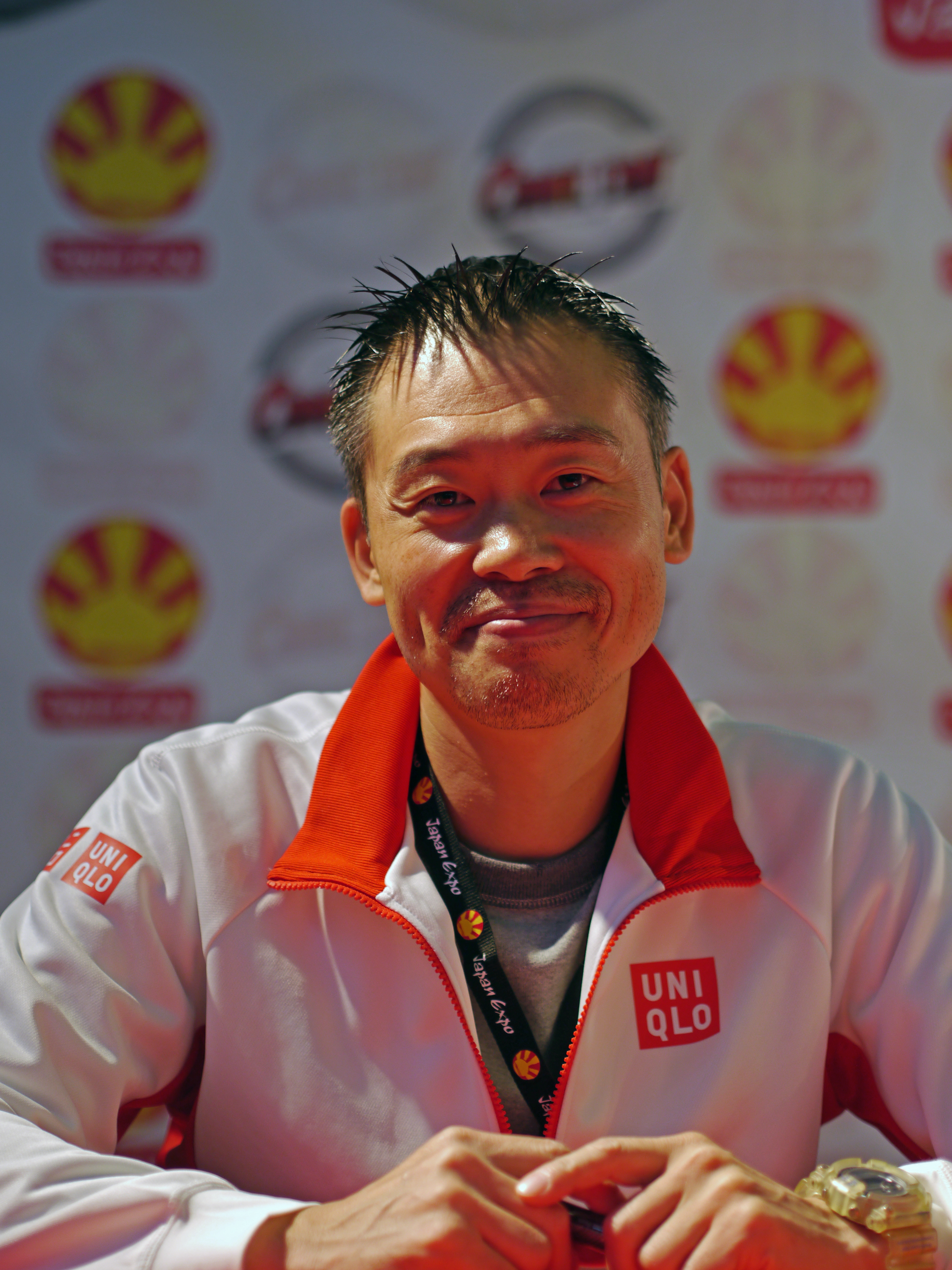
Executive producer Keiji Inafune came up with ReCore's original concept.

Development started in early 2014 and took 14 months to go into full production. The concept was contributed by Keiji Inafune, who wished to convey the idea of surviving in a world verging on human extinction. The developers first came up with the robots, whose anatomical design problems would later be solved by the insertion of cores – essentially robot souls – to explain their propulsion. Writer Joseph Staten resolved to create a simple story to enhance an emotional backdrop more grounded in complexity. ReCore was designed by Comcept, which is a development studio founded by former Capcom employee Keiji Inafune. Partnering with Comcept was Armature Studio, formed by leaders from Retro Studios who worked on Metroid Prime, Metroid Prime 2: Echoes, Metroid Prime 3: Corruption, and the prior Mega Man X series spin-off concept Maverick Hunter. Dividing labor between the studios into each their expertise, Armature Studio developed the technical assets while Comcept maintained the base philosophy of the world, characters and story. Using the Unity game engine, Armature Studio collaborated with Unity Technologies to advance its animation state machine system, Mecanim, for its application in ReCore. Asobo Studio assisted in a share of the development including creating the game's world and enemies. The game was directed by Mark Pacini of the Metroid Prime trilogy series. Mega Man and Metroid influenced the manner in which the robotic characters and world-unlocking were developed, and the cinematic story was impacted by Staten's reading of The Jungle Book. The Legend of Zelda was also subject of inspiration. Chad Seiter composed the score.

== Release ==
ReCore was first revealed at E3 2015 during Microsoft's opening press conference. At the conclusion of the debut trailer, Microsoft revealed the game was to be released in the second quarter of 2016 on the Xbox One. On January 4, 2016, Microsoft announced that ReCore would also be released for Windows. ReCore was released as the first title of Xbox's Play Anywhere program – the opportunity to play the game on both Windows and Xbox One, no matter the platform for which it was initially purchased – on September 13, 2016, in North America and Australia, September 15 in Japan and September 16 in Europe. After the loading screens were criticized, a patch was made to assuage their long duration on the Xbox One. An artbook, The Art of ReCore, was published on September 27, 2016, by Dark Horse Comics. A free trial version lasting 30 minutes was released the following month in concurrence with an update launched to polish the audio, performance, waypoints, achievement tracking, collision locations, checkpoints and respawn points. ReCore: Definitive Edition was released on August 29, 2017, adding story content, areas to explore, and gameplay changes and repairs.

== Reception ==
Reception

Aggregate score
Aggregator	Score
Metacritic	PC: 58/100; XONE: 63/100

Review scores
Publication	Score
4Players	7/10
The A.V. Club	7/10
Destructoid	4/10
Easy Allies	3/5
Edge	6/10
Eurogamer	3/5
Famitsu	30/40
GameRevolution	3/5
GameSpot	6/10
GamesRadar+	2/5
Hardcore Gamer	3/5
IGN	7.3/10
M! Games	7.5/10
Polygon	6.5/10
Player One	4/5
USgamer	3/5
VentureBeat	7/10
Windows Central	4/5

ReCore received "mixed or average" reviews, according to review aggregator Metacritic. The game was the fifth best-selling retail video game in the UK in its week of release, according to Chart-Track. It was nominated for the 2016 Unity Awards in the category of Best 3D Visuals and for Xbox Game of the Year at the 2016 Golden Joystick Awards. Brett Makedonski of Destructoid had a mixed response to ReCore. Though describing the game to be "brimming with ideas", Makedonski criticized the design for being injurious to its foundation. He felt the fetch quests were repetitive and over represented as part of the gameplay experience, and that it failed to do justice to the narrative. Makedonski praised the game's controls, but had issues with the combat for its tedious nature and inability to advance. Keri Honea of Game Revolution showed little enthusiasm for the game, considering the dungeon raids "formulaic", boring and repetitive. The unlockable "Arena Dungeons" were declared unintelligible in the context of the game's established world. In addition to combat abilities being recounted as "pointless and padded", loading times – lasting up to 4 minutes – also met charges of criticism. Honea concluded that the "first couple of hours of ReCore were almost downright magical" but grew disenchanted with everything but the story, which was seen as its only redeeming quality. Tamoor Hussain of GameSpot called it a modest action game whose length suffered a condition of insecurity, yet added that most of its ventures were carried out successfully. Hussain found the combat "quite pleasing" despite its simplicity, in particular the extraction of cores, which he likened to reeling in a fish. Though marred by an apparent lack of visual diversity, the world appeared conversely evocative according to Hussain. Also subject to complaint were lengthy and unsuccessful loading screens, and the rate at which it crashed on the Xbox One.

Sam Prell of GamesRadar wrote that ReCore signified good ideas, when poorly executed. Prell explains that, for all the game's positive aspects, they were outweighed by some considerable problems. He cited its extensive loading times as one of the most frequent offenders, which would also cause the game to crash. Other technical issues included bugs and frame rates that would scale down dramatically. The main story was nevertheless appreciated, even though it had a slight running time and, as concluded by Prell, resulted in a "padded" experience. Arthur Gies of Polygon took the view that, however strong a first impression the fundamentals and ideas yielded, the game's overall quality was reduced by being drawn out beyond its capabilities with superfluous material. A more favorable aspect was the combo system, which was said to channel "early '00s Japanese action games in a way that feels hard to resist". Traversal challenges and controls were also lauded. Further, Polygon disparaged the design for the game's considerable length, and sensed it was to compensate for the small number of story missions. The loot and crafting system appeared minimal in action and the grinding involved was found to be "annoying" and "a real chore". Mike Williams of USgamer endorsed the combat and platforming's reminiscence to Mega Man Legends and Metroid Prime, respectively. Williams wrote that the corebots were one of ReCore's strongest aspects and judged exploration to be the most robust feature, but found that the story was obstructed by the level-based progression.

The release of the Definitive Edition update was met with a more positive reception due to technical fixes, improved loading times, changes to gameplay and additional content. Makedonski was favorable to the update, noting gameplay improvements that altered the pacing to lessen repetition, overall calling the update "what ReCore should've been in the first place."

== Future ==
=== Possible sequel ===
Prior to its announcement at E3, Inafune and Pacini already had discussed and planned a concept for a sequel, stating that the game would open up a 'bigger picture' to explore in future iterations. Xbox CEO Phil Spencer referred ReCore multiple times as the start of a new flagship franchise to Xbox One. Microsoft initially hoped explore ReCore traditions to tell new stories in the universe and its unique idea would lead to a successful property that bring back players interest in the action-adventure merged platform games, possibly spawning a new revival of the genre. Some ideas by Staten included expand the narrative and myths behind the world of Far Eden and explore a way to push the boundaries of what's possible in cinematic storytelling and gameplay mechanics who puts ReCore's lore in the same vein as his past works in the Halo and Destiny franchises. He also addressed that his team at Microsoft Studios Publishing planned to make sequels if the first game succeed and players were interested enough.

Alongside Quantum Break, ReCore was referred internally as a "risked groundbreaking idea" by Microsoft, and an attempt in the keep-pursuing desire of building a big, brand new franchise. During Gamescom 2016 in August, after being questioned about a potential sequel, Staten said that "like Halo: Combat Evolved was developed without knowledge about its future and possible sequels", they're building ReCore to a wise-bigger audience, bringing their best people to ensure a high-quality experience and "earn" the greenlit to develop a sequel. Shortly after the Definitive Edition release, Microsoft Studios general manager Shannon Loftis claimed that the updated version is a key-front in Xbox constant focus to deliver new content for the community, and reinforced Microsoft commitment for ReCore.

On June 23, 2018, Armature Studio confirmed to be working on two new original projects, answering a e-mail fan question about ReCore 2. The projects became Sports Scramble and Where the Heart Leads. Later on, the studio admitted that would be great to see ReCore 2 either by them or by another studio, and informed to have a good partnership with Microsoft, but they never discussed about a potential sequel. Following fifth anniversary celebrations of the original game, Keller told in May 2021 that if the right opportunity came in, Armature would be very interested in develop ReCore 2. On October 12, 2022, Meta Platforms acquired Armature Studio for a non-disclosured value, making them a Oculus Studios first-party developer for the virtual reality Meta Quest headsets, leaving ReCore's future uncertain. On February 21, 2023, after nearly five years inactive, the official Instagram page of the game was updated with a new post, sharing an image and quote "Anyone know what I'm up to with this cryptic code?".
