= Def by Temptation =

1990 American horror film by James Bond III

- Theatrical release poster
- Directed by: James Bond III
- Written by: James Bond III
- Produced by: James Bond III
- Starring: James Bond III; Kadeem Hardison; Bill Nunn; Samuel L. Jackson; Minnie Gentry; Rony Clanton; John Canada Terrell; Cynthia Bond
- Cinematography: Ernest R. Dickerson
- Edited by: Brian O'Hara; Li-Shin Yu
- Music by: Paul Laurence
- Production companies: Bonded Filmworks; Orpheus Pictures
- Distributed by: Troma Entertainment
- Release date: May 11, 1990
- Running time: 94 minutes
- Country: United States
- Language: English
- Budget: $5 million
- Box office: $2.2 million

Def by Temptation is a 1990 American black horror film written, produced, and directed by James Bond III, who also stars in the film alongside Cynthia Bond, Kadeem Hardison, Samuel L. Jackson, and Bill Nunn. Set in New York City, the film's plot follows a succubus (Bond) who preys on Black men, drawing the attention of a minister-in-training named Joel (Bond III), Joel's childhood friend K (Hardison), and a police officer (Nunn).

== Plot ==
Joel, a minister like his deceased father, was raised by his religious grandmother after both of his parents were killed in a car accident. Joel's childhood best friend, K, abandoned his religious upbringing and moved to New York City to become an actor.

Joel becomes disillusioned with Christianity and decides to take a trip to New York to visit K. While awaiting Joel's arrival, K visits a bar and meets an attractive woman, who is known by the bar patrons and bartenders as an unusual "Temptress" who brings a lot of men home with her, but unbeknownst to them, she kills the men after they engage in sex. K and the Temptress spend most of the night together at the bar. K, who refuses to go home with the Temptress, returns home in time to help Joel get settled in, saving his life. K catches up with Joel, telling him about the Temptress.

The Temptress' first victim is a womanizing bartender who sleeps with and disrespects women. Her second victim is a married man named Norman, whom she has given AIDS and back slashes to. Norman's wife later finds out he had gotten AIDS from sleeping with another woman, then she shoots and kills him for cheating and transferring AIDS onto her. Her third victim is a gay man named Jonathan. K's friend Dougy, a police officer who deals in supernatural cases, notices the men's disappearances after they leave with the Temptress.

The next night, Joel and K go to the bar. While K goes to the bathroom, Joel meets the Temptress, who pretends not to have met K before, leaving K confused and suspicious. Dougy tells K the woman gives him "strange vibes".

The next morning, Joel prepares to go out on a date with the Temptress, who arrives at the house, still pretending she does not know K. K, frustrated over having his feelings manipulated, calls her out over the pretense until he notices she doesn't have a reflection in the mirror. The Temptress then grows hostile towards K. Joel and the Temptress leave, leaving K scared and certain of what he has seen.

At the bar, K tells Dougy about his suspicions. Dougy tells K he believes his suspicions about the Temptress. They review past cases Dougy has worked on, showing K the men who leave with the Temptress are never seen again. K and Dougy go and see Madam Sonya, a fortune teller who reveals the woman is a succubus who murders men who are unfaithful and tempted by her. The Temptress then possesses Sonya, and threatens K and Dougy.

K decides to tell Joel about his earlier meeting with the Temptress at the bar, and that she is not who she says she is. Joel refuses to believe the accusations and K tells Joel to go home for his safety. K then calls Joel's grandmother and informs her of the situations that have occurred and asks her to come to New York to save Joel.

Meanwhile, K and Dougy go to the bar, where the Temptress is, and tell the bartender to put blessed holy water in her drink and then to get away fast. The Temptress has a reaction to the drink. K and Dougy run out of the bar, noticing K's car is gone, and split up. Dougy is chased by a car, then gets into the backseat of another car, which is driven by the bartender, who has been turned into a demon. Dougy is attacked by another demon in the backseat.

Meanwhile, at his house, K is violently sucked into his television. Blood and viscera explode from the screen, leaving K stuck and screaming inside the television.

Joel visits the Temptress' house, where she drugs him. Joel dreams about his father walking into his bedroom and seeing the Temptress naked in his bed. Joel, knowing his father is dead, wakes up as his grandmother enters the room to be attacked by the demon. Joel grabs a cross and rebukes the succubus, killing her. Joel and his grandma then hug, happy to have survived the attack.

Later, Dougy arrives at the bar in a limo driven by K. He takes a seat inside, where a woman lights his cigarette. Quoting an earlier suggestion from the Temptress, it’s revealed that he has transformed into an incubus along with K.

== Cast ==
- James Bond III as Joel Garth
  - Z. Wright as young Joel
- Kadeem Hardison as K
- Samuel L. Jackson as Minister Garth
- Bill Nunn as Dougy
- Cynthia Bond as Temptation
- John Canada Terrell as Bartender # 1 (first victim)
- Minnie Gentry as Grandma
- Melba Moore as Madam Sonya
- Najee as himself
- Freddie Jackson as himself
- Steven Van Cleef as Jonathan
- Sundra Jean Williams as Mrs. Garth
- Michael Michele (film debut) as Lady #6

== Production ==
James Bond III directed Def by Temptation, his debut feature film, in four weeks with a $5 million budget. Unlike other low-budget films distributed by Troma Inc., the film employed actors who were members of the Screen Actors Guild. Troma initially aimed to release the film during Black History Month in February 1990 to coincide with the release of the film's soundtrack album. Instead, the film premiered on April 27, 1990, at the American Film Institute Los Angeles International Film Festival, before opening in theaters that May.

The film's credits include a dedication to James Bond Sr. and James Bond Jr., the grandfather and father of Bond III, who died in 1982 and 1979, respectively.

== Music ==
An official soundtrack was released in 1990 by Orpheus Records.

No.	Title	Writer(s)	Length
1.	"All Over You" (performed by Freddie Jackson)	Michael Day; Rocky Maffit; Thom Bishop	4:49
2.	"Hungry for Me Again" (performed by Ashford & Simpson)	Nickolas Ashford; Valerie Simpson	6:34
3.	"In a Sexy Mood" (performed by Eric Gable)	Jerry Cohen; John Whitehead; Larry Gold	4:55
4.	"What Makes You Feel That About Me?" (performed by Wayne Cockerham)	Arthur Zamora; Eric Strickland; Michael Carpenter	3:53
5.	"Sex and the Single Man" (performed by Slick Love)	James Bond III; Mark Plaza	4:20
6.	"Face to Face" (performed by Melba Moore)	Bruce Purse; Janice Dempsey	4:34
7.	"Fool" (performed by Paul Laurence)	Darryl Dash; James McKinney; Dempsey; Louis Humphrey	4:03
8.	"In and Out" (performed by Jeral Vickers)	Marc London	3:39
9.	"On a Mission" (performed by Dasez Tempo)	Bond III; Jerome Scott; Richard Draen	3:41
10.	"Do You Really Want to Rock?" (performed by Frankie B.)	Frank Burnett; Darryl Dash; Humphrey; Scott	5:26
11.	"New Love" (performed by Keith Robinson)	William A. Rhinehart	4:33
12.	"Temptation" (performed by Najee)	Jerome Najee Rasheed; Fareed Abdul Haqq	2:16
Total length:			52:43

== Release ==
Def by Temptation was theatrically released on May 11, 1990, and earned $54,582 in eleven venues. At the end of its run, the film grossed $2,218,579.

== Reception ==
On the review aggregator website Rotten Tomatoes, 75% of 16 critics' reviews are positive, with an average rating of 4.5/10. Washington Post reviewer Richard Harrington praised the film, writing it contained "some familiar conventions, but Bond brings to "Def" depth and emotional detail generally absent from such films." Writing for the New York Times, Janet Maslin described the film as "remarkably tame" for a Troma Entertainment production and praised the performances of the cast, but criticized the special effects, stating "[Bond's] film is more memorable for its sheer ambition and occasional flashy style than for its execution."
