= Joseph Staten =

American writer

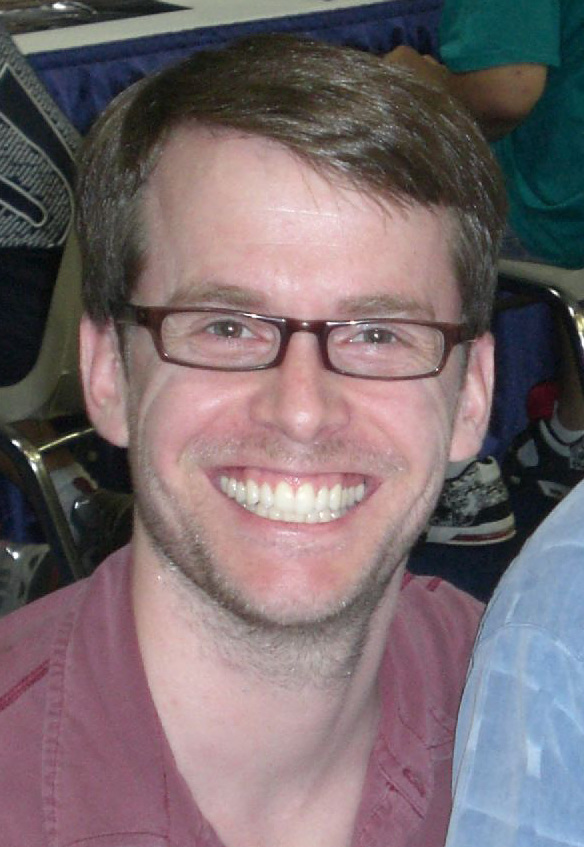
- Staten at the 2007 Comic-Con International
- Education: Northwestern University (BS); University of Chicago (MA)
- Occupations: Writer, cinematic director

Joseph Staten is an American writer best known for his work at video game studios Bungie, Microsoft Studios, and 343 Industries.

At Bungie, Staten served as director of cinematics for the studio's games, including the Halo series; he would write mission scripts and movie dialogue for the titles. He has also been involved in managing the expansion of the Halo franchise to other game studios and producers, including Peter Jackson's Wingnut Interactive. Though not a published author previously, Tor Books approached Staten to write the fifth novel in the Halo franchise, Halo: Contact Harvest. Released in 2007, the novel reached #3 on The New York Times bestseller list in the first week of its release and received positive reviews. Staten rejoined Microsoft Studios as a member of the Microsoft Publishing team. Helping with the publishing of titles like ReCore and Microsoft Flight Simulator. In 2018 he joined 343 industries as the creative director on Halo Infinite, and left the company in 2023 to become a creative director at Netflix. In October 2024, he and the rest of the employees of Netflix's southern California gaming studio were let go.

== Early life and education ==
Joseph Staten was born in San Francisco in 1971. He is the son of a minister who is a professor of theology and philosophy of religion. He entered Northwestern University in 1990 with the aspiration of becoming a professional actor. Realizing he was not leading man material, he switched his focus to other subjects and graduated with a Bachelor of Science degree in communication and international studies in 1994. Staten also has studied at the University of Chicago, where he received a Master of Arts degree in international relations in 1997.

After being rejected for employment with the Central Intelligence Agency, Staten dropped the idea of entering the foreign service and instead helped his family at their winery in Sonoma Valley. He pursued a number of jobs before becoming a staff member at game development studio Bungie in 1998 after meeting some of the developers in online Myth matches.

== Career ==
=== Bungie ===
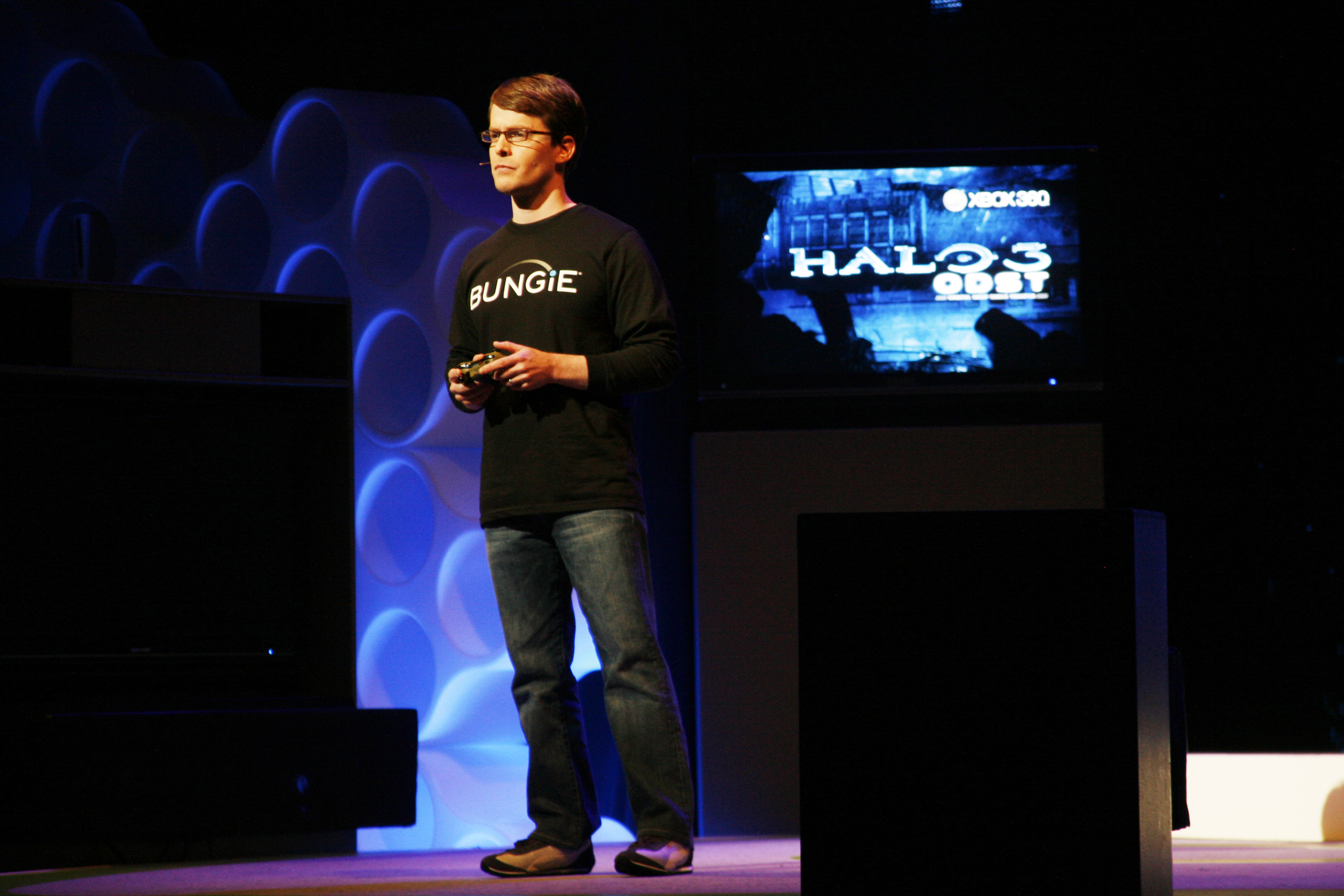
Staten presents Halo 3: ODST during Microsoft’s Xbox 360 media briefing at E3 2009.

Staten's former role at Bungie was director of cinematics and was responsible for the in-game movies for Bungie's Halo: Combat Evolved, Halo 2, and Halo 3. Work on the games at "crunch time" involved 80-hour weeks and stretches without sleep maxing out at 72 hours. Staten worked alongside three other staff writers at Bungie, each with their own separate role: Frank O'Connor developed Halo 3's combat dialogue, Rob McLees focused on Halo canon and working with licensing partners, and Staten developed the cinematics and missions scripts. Staten said in an interview that he considered it challenging to write for the games, as "first person shooters [are] all about writing 'between the bullets'"—relating plot information to the players in between action sequences. "You need to be efficient and clever to give players the story—the context—they need. But you don't want to push too hard or they'll reject it." During his work on the games he read science fiction works by Iain Banks, Robert A. Heinlein, and Vernor Vinge. In addition to his writing contributions, Staten lends his voice to small aliens known as Grunts in all three video games.

Though previous Halo novels had been written by professional writers like Eric Nylund and William C. Dietz, publisher Tor Books chose Staten to write the fifth Halo novelization, Halo: Contact Harvest. Editor Eric Raab noted in the book's press release that "who better to tell the tale" of humanity's encounter with the antagonistic alien Covenant than Staten, who had "intimate knowledge" of the series' story. The novel is an ensemble piece, with the action being narrated from both human and alien viewpoints; the work of Staten's favorite science-fiction authors helped teach him the importance of honing a "strong, consistent voice". Staten found that writing compelling action involved slowing things down, paradoxically the opposite of the fast-paced gameplay of a Halo title. He considered the book the perfect way to elaborate on the Halo story without stripping it down for a video game, and flesh out the character of Avery Johnson more than the games had allowed.

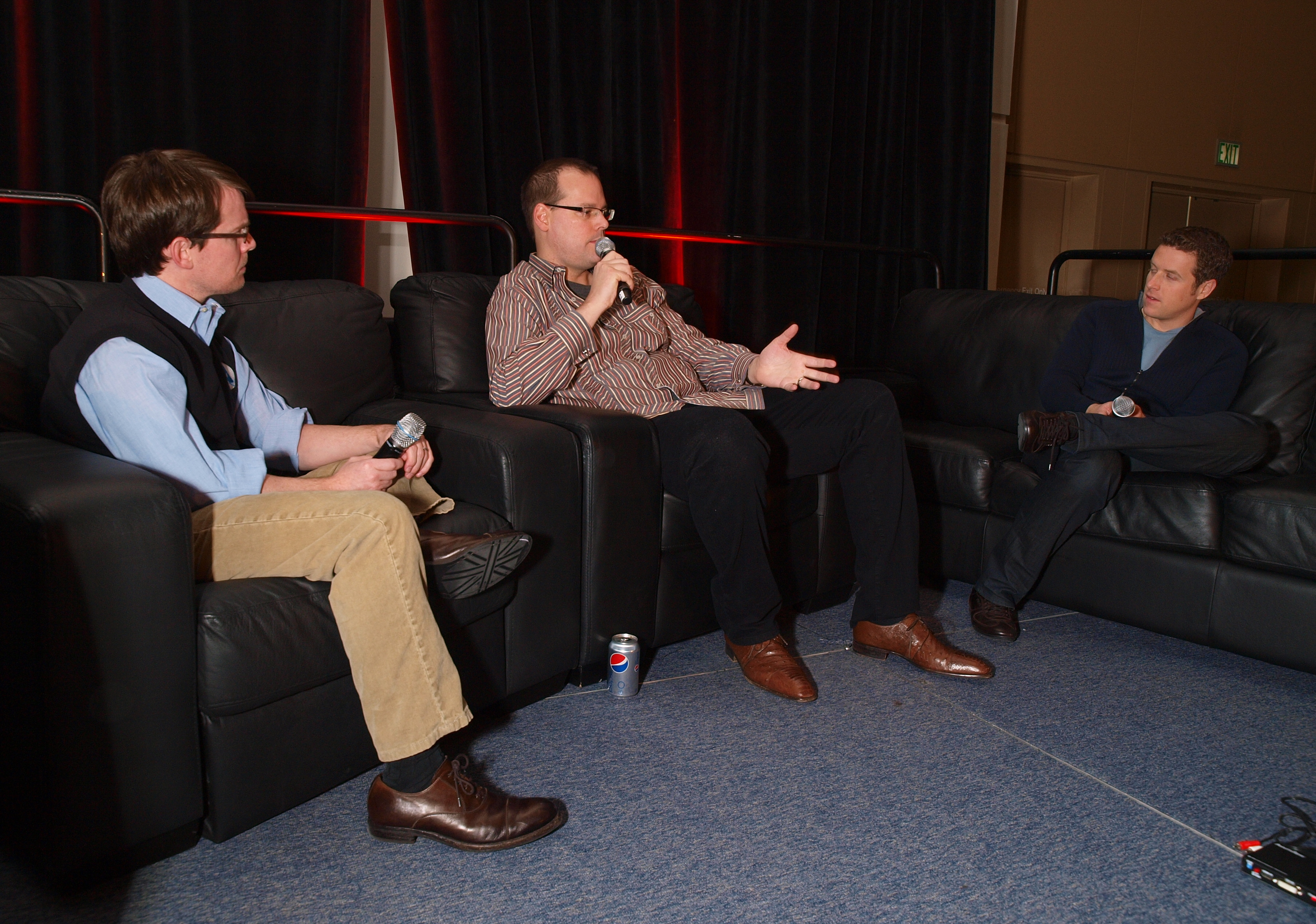
Staten (left) discusses building game franchises at the 2010 Game Developers Conference.

On release, Contact Harvest reached a top spot of #3 on the New York Times bestseller list, where it remained for four weeks. The novel also appeared on the USA Today bestsellers list at the same time. Reviewers noted that despite being an unproven writer, Staten had succeeded in crafting an excellent novel. The novel's success was considered to be evidence that games were breaking into the mainstream, and that the genre was becoming increasingly about the story.

After Contact Harvest's release Staten played an important role in the development of offshoots to the Halo franchise. He traveled to New Zealand several times to work with Peter Jackson and Weta Workshop. Staten assisted with the fiction of Ensemble Studios title Halo Wars, and the now-postponed Halo film. In interviews, Staten has explained that the game's protagonist, the Master Chief, would serve as a supporting character rather than who the film would focus on. He worked on story development for the Halo 3 expansion, Halo 3: ODST. Staten provided the voices for a number of characters as placeholder audio during the representational play testing of the game in December 2008. Staten was last working for Bungie as the writer and design director for Destiny. On September 24, 2013, Bungie announced that Staten had left the company to pursue new creative challenges.

=== Microsoft ===
Staten rejoined Microsoft Studios (now known as Xbox Game Studios) as a senior creative director on January 9, 2014. On March 12, 2015, 343 Industries' official website posted a blog post detailing a list of upcoming Halo novels. One of the novels listed is Halo: Shadow of Intent authored by Joseph Staten and released on December 7, 2015. He is the lead writer for Microsoft's ReCore and Crackdown 3, released on September 13, 2016 and February 15, 2019 respectively.

On August 26, 2020, 343 Industries announced that Staten had joined the team as Campaign Project Lead for Halo Infinite. 343 Industries later announced that Joseph's role had changed to Head of Creative for Halo Infinite. Staten left 343 Industries for his former position within the publishing division for Xbox Game Studios in 2023, and announced he would be leaving Microsoft entirely later that year.

Staten joined a California studio at Netflix called Team Blue, where he became creative director on what was described as a "AAA multiplatform game and original IP." He and the rest of the studio's employees were laid off in October 2024.

== Personal life ==
Staten is married and has two children. On June 18, 2011, he gave the convocation address to the class of 2011 of the Northwestern University School of Communication.
