= The Red Hand Gang =

- Genre: Adventure; Children's
- Directed by: Charles R. Rondeau
- Starring: James Bond III
- Country of origin: United States
- Original language: English
- No. of seasons: 1
- No. of episodes: 12

Production
- Executive producers: R.S. Allen; Harvey Bullock; William P. D'Angelo
- Camera setup: Single-camera
- Running time: 22–24 minutes
- Production company: D'Angelo-Bullock-Allen Productions

Original release
- Network: NBC
- Release: September 10 – November 26, 1977

The Red Hand Gang is an American live-action Saturday morning television series that aired on NBC from September 10 to November 26, 1977. The show featured five crime-solving pre-teens and their dog Boomer, who lived in the inner city. The group was so named because its members left red hand prints on fences to mark where they had been.

== Main characters ==
Members of the Red Hand Gang include:

- Frankie played by Matthew Laborteaux
- Doc played by James Bond III
- Joanne played by Jolie Newman
- Lil' Bill played by Johnny Brogna
- J.R. played by J.R. Miller
- Boomer, their dog

The episodes of The Red Hand Gang, unlike those of other Saturday morning shows, were grouped into multiple arcs: one of five parts, one of four, and one of three. Each episode ended in a cliffhanger.

== Synopsis and supporting cast ==
The first adventure is split across the first five episodes. A young boy called Johnny, played by Robert Ahlers, is kidnapped and held for ransom in an old house. The Red Hand Gang find out where the boy is being held by trailing one of the kidnappers, played by Maureen Arthur, to their hideout. The gang set traps to scare the other kidnappers, played by Anthony Zerbe and James Hampton but the kidnappers move to another location with the gang in pursuit.

The second story is split across the next four episodes. The gang go to a hotel to meet their hero, a football player called O.K. Oakins, played by Van Williams, who is the special guest at a charity auction. The star attraction of the auction is a priceless jewel. Whilst at the hotel the gang stumble across a plot to steal the jewel by replacing O.K. Oakins with a lookalike and replacing the real gem with a fake. The two jewel thieves are played by Buck Kartalian and James Griffith.

The final story is set over the final three episodes. The gang visit an animal sanctuary with their friend Holly, who is deaf, played by Dawn Lyn. The animal sanctuary features a chimpanzee called Maxwell who can understand sign language. Unbeknownst to the gang, the chimpanzee is going to be used by two crooks (played by Tom Reese and Walter Burke) to help them carry out a museum robbery.

The show has distinctive opening and closing theme tunes also heard during the episodes at times. The opening theme is a light La la tune and the credits accompanying this show each of the main cast being suspended or jumping into space at various angles including upside down, The end theme is a more hard hitting theme appropriate as each episode ended on a cliffhanger.

== Filming locations ==
Scenes for the series were shot in and around Los Angeles, California.

The opening credits contain scenes that were shot on South Seaside Avenue in San Pedro, showing the gang running along a pier that is part of Terminal Island in the Port of Los Angeles. The same location was used in the first adventure for the scene where the kidnappers are holding the kidnapped boy on board a boat. The pier is located opposite Marine Sheet Metal Works. The pier itself is located at berth 259/260 of the Port of Los Angeles and next to the building of the Southern California Marine Institute. Coordinates: 33°44′9.22″N 118°16′13.79″W.

Some of the outdoor scenes for the first adventure (5 episodes) were filmed in Venice, Los Angeles. During one scene, the character Frankie trails a female kidnapper along what is Windward Avenue, pausing at the intersection of Windward Avenue and Pacific Avenue outside a shop. The shop is now a cafe called Cafe Collage. Coordinates: 33°59′16.29″N 118°28′19.98″W.

During the second adventure about a jewel heist. The fictional football player O.K. Oakins is kidnapped and replaced with a stooge, in order to steal a priceless diamond during a charity auction taking place in a hotel. The hotel used for filming is now the Ritz-Carlton Huntington Hotel in Pasadena. At the time of the filming, the hotel was called the Wentworth Hotel, but uses the fictitious name, The Park Hotel, in the episode. Coordinates: 34°7′7.77″N 118°8′1.67″W.

In the third adventure about a museum robbery, the street scenes are filmed on Clinton Street and North Norton Avenue in Hollywood. The rear of Raleigh Studios doubles as the entrance to the museum. This location is about one block from Melrose Avenue. Coordinates: 34°4′53.98″N 118°19′2.97″W.

== Cancellation ==
The Red Hand Gang was cancelled in November 1977 — not even halfway into the television season. The cancellation was partly due to its 12:30PM ET time slot, when many key affiliates tend to preempt NBC programming after 12 Noon ET for their own programming, especially college football. The series aired on NBC for the last time in January of 1978.

== Episodes ==
Episode No.	No. in story	Title	First aired (US)	First aired (UK)
1	1/5	The Face at the Window	10 September 1977	9 May 1980
The gang discovers the place where a kidnapped boy, Johnny Roberts, is being held hostage.
2	2/5	The Spooky Hideout	17 September 1977	16 May 1980
The gang follows one of the kidnappers to a new hideout...a haunted mansion.
3	3/5	The Search	24 September 1977	23 May 1980
The gang are in great danger as they look for Johnny in the old mansion.
4	4/5	Beware the Red Hand Gang	1 October 1977	30 May 1980
The gang play ghosts to frighten the kidnappers.
5	5/5	The Mystery Boat	8 October 1977	6 June 1980
The gang send out a distress signal.
6	1/4	The Man in the Mask	15 October 1977	13 June 1980
The gang is up against a jewel thief posing as a football star.
7	2/4	The Missing Jewels	22 October 1977	20 June 1980
The gang plan to unmask the impostor at a jewel auction.
8	3/4	Search and Rescue	29 October 1977	27 June 1980
The gang race against time to expose the criminals before the jewel is destroyed.
9	4/4	Doc's Big Idea	5 November 1977	4 July 1980
The gang find the real sportsman and plan his escape.
10	1/3	The Photo Clue	12 November 1977	7 September 1979
The gang visits an animal park and begins to uncover a plot involving a chimpanzee.
11	2/3	Monkey Business	19 November 1977	14 September 1979
The gang has discovered a plot to train a chimpanzee to steal a valuable carving.
12	3/3	Devil's Canyon	26 November 1977	21 September 1979
The crooks are ready to steal the valuable jade and the gang plan to stop them.

== Overseas ==
In the UK episodes 10–12 were first aired in 1979, followed by the remaining episodes in 1980. Episodes 1–9 were repeated over the Christmas period later that same year and episodes 1–5 were broadcast again in 1983 and 1985.

== Home media ==
The Red Hand Gang was initially released on DVD in the U.K. only, on September 30, 2008. A 2-disc DVD set was released on July 28, 2009, in the U.S.
