= Brothers (2009 TV series) =

- Genre: Sitcom
- Created by: Don Reo
- Directed by: Ted Wass
- Starring: Michael Strahan; Daryl "Chill" Mitchell; Carl Weathers; CCH Pounder
- Country of origin: United States
- Original language: English
- No. of seasons: 1
- No. of episodes: 13

Production
- Executive producers: Don Reo; Mitchell Hurwitz; Eric Tannenbaum; Kim Tannenbaum
- Camera setup: Multi-camera
- Production companies: Impact Zone Productions; Tantamount Studios; Sony Pictures Television

Original release
- Network: Fox
- Release: September 25 – December 27, 2009

Brothers is an American sitcom television series which ran on Fox from September 25, 2009 to December 27, 2009. It originally aired on Friday nights at 8:00 pm ET before moving to Sunday nights at 7:00 pm ET as part of the 2009 fall schedule.

== Premise ==
The series stars former NFL star Michael Strahan and Daryl "Chill" Mitchell as estranged brothers who are pressured to get along by their parents (played by Carl Weathers and C. C. H. Pounder) after Strahan's character moves back to his home town of Houston. Strahan's character is retired from the NFL, while Mitchell's character, a paraplegic using a wheelchair after a car wreck, runs a restaurant.

== Cast ==
- Michael Strahan as Michael "Mike" Trainor
- Daryl Mitchell as Chill Trainor
- CCH Pounder as Adele Trainor
- Carl Weathers as Coach Trainor

== Episodes ==
Every episode of the series was directed by Ted Wass.

No.	Title	Written by	Original release date	Prod. code
1	"Pilot"	Don Reo	September 25, 2009	101
In the series premiere, Mike Trainor seemingly has it all. He's a good-looking, wealthy and recently retired NFL player living the high life in New York City. With one phone call from his mom, Adele, Mike's life changes in an instant. He comes home to Houston to find that his brother Chill, whose life changed drastically after a car accident left him in a wheelchair, is struggling to keep his restaurant afloat and that his father's memory is not as sharp as it used to be. When Adele reveals everyone's secrets, the family decides it's time for a fresh start.
2	"House Rules/Anniversary"	Don Reo	September 25, 2009	103
Mike's date spends the night at his parents' place propelling his mom, Adele, to set specific house rules for her very grown sons. As all the family members try to find their way living together again as adults, Mike and Chill are taken aback at their new assigned daily chores and strict limitations on overnight guests. Meanwhile, Coach forgets his and Adele's anniversary and lands in the doghouse, forcing him to come up with a creative way to make it up to her.
3	"Mom at the Bar/Train Buddy"	Adrienne Carter	October 2, 2009	106
When another bartender at Trainor's quits, it becomes apparent that business is suffering due to Mike and Chill's inability to get along. Adele decides to unite her sons by making herself their enemy, and her plan is set into motion when she takes over the open bartending position and expands her role beyond serving drinks. Meanwhile, Coach enjoys his newfound freedom with Adele out of the house.
4	"Snoop/Fat Kid"	Kevin Rooney	October 9, 2009	107
Mike and Chill hire their cousin Kenny (guest star Snoop Dogg), a shady lawyer who specializes in debt and fraud, to recover Mike's laundered assets. But when Kenny is only able to locate funds donated to a children's charity, Mike wrestles with a tough decision. Meanwhile, Coach and Adele work together to help a heavy kid pass gym class. Features cameos from Arsenio Hall and Kevin Nash.
5	"Lenny"	Don Reo	October 11, 2009	102
When Adele's sister, Cynthia, and her offensive husband, Lenny, come to town, Adele pleads with Coach to be on his best behavior. Meanwhile, Mike Tyson pays a surprise visit to Trainor's, and Mike and Chill compete with each other for the affection of Mike's high-school sweetheart, when she also shows up unexpectedly.
6	"Commercial/Coach DMV"	Don Reo	October 18, 2009	108
Mike's agent secures some on-camera opportunities for extra income, including a post-game commentary with former NFL rival Anthony "Avalanche" Carter and a commercial spot with Adele. But when both Avalanche and Adele prove to be extremely difficult screen partners, Mike's appearances don't go as smoothly as planned. Meanwhile, Coach needs to renew his license but is having problems passing the test. Chill, fearing that he will become Coach's personal driver if Coach can't pass the test, goes out of his way to help him make the grade.
7	"Meet Mike Trainor/Assistant Coach"	Alyson Fouse	October 23, 2009	104
When Coach's football team suffers an embarrassing losing steak, he relieves Chill of his duties as assistant coach and recruits Mike to help him devise some winning plays. Meanwhile, Trainor's newest hostess spreads some juicy rumors to help attract customers to Trainor's, but when her gossip attracts Nancy O'Dell, Kim Kardashian stops by the restaurant to set the record straight.
8	"Mike's Comeback"	Adrienne Carter	November 8, 2009	105
Mike is given a second chance to play for the NFL, and it seems like his financial woes may finally be coming to an end. But when making the team is contingent on passing a physical in only two-weeks' time, Mike turns to Coach and Chill to get him back into shape. Meanwhile, Adele meddles with a student's decision to play professional baseball.
9	"Week in Chair"	J.J. Wall	November 22, 2009	109
Mike offends Chill when Mike contests that being in a wheelchair has many advantages. To prove Mike wrong, Chill bets Mike that he can't last one week in a chair. Mike accepts and puts his Super Bowl ring on the line, but once the week begins, Mike is surprised by his experience.
10	"Snoop Returns"	Sassi Darling	December 13, 2009	110
With the help of Cousin Kenny's legal aid, Coach's brother Maurice is released from jail and arrives at the Trainors' home to spend some time with the family. Despite Adele's initial skepticism, the "new" Maurice turns out to be quite a stand-up guy. Meanwhile, Mike makes a play for a new waitress at Trainor's, and Jimmy Johnson stops by the restaurant to talk football.
11	"Christmas"	Dean Lorey	December 13, 2009	112
Adele's brother-in law Lenny shows up on the Trainor's doorstep when his wife, jets off to Mexico solo, and Coach and Adele look for ways to bring them back together. Meanwhile, Adele preps for Christmas with the family, but her plans are disrupted when Mike and Chill are called into work.
12	"Girls, Girls, Girls"	Don Reo	December 27, 2009	113
Adele sets Chill up on a blind date with Jenny, a social worker from her school, and Chill is surprised by how much he likes her. Meanwhile, Adele disapproves when Mike makes a play for one of her friends, and Coach goes out of his way to be more romantic
13	"Follow the Story"	Charlie Hornsby	December 27, 2009	111
A writer from a sports magazine comes to Houston for a story about Mike, and as part of her research, she spends time getting to know the Trainors. But once each family member puts in his or her two cents, the focus of her story shifts from future hall-of-famer Michael to a lesser-known football phenomenon. Meanwhile, Adele is left frustrated by Coach's superstitious behavior surrounding his football team's winning streak

== Reception ==
The pilot received, according to Metacritic, mixed or average reviews. Ratings for the show's debut were disappointing and did not improve much over the course of its 13-episode run. Fox declined to order any more episodes for the remainder of the 2009-2010 TV season and later confirmed that the show had been canceled.

== Ratings ==
#	Episode	Air Date	Timeslot	Rating	Share	18–49	Viewers	Weekly Rank
1	"Pilot"	September 25, 2009	Friday 8:00 P.M.	1.8	3	1.0/4	2.82	
2	"House Rules/Anniversary"	September 25, 2009	Friday 8:00 P.M.	100	3	1.0/4	2.81	
3	"Mom at the Bar/Train Buddy"	October 2, 2009	Friday 8:00 P.M.	1.6	3	0.8/3	2.42	
4	"Snoop/Fat Kid"	October 9, 2009	Friday 8:00 P.M.	1.5	3	0.8/3	2.34	
5	"Lenny"	October 11, 2009	Sunday 7:00 P.M.	1.1	3		2.95	
6	"Commercial/Coach DMV"	October 18, 2009	Sunday 7:00 P.M.	2.6	5	1.7/5	4.47	
7	"Meet Mike Trainor/Assistant Coach"	October 23, 2009	Friday 8:30 P.M.	1.4	3	0.8/3	2.35	
8	"Mike's Comeback"	November 8, 2009	Sunday 7:00 P.M.	2.3	6		5.72	
9	"Week in Chair"	November 22, 2009	Sunday 7:00 P.M.	1.7	3	1.0/3	2.61	
10	"Snoop Returns"	December 13, 2009	Sunday 7:00 P.M.	1.1	3		3.35	
11	"Christmas"	December 13, 2009	Sunday 7:30 P.M.	1.0	3		2.81	
12	"Girls, Girls, Girls"	December 27, 2009	Sunday 7:00 P.M.	0.8	2	0.8/2	2.34	
13	"Follow the Story"	December 27, 2009	Sunday 7:30 P.M.	0.6	2	0.6/2	1.89	

=== Sunday repeats ===
Order	Episode	Rating	Share	Rating/Share (18–49)	Viewers (millions)	Rank (Timeslot)	Rank (Night)
1	"Pilot"	2.9	5	2.5/8	6.26	3	15
2	"House Rules/Anniversary"	2.1	6	1.7/5	3.73	4	15
3	"Snoop/Fat Kid"	1.9	3	1.1/3	2.95	4	18
