= CCH Pounder =

Guyanese actress (born 1952)

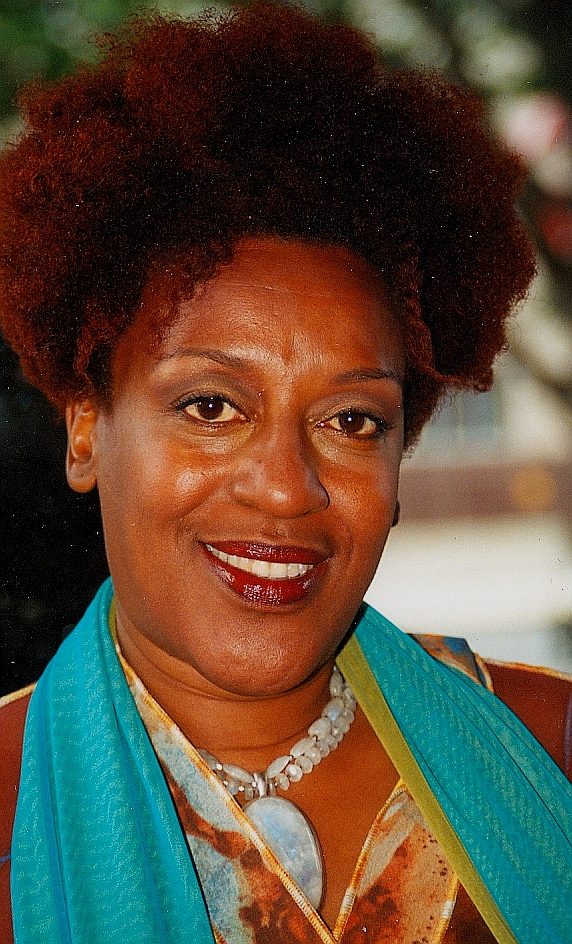
- Pounder in 2010
- Born: Carol Christine Hilaria Pounder; December 25, 1952 (age 73); Georgetown, British Guiana
- Education: Ithaca College (BFA)
- Occupation: Actress
- Years active: 1979–present
- Spouse: Boubacar Kone (m. 1990; died 2016)
- Children: 3
- Website: cchpounder.net

Carol Christine Hilaria Pounder (born December 25, 1952) is a Guyanese actress based in the United States. She is best known for portraying Claudette Wyms on the American police drama series The Shield (2002–08), Mo'at in the Avatar franchise (2009–present), and medical examiner Dr. Loretta Wade on NCIS: New Orleans (2014–21). She has received four Primetime Emmy Award nominations for her roles in The X-Files (1994), ER (1994–97), The Shield, and The No. 1 Ladies' Detective Agency (2009).

Pounder portrayed recurring roles on television such as Irene Frederic in Warehouse 13 (2009–14) and District Attorney Tyne Patterson in Sons of Anarchy (2013–14). Pounder was also the voice of Amanda Waller in the animated series Justice League Unlimited (2004–06), a role that she has reprised in various later DC Comics media.

In film, she appeared in All That Jazz (1979), Go Tell It on the Mountain (1984), Prizzi's Honor (1985), Bagdad Cafe (1987), Postcards from the Edge (1990), Psycho IV: The Beginning (1990), Benny & Joon (1993), Demon Knight (1995), Face/Off (1997), End of Days (1999), Orphan (2009), Godzilla: King of the Monsters (2019), and The Naked Gun (2025).

== Early life and education ==
Carol Christine Hilaria Pounder was born in British Guiana (now Guyana) on December 25, 1952. Her name was given in honor of her grandmothers and godmothers. She was raised on a sugar plantation managed by her father, Ronald Arlington Pounder. At one point, her family moved to London, where her mother, Betsy Enid Arnella James, worked at the United States Embassy. Pounder attended a Catholic boarding school in Sussex, England.

Pounder enrolled at Hastings College of Arts and Technology where she studied painting, but dropped out in her first year after moving to the United States. Her family had already settled in New York while she was attending school. Pounder graduated from Ithaca College in 1975. She said her parents did not support her choice to be an actress; her mother wanted her to be a newscaster.

== Career ==
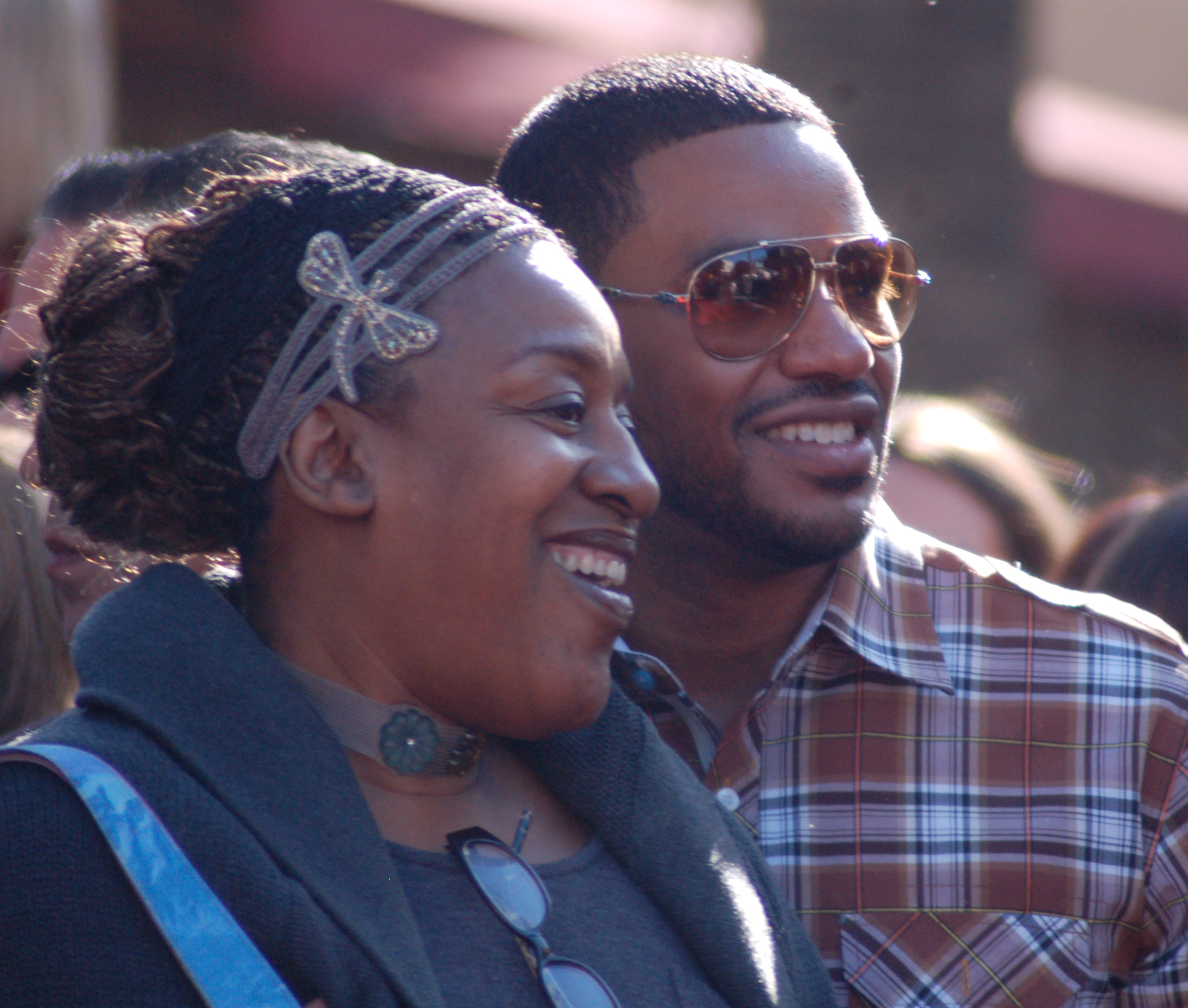
Pounder with Avatar co-star Laz Alonso in December 2009

Pounder made her film debut in Bob Fosse's musical drama All that Jazz (1979). She continued her career in New York City theater, where she starred in Shakespeare in the Park productions of Coriolanus and The Mighty Gents in 1979, and the Broadway play Open Admissions in 1984. She moved to Los Angeles in 1982. She starred in the film Bagdad Café, and has made smaller appearances in many other films.

Pounder focused primarily on her television career. In the early 1980s, she first appeared in guest roles on Hill Street Blues, and then on several shows (The Cosby Show, L.A. Law, The X-Files, Living Single, and Quantum Leap) before landing a long-running recurring role as Dr. Angela Hicks on ER from 1994 to 1997. She also co-starred in the Tales From the Crypt feature film Demon Knight (1995). She then returned to guest appearances on other shows, including The Practice, Law & Order: Special Victims Unit, Millennium, The West Wing (where she was considered for the role of C. J. Cregg), and the short-lived sitcom Women in Prison.

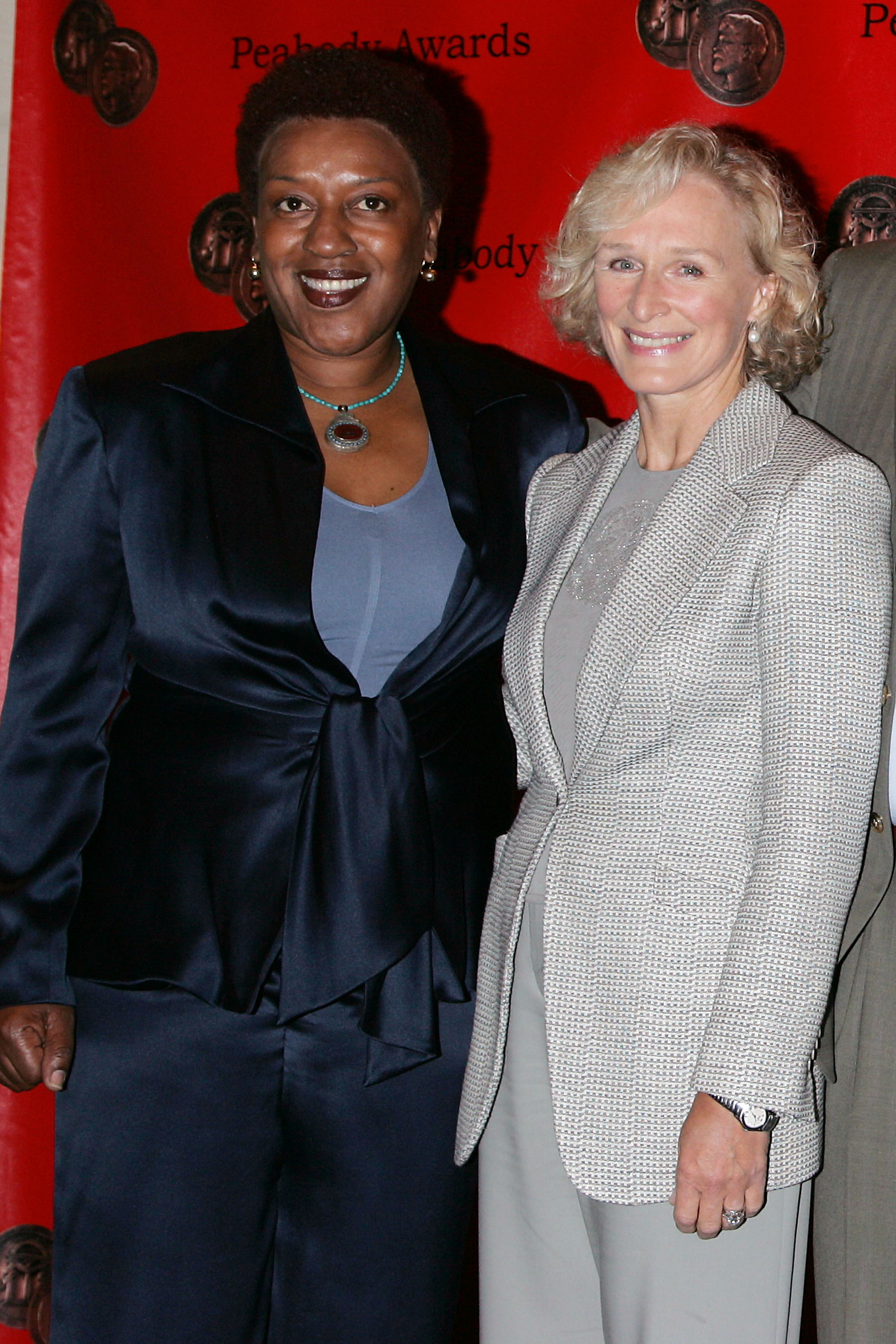
CCH Pounder and Glenn Close at the Peabody Awards in 2006

From 2002 to 2008, she starred as Detective Claudette Wyms in the FX police drama The Shield. For this role she was nominated for the Primetime Emmy Award for Outstanding Supporting Actress in a Drama Series in 2005 and an NAACP Image Award. She had previously been nominated for an Emmy in 1995 for guest starring in The X-Files and in 1997 for her supporting role on ER. She has also lent her voice to several video games and animated projects, including Aladdin and the King of Thieves, True Crime: Streets of LA, Gargoyles as Desdemona and Coldfire, and Justice League Unlimited as government agent Amanda Waller, which role she reprised for the animated film adaptation of the comic book Superman/Batman: Public Enemies as well as the video game Batman: Arkham Origins, its sequel Batman: Arkham Origins Blackgate, and another animated film that takes place in continuity with the games, Batman: Assault on Arkham.

Pounder was also one of the readers for the HBO film Unchained Memories: Readings from the Slave Narrative (2003). She appeared on the Syfy series Warehouse 13 from 2009 until its finale on May 19, 2014. Pounder also was one of the stars of Fox's cancelled 2009 sitcom Brothers. Pounder was nominated for the Emmy Award for Outstanding Guest Actress in a Drama Series for her appearance in the BBC/HBO series The No. 1 Ladies' Detective Agency. She had a recurring role as DA Thyne Patterson on the FX crime drama series Sons of Anarchy (2013–14). She co-starred in The Mortal Instruments: City of Bones (2013). In Disney's The Lion Guard she voices Kongwe, the wise old turtle.

In 1996, Pounder served as a guest judge for the 1996 Miss USA Pageant, in South Padre Island, Texas.

== Advocacy ==
As one of the founders of Artists for a Free South Africa (later renamed Artists for a New South Africa) in 1989, along with a number of other Hollywood actors, including Alfre Woodard, Pounder helped to energize awareness of post-apartheid and HIV/AIDS issues. In an interview, she said about the pandemic: "When it's this massive disease, and it's affecting things in 5,000 different ways, it requires great strength and power – and there is power in numbers. So we need to involve as many people as we can, like we do with ANSA. I call it my little engine that could. It is a remarkable, tiny organization with a huge outreach. We use actors and artists with the biggest voices so they can use every opportunity to talk about AIDS."

== Filmography ==
Key
†	Denotes films that have not yet been released

=== Film ===
Year	Title	Role	Notes
1979	All That Jazz	Nurse Blake	
1979	Coriolanus	Valeria	
1980	Union City	Mrs. Lewis	
1982	I'm Dancing as Fast as I Can	Anne	
1984	Go Tell It on the Mountain	Deborah	
1985	Prizzi's Honor	'Peaches' Altamont	
1987	Bagdad Café	Brenda	
1990	Postcards from the Edge	Julie Marsden	
1992	The Importance of Being Earnest	Miss Prism	
1993	Benny & Joon	Dr. Garvey	
1993	RoboCop 3	Bertha	
1993	Sliver	Lt. Victoria Hendrix	
1995	Demon Knight	Irene	
1996	Aladdin and the King of Thieves	The Oracle (voice)	
1997	Face/off	Hollis Miller	
1998	Melting Pot	Lucinda Davis	
1998	Blossoms and Veils	–	Short
1999	Funny Valentines	Ethel B.	
1999	The Big Day	Pearl	
1999	End of Days	Det. Marge Francis	
2001	Things Behind the Sun	Judge	
2002	Tét Grenné	Sally	
2002	Baby of the Family	Nurse Bloom	
2003	Unchained Memories	Reader	
2008	Rain	Ms. Adams	
2008	Breaking the Maya Code	Narrator	Documentary
2009	Orphan	Sister Abigail	
2009	Superman/Batman: Public Enemies	Amanda Waller (voice)	
2009	Avatar	Mo'at	
2010	My Girlfriend's Back	Constance	
2012	Home Again	Dulsay Mooreland	
2013	The Mortal Instruments: City of Bones	Madame Dorothea	
2014	Batman: Assault on Arkham	Amanda Waller (voice)	
2019	Godzilla: King of the Monsters	Senator Williams	
2022	Avatar: The Way of Water	Mo'at	
2023	Rustin	Anna Arnold Hedgeman	
2025	The Naked Gun	Chief Davis	
2025	Avatar: Fire and Ash	Mo'at	

=== Television ===
Year	Title	Role	Notes
1981	Hill Street Blues	Jasmine	Episode: "The Second Oldest Profession"
1982	Hill Street Blues	Wilna Tucker	Episode: "Little Boil Blue"
1984	Booker	Jane	Television film
1985	American Playhouse	Deborah	Episode: "Go Tell It on the Mountain"
1985	The Atlanta Child Murders	Venus Taylor	2 episodes
1986	If Tomorrow Comes	Ernestine Littlechap	Episode: "Episode #1.1"
1986	Resting Place	Ada Johnson	Television film
1986	As Summers Die	Priscilla	Television film
1986	Valerie	Mrs. Davis	Episode: "Full Moon"
1986	Cagney & Lacey	Timmons	Episode: "Disenfranchised"
1986	Hill Street Blues	Ms. Jones	Episode: "Amazing Grace"
1986–92	L.A. Law	Judge Roseann Robin	Recurring cast (season 1), guest (season 5–6)
1987	The Line	Anna Mae Demesy	Television film
1987	On the Edge	–	Television film
1987–88	Women in Prison	Dawn Murphy	Main cast
1988	Run Till You Fall	Janice	Television film
1988	Leap of Faith	Roberta	Television film
1989	CBS Schoolbreak Special	Renee Cook	Episode: "My Past Is My Own"
1989	227	Lucinda Markle	Episode: "Babes in the Woods"
1989	Third Degree Burn	Julie Cartwright	Television film
1989	Miami Vice	Yvonne	Episode: "Too Much, Too Late"
1989	No Place Like Home	Prue	Television film
1990	Murder in Mississippi	Fannie Lee Chaney	Television film
1990	Common Ground	Rachel Twymon	Episode: "Part I & Part II"
1990	Quantum Leap	Mama Harper	Episode: "Black on White on Fire"
1990	Psycho IV: The Beginning	Fran Ambrose	Television film
1990	Cop Rock	Willa Phelan	Recurring cast
1991	Lifestories	Roxanne Tevis	Episode: "Darryl Devis"
1991	True Colors	Judge Fallows	Episode: "Presumed Guilty"
1992	Home Improvement	Assistant	Episode: "What About Bob?"
1992	The Cosby Show	Clair's friend	Episode: "Clair's Reunion"
1993	The Ernest Green Story	Daisy Bates	Television film
1993	For Their Own Good	Naomi Brinker	Television film
1993	Lifepod	Mayvene	Television film
1993	The Disappearance of Christina	Detective Davis	Television film
1993	Return to Lonesome Dove	Sara Pickett	Main cast
1993	New Year	Eudora Kellogg	Television film
1994	Birdland	Nurse Lucy	Main cast
1994	South Central	Dr. LeBrock	Episode: "Co-op"
1994	Biker Mice from Mars	Stonecutter	Episode: "Stone Broke"
1994	The X-Files	Agent Lucy Kazdin	Episode: "Duane Barry"
1994	Robin's Hoods	Vivian Castro	Episode: "Unto Thyself Be True"
1994–95	Sweet Justice	Judge Addison	2 episodes
1994–97	ER	Dr. Angela Hicks	Supporting cast (season 1–4)
1995	Zooman	Ash	Television film
1995	White Dwarf	Nurse Shabana	Television film
1995	Living Single	Nina Shaw	Episode: "Mommy Not Dearest"
1995	Jack Reed: One of Our Own	Mrs. Harris	Television film
1995–96	Gargoyles	Desdemona	Voice, 3 episodes
1996	All She Ever Wanted	Dr. Marilyn Tower	Television film
1996	If These Walls Could Talk	Nurse Mrs. Ford	Television film
1996–98	Millennium	Dr. Cheryl Andrews	Recurring cast
1997	Things That Go Bump	Harriet Napolean	Television film
1997	House of Frankenstein	Dr. Shauna Kendall	2 episodes
1998	Final Justice	Danielle Kline	Television film
1998	Little Girl Fly Away	Dr. Geddes	Television film
1998	Histeria!	Harriet Tubman	Voice, episode: "General Sherman's Campsite"
1998	Ghost Cop	Detective	Episode: "Pilot"
1999	Batman Beyond	Anchorwoman	Voice, episode: "Rebirth"
1999	NetForce	FBI Director Sandra Knight	Television film
1999	Detention	Miss Powers	Voice, episode: "The Contest"
1999	A Touch of Hope	Lily Keyes	Television film
1999–2000	Rocket Power	Officer Shirley	Voice
2000	The West Wing	Deborah O'Leary	Episode: "Celestial Navigation"
2000	Rude Awakening	Stacey	Episode: "Plastered"
2000	The Outer Limits	Stranger	Episode: "Decompression"
2000	Cora Unashamed	Ma Jenkins	Television film
2000	Disappearing Acts	Mrs. Swift	Television film
2000–01	Static Shock	Mayor	Voice, 2 episodes
2001	The Practice	Elaine Washington	2 episodes
2001	Crossing Jordan	Libby Bell	Episode: "Mortality"
2001	Boycott	Jo Ann Robinson	Television film
2001	Strong Medicine	Libby Bell	Episode: "Mortality"
2001	The District	Eilen Carmicheal	Episode: "To Serve and Protect"
2001–10	Law & Order: Special Victims Unit	Carolyn Maddox	Recurring cast
2002	For the People	Millie Towns	Episode: "To DNA or Not to DNA"
2002–08	The Shield	Claudette Wyms	Main cast
2003	Jackie Chan Adventures	Miss Kimber	Voice, episode: "The Shadow Eaters"
2004	Girlfriends	Dr. Myers	Episode: "Prophet & Loss"
2004	Redemption: The Stan Tookie Williams Story	Winnie Mandela	Television film
2004–06	Justice League Unlimited	Amanda Waller	Voice, recurring role
2005	Numb3rs	Lieutenant Lee Havercamp	Episode: "Vector"
2006	W.I.T.C.H.	Queen Kadma	Voice, recurring cast (season 2)
2007	American Masters	Narrator	Voice, episode: "Novel Reflections: The American Dream"
2008	The Tower	Evie	Television film
2009	The No. 1 Ladies' Detective Agency	Mrs. Curtin	Episode: "The Boy with an African Heart"
2009	Brothers	Adele Trainor	Main cast
2009–14	Warehouse 13	Mrs. Irene Frederic	Recurring cast
2011	Revenge	Warden Sharon Stiles	2 episodes
2013	Perception	FBI Psychiatrist	Episode: "Warrior"
2013–14	Sons of Anarchy	District Attorney Tyne Patterson	Recurring cast (season 6–7)
2014	NCIS	Dr. Loretta Wade	Episode: "Crescent City"
2014	Beware the Batman	Mayor Marion Grange	Voice, 2 episodes
2014–21	NCIS: New Orleans	Dr. Loretta Wade	Main cast
2015	Archer	Claudette Kane	Voice, episode: "The Kanes"
2018	The Lion Guard	Kongwe	Voice, episode: "The Wisdom of Kongwe"
2021	The Good Fight	Vinetta Clark	2 episodes
2023	Full Circle	Savitri Mahabir	Miniseries
2024	3 Body Problem	Secretary General Lilian Joseph	2 episodes
2025	Chicago Med	Dr. Eleanor Hess	Episode: "In the Wake"
2026	Cape Fear	Noa Toussaint	Main role
2026	The Terror: Devil in Silver	Miss Chris	Main cast

=== Video games ===
Year	Title	Voice role	Notes
1997	Fallout	Head Scribe Vree	
2003	True Crime: Streets of LA	Chief Wanda Parks	
2013	Batman: Arkham Origins	Amanda Waller	
2013	Batman: Arkham Origins Blackgate	Amanda Waller	
2014	Skylanders: Trap Team	Golden Queen	
2015	Skylanders: SuperChargers	Golden Queen	Uncredited
2016	Skylanders: Imaginators	Golden Queen	

== Stage appearances ==
Year	Title	Role	Venue	Notes	Ref.
1975	Androcles and the Lion	The Lion	Cumston Hall, Monmouth	Understudy	
1975	King Lear	Goneril	Cumston Hall, Monmouth	Understudy	
1975	The Comedy of Errors	Courtesan	Cumston Hall, Monmouth		
1975	The Comedy of Errors	Adriana	Cumston Hall, Monmouth	Understudy	
1976	The Sunshine Boys	Registered Nurse	Actors Theatre of Louisville, Louisville		
1978	S.S. Glencairn	Reel	Long Wharf Theatre, New Haven		
1979	Coriolanus	Valeria	Delacorte Theater, New York	Shakespeare in the Park	
1979	The Mighty Gents	Rita	Delacorte Theater, New York	Shakespeare in the Park	
1984	Open Admissions	Mrs. Brewster	Music Box Theatre, New York		
1987	Antony and Cleopatra	Charmian	Los Angeles Theatre Center, Los Angeles		
1988	Generations of the Dead in the Abyss of Coney Island Madness		Mark Taper Forum, Los Angeles		

== Awards and nominations ==
Year	Award	Category	Work	Result	Ref.
1995	Primetime Emmy Award	Outstanding Guest Actress in a Drama Series	The X-Files	Nominated	
1996	NAACP Image Award	Outstanding Supporting Actress in a Drama Series	ER	Nominated	
1997	Primetime Emmy Award	Outstanding Supporting Actress in a Drama Series	ER	Nominated	
1997	Audie Award	Inspirational/Spiritual	Grow Old Along with Me, the Best Is Yet to Be	Won	
1997	Audie Award	Multi-Voiced Performance	Grow Old Along with Me, the Best Is Yet to Be	Nominated	
1997	Grammy Award	Best Spoken Word or Non-Musical Album	Grow Old Along with Me, the Best Is Yet to Be	Nominated	
1998	NAACP Image Award	Outstanding Supporting Actress in a Drama Series	ER	Nominated	
1998	Audie Award	Multi-Voiced Performance	Women in the Material World	Won	
1998	Audie Award	Nonfiction, Abridged	Women in the Material World	Won	
2002	Black Reel Award	Best Supporting Actress in a Television Movie	Boycott	Nominated	
2002	NAACP Image Award	Outstanding Supporting Actress in a Drama Series	Law & Order: Special Victims Unit	Nominated	
2003	Satellite Award	Best Actress – Television Series Drama	The Shield	Won	
2003	NAACP Image Award	Outstanding Actress in a Drama Series	The Shield	Nominated	
2004	Satellite Award	Best Actress – Television Series Drama	The Shield	Won	
2004	Black Reel Award	Best Supporting Actress in a Television Movie	Redemption: The Stan Tookie Williams Story	Won	
2004	NAACP Image Award	Outstanding Actress in a Drama Series	The Shield	Nominated	
2005	Primetime Emmy Award	Outstanding Supporting Actress in a Drama Series	The Shield	Nominated	
2006	NAACP Image Award	Outstanding Actress in a Drama Series	The Shield	Nominated	
2007	NAACP Image Award	Outstanding Actress in a Drama Series	The Shield	Nominated	
2008	NAACP Image Award	Outstanding Actress in a Drama Series	The Shield	Nominated	
2009	NAACP Image Award	Outstanding Actress in a Drama Series	The Shield	Nominated	
2009	Primetime Emmy Award	Outstanding Guest Actress in a Drama Series	The No. 1 Ladies' Detective Agency	Nominated	
2010	NAACP Image Award	Outstanding Actress in a Comedy Series	Brothers	Nominated	
2010	Audie Awards	Audiobook of the Year	Nelson Mandela's Favorite African Folktales	Won	
2010	Audie Awards	Multi-Voiced Performance	Nelson Mandela's Favorite African Folktales	Won	
2017	NAACP Image Award	Outstanding Supporting Actress in a Drama Series	NCIS: New Orleans	Nominated	
2019	NAACP Image Award	Outstanding Supporting Actress in a Drama Series	NCIS: New Orleans	Nominated	
