= Minnie Gentry =

American actress (1915–1993)

- Born: Minnie Lee Watson; December 2, 1915; Norfolk, Virginia, U.S.
- Died: May 11, 1993 (aged 77); New York City, U.S.
- Spouse: Lloyd Gentry (1932–?)
- Children: 1
- Relatives: Terrence Howard (great-grandson)

Minnie Gentry (born Minnie Lee Watson, December 2, 1915 – May 11, 1993) was an American actress.

Gentry was born Minnie Lee Watson in Norfolk, Virginia, the daughter of Mincie and Taylor Watson. Her family moved to Cleveland during her childhood, where she began studying piano at the age of nine, at the Phyllis Wheatley School of Music. She began acting at the Friendly Inn Settlement and married Lloyd Gentry in 1932. Subsequently, she appeared in many plays at the African-American theater the Karamu House.

On Broadway, Gentry performed in All God's Chillun Got Wings (1975), The Sunshine Boys (1972), Ain't Supposed to Die a Natural Death (1971), and Lysistrata (1946). She also appeared in several films, including The Brother from Another Planet, Def by Temptation, and Jungle Fever. She portrayed Aunt Bess on the television series All My Children and Miriam George on Ryan's Hope. She also appeared as Gramtee on The Cosby Show.

Gentry had a daughter, Marjorie Hawkins. Her great-grandson is actor Terrence Howard.

On May 11, 1993, Gentry died at her home in Manhattan at age 77.

== Filmography ==
Year	Title	Role	Notes
1972	Georgia, Georgia	Mrs. Alberta Anderson	
1972	Come Back, Charleston Blue	Her Majesty	
1973	Black Caesar	Momma Gibbs	
1974	Claudine	Bus Woman	Uncredited
1977	Greased Lightning	Wendell's Mother	
1984	The Brother from Another Planet	Mrs. Brown	
1986	America	Mrs. Justice	
1988	Apprentice to Murder	Mam Isobel	
1990	The Cosby Show	Harriet "Gramtee" McCutcheon	Episode: "The Storyteller" (season 6)
1990	Def by Temptation	Grandma	
1992	Bad Lieutenant	Elderly Woman	
