= Mark Pacini =

American video game designer

- Born: Scranton, Pennsylvania, U.S.
- Occupation: Video game designer
- Notable work: Metroid Prime series; Batman: Arkham Origins Blackgate; ReCore

Mark Pacini is an American video game designer. He is a graduate of the Rochester Institute of Technology, and worked for Armature Studio in September 2008 until 2026. He previously worked for Retro Studios as game director of the critically acclaimed Metroid Prime series.

== Ludography ==
- NHL Breakaway 99 (1998) – project manager
- Turok: Rage Wars (1999) – project manager
- Metroid Prime (2002) – director
- Metroid Prime 2: Echoes (2004) – director
- Metroid Prime 3: Corruption (2007) – director
- Metroid Prime: Trilogy (2009) – special thanks
- Metal Gear Solid HD Collection (2012)
- PlayStation All-Stars Battle Royale (2012) – special thanks
- Batman: Arkham Origins Blackgate (2013) – director
- ReCore (2016) – director
- Resident Evil 4 VR (2021) – director

== Past ==
- Retro Studios (game director), January 2000 – April 2008
- Armature Studio (lead designer), September 2008 – January 2026
