= James Bond III =

American documentary filmmaker

- Born: 1964 (age 61–62); New York City, US
- Occupations: Actor; filmmaker
- Years active: 1977–1990

James Bond III (born December 31, 1966) is an actor and filmmaker known for writing, directing, producing and starring in the 1990 horror film Def by Temptation, as well as starring in the television films The Sky Is Gray (1980), Booker (1984), and Go Tell It on the Mountain (1985).

== Early life and career ==
Bond was born in Harlem, New York, in 1966. After he portrayed a pimp in a school play at age 8, his parents found a talent agent for him, which led to him earning a role as Doc, one of the pre-teen protagonists in the NBC television series The Red Hand Gang.

== Partial filmography ==
=== Television ===
Year	Title	Role	Notes	Ref(s)
1977	The Love Boat	Theodore Dennison Jr.	Episode: "Lost and Found/The Understudy/Married Singles"	
1977	The Red Hand Gang	Doc	12 episodes	
1978–1980	The Waltons	Josh Foster	2 episodes	
1979	Wonder Woman	T. Burton Phipps III	Episode: "The Man Who Could Not Die"	
1980	Vegas	Joey	Episode: "The Hunter Hunted"	
1980	The Sky Is Gray	James	Television film	
1981	B. J. and the Bear	Louis	Episode: "Beauties and the Beasts"	
1981	ABC Afterschool Special	Joel Garth	Episode: "The Color of Friendship"	
1985	Go Tell It on the Mountain	John	Television film	

=== Film ===
Year	Title	Role	Notes	Ref(s)
1979	The Fish That Saved Pittsburgh	Tyrone Millman		
1988	School Daze	Da Fella Monroe		
1990	Def by Temptation	Joel Garth	Also writer, director, and producer	
