= Armature Studio =

American video game developer

Armature Studio, LLC
- Type: Subsidiary
- Industry: Video games
- Founded: September 2008; 18 years ago
- Founder: Mark Pacini; Todd Keller; Jack Mathews
- Defunct: January 13, 2026
- Fate: Dissolved
- Headquarters: Austin, Texas, US
- Key people: Gregory John (vice-president and general manager); Mark Pacini (game director); Todd Keller (art director)
- Number of employees: 50
- Parent: Meta Platforms (2022–2026)
- Website: armature.com

Armature Studio, LLC was an American video game developer based in Austin, Texas. Founded in September 2008 by former Retro Studios directors Mark Pacini, Todd Keller and Jack Mathews, the studio was known for developing Batman: Arkham Origins Blackgate (2013) and ReCore (2016). Armature was acquired by Meta Platforms in 2022. It was shut down by Meta in January 2026.

== History ==
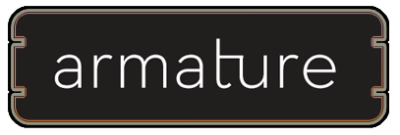
Previous logo

After completing Metroid Prime 3: Corruption in 2007, game director Mark Pacini, art director Todd Keller, and principal technology engineer Jack Mathews left Nintendo subsidiary Retro Studios in April 2008, and founded Armature that September. Armature's first work was porting Metal Gear Solid HD Collection to the PlayStation Vita in 2012. In April 2013, Warner Bros. Interactive Entertainment announced that Batman: Arkham Origins Blackgate would be developed by Armature as their first new work and released for both the PlayStation Vita and the Nintendo 3DS on October 25, 2013. Armature's third work was the PlayStation Vita port of Injustice: Gods Among Us.

The studio was set to handle porting Bloodstained: Ritual of the Night to the PlayStation Vita and Wii U. This included porting Unreal Engine 4 to both platforms, as they were not officially supported by the engine's developer, Epic Games. Armature would have then made their engine code available to licensed PS Vita and Wii U developers after Bloodstained finished. However, the game would be cancelled on both platforms for various reasons as its development extended to 2019.

In October 2015, Armature announced its first original intellectual property, Dead Star, a space-themed multiplayer online multidirectional shooter. It was released on April 5, 2016, for Microsoft Windows and PlayStation 4, but online functionality was disabled on November 1, 2016, and the game is no longer available for purchase.

Armature then went on to work with Epic Games in providing development support for Fortnite, and made three games for virtual reality headsets, with Fail Factory for the Gear VR, Sports Scramble for the Oculus Quest, and Resident Evil 4 VR for the Oculus Quest 2.

In October 2022, Armature was acquired by Meta Platforms. In January 2026, the studio was shut down by Meta as a result of layoffs at Reality Labs, with sibling studios Sanzaru Games and Twisted Pixel Games also shuttered.

== Games developed ==
Year	Title	Platform(s)	Notes
2012	Metal Gear Solid HD Collection	PlayStation Vita	Port
2013	Batman: Arkham Origins Blackgate	Microsoft Windows, Nintendo 3DS, PlayStation 3, Wii U, PlayStation Vita, Xbox 360	Developed by Armature
2013	Injustice: Gods Among Us	PlayStation Vita	Port
2014	The Unfinished Swan	PlayStation 4, PlayStation Vita	Port
2015	Borderlands: The Handsome Collection	PlayStation 4, Xbox One	Port
2016	ReCore	Windows, Xbox One	Original IP created and co-developed by Armature with Microsoft and Comcept
2016	Dead Star	Windows, PlayStation 4	Original IP
2017	Fail Factory!	Meta Quest 2, Oculus Rift	Original virtual reality IP
2017	Fortnite	Xbox One, PlayStation 4, MacOS, PC	Development partner for features and UI
2019	Duck Game	Nintendo Switch	Port
2019	Sports Scramble	Meta Quest 2, Oculus Rift	Original virtual reality IP
2020	Bayonetta & Vanquish 10th Anniversary	PlayStation 4, Xbox One	Port
2020	Ark: Genesis Part 1	PlayStation 4, PlayStation 5	Live game and DLC
2021	Where the Heart Leads	PlayStation 4	Original IP
2021	Resident Evil 4	Meta Quest 2	Port
